= Michelangelo Ricci =

Italian mathematician and Roman Catholic Cardinal (1619–1682)

His Eminence Michelangelo Ricci
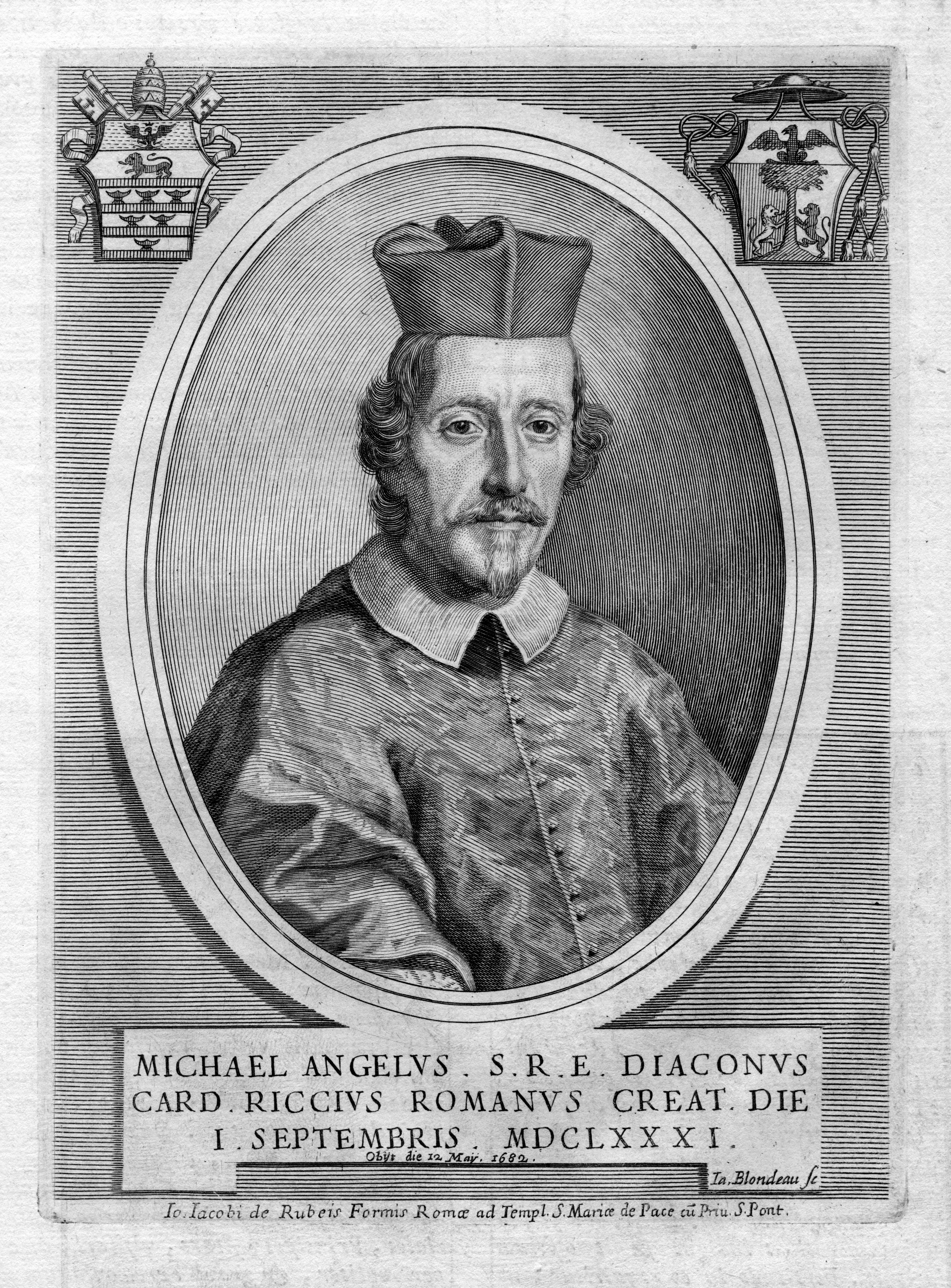
- Michelangelo Ricci
- Diocese: Diocese of Rome
- Appointed: 1 September 1681
- Term ended: 12 May 1682

Orders
- Created cardinal: 1 September 1681 by Pope Innocent XI
- Rank: Cardinal-Deacon

Personal details
- Born: 30 January 1619 Rome, Papal States
- Died: 12 May 1682 (aged 63) Rome
- Denomination: Roman Catholic

Michelangelo Ricci (30 January 1619 – 12 May 1682) was an Italian mathematician and a Cardinal of the Roman Catholic Church.

== Biography ==
Michelangelo Ricci was born on 30 January 1619 in Rome, then capital of the Papal States, to a family of low social standing that originated in Bergamo.

He studied theology and law in Rome, where he was a contemporary of René-François de Sluse. He also studied mathematics under Benedetto Castelli who himself had been a student of Galileo Galilei. He was a friend of Evangelista Torricelli, kept close links with contemporary scientific culture, and played an important role in the development of the Galilean school.

Like de Sluze, he spent his entire career in the Roman Catholic Church and served the pope in various roles on several occasions. A trained theologian, he acted as consultant to various Congregations of the Roman Curia. Having suffered from epilepsy since his birth, he was (according to canon law of the time) disqualified from ordination. Nonetheless, he was created a Cardinal-Deacon in the Consistory of 1 September 1681 by Pope Innocent XI, with the title 'Cardinal-Deacon of Santa Maria in Aquiro'. His position in the church was very useful for protecting his friends and fellow scientists in their controversies with the opposing scholastic school.

He played a significant part in the theoretical debates and experiments that led up to Torricelli's discovery of atmospheric pressure and invention of the mercury barometer. In particular he followed the experiments in this field by Gasparo Berti, in Rome.

There is an unpublished manuscript by Ricci, devoted to algebra, in the library of the Mathematical Institute of Genoa. It shows that by 1640 he was familiar with the 'New Algebra' of François Viète. In this book he provides a critique of the solutions given by the geometer Marino Ghetaldi of Ragusa in his De Resolutione et Compositione Matematica to the problems posed by Apollonius of Perga.

His published mathematical work is summarised in a treatise of nineteen pages, Exercitatio geometrica, de maximis et minimis (1666) in which he studies the maxima of functions of the form $x^m(a - x)^n$ and tangents to curves with equation $y^m = kx^n$, using methods that are an early form of induction. This treatise was much admired by his contemporaries and was republished as an appendix to Mercator's 'Logarithmo-Technia' (1688). He also studied spirals (1644) and cycloids (1674) and recognised that the study of tangents and the calculation of areas are reciprocal operations.

Ricci is also known for his correspondence with Torricelli, Vincenzo Viviani, René de Sluze and Cardinal Leopoldo de' Medici, founder of the Accademia del Cimento. These letters give his thoughts on paraboloids and hyperboloids when cut by parallel planes, on the surface of a ring, and on the properties of the vacuum. It was Ricci who welcomed Marin Mersenne, when he came to Italy to present the work of René Descartes. In optics he studied the magnifying effect of lenses. With Giovanni Battista Baliani he discussed the Galilean revolution. Ricci was also a close associate of Antonio Nardi, another mathematician in Rome. He collaborated with Nardi on his Scene, an unpublished manuscript that circulated among Torricelli and others, in which Ricci included some of the material that would later appear in his 1666 Geometrica Exercitatio.

Following the death of Torricelli and the disappearance of Bonaventura Cavalieri, he was requested to collate and publish his correspondence with these two men. However he declined the invitation, leading to Torricelli's work being forgotten for some time.

He endeavoured to defend Francesco Redi against Cardinal Leopold when Redi published his Esperienze Intorno alla Generazione degl'Insetti, arguing against the spontaneous generation of insects.

Ricci was also the backer of Abbot Francesco Nazzari in the publication of the first review of Italian literature, the Giornale de' Letterati (1668-1683).

He died in Rome, age 63, on 12 May 1682.

== Works ==
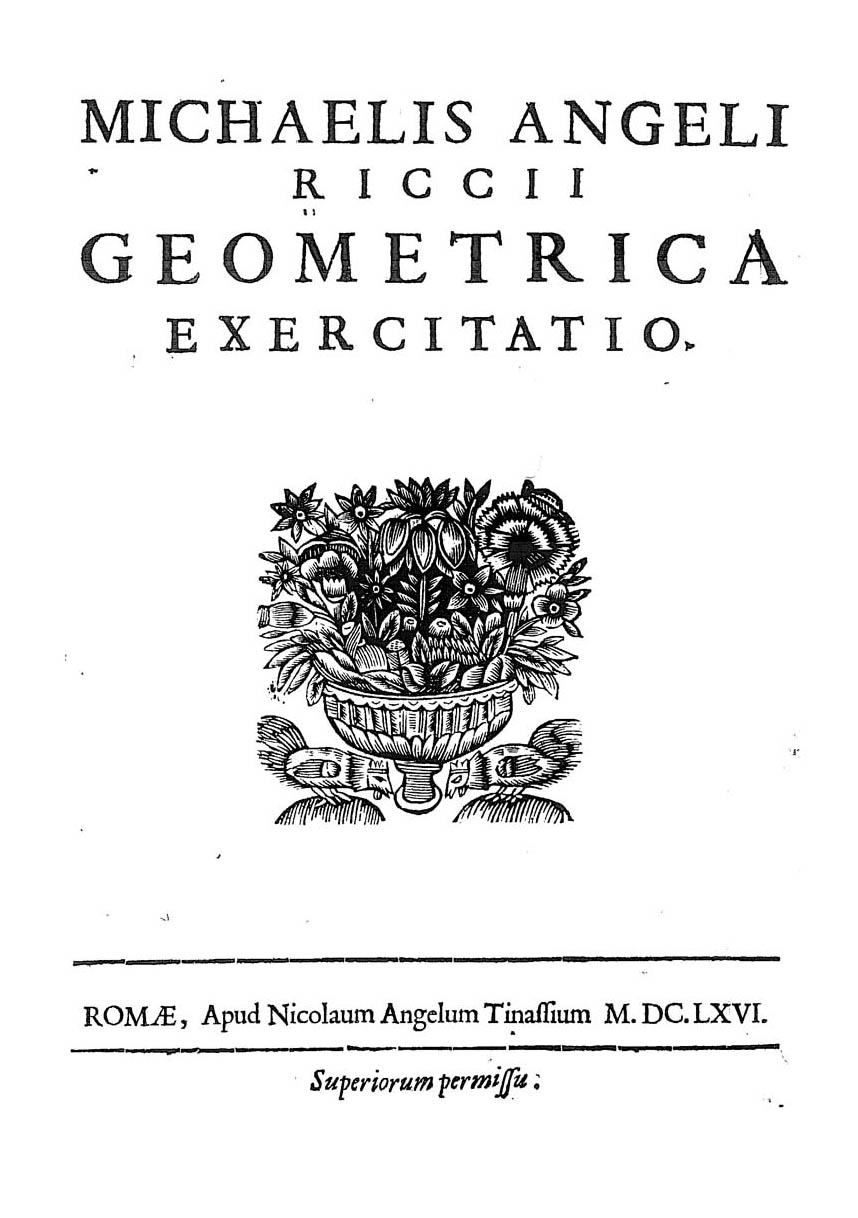
Geometrica exercitatio, 1666

- Michaelis Angeli Riccii Geometrica exercitatio, Romae: apud Nicolaum Angelum Tinassium, 1666
- Decretum sacrae Congregationis indulgentijs, sacrisque reliquijs praepositae, Romae et Pataui: typis reuerendae Camerae Apostolicae, 1678
- Decretum Aloysius card. Homodeus, Romae, et Pataui, Romae et Pataui: typis reuerendae Camerae Apostolicae, 1678
- Decretum sacrae Congregationis Indulgentiarum, Romae: typis reuerendae Camerae Apostolicae, 1679
- Logarithmotechnia Nicolaus Mercator. Beigebunden Exercitatio geometrica, Hildesheim; New York: Olms, 1975

== Sources ==
- «RICCI MICHELANGELO, Cardinale». In: Gaetano Moroni, Dizionario di erudizione storico-ecclesiastica, Vol. LVII, Venezia: Tipografia Emiliana, 1852, p. 177
- Vitarum Italorum doctrina excellentium qui saeculo XVIII floruerunt decas I-VI. Auctore Angelo Fabronio, Romae: typis S. Michaelis apud Junchium: prostant venales apud Natalem Barbiellini in foro Pasquini, 1769, Vol. II, p. 200
