= Galileo thermometer =

Thermometer containing several glass vessels of varying density

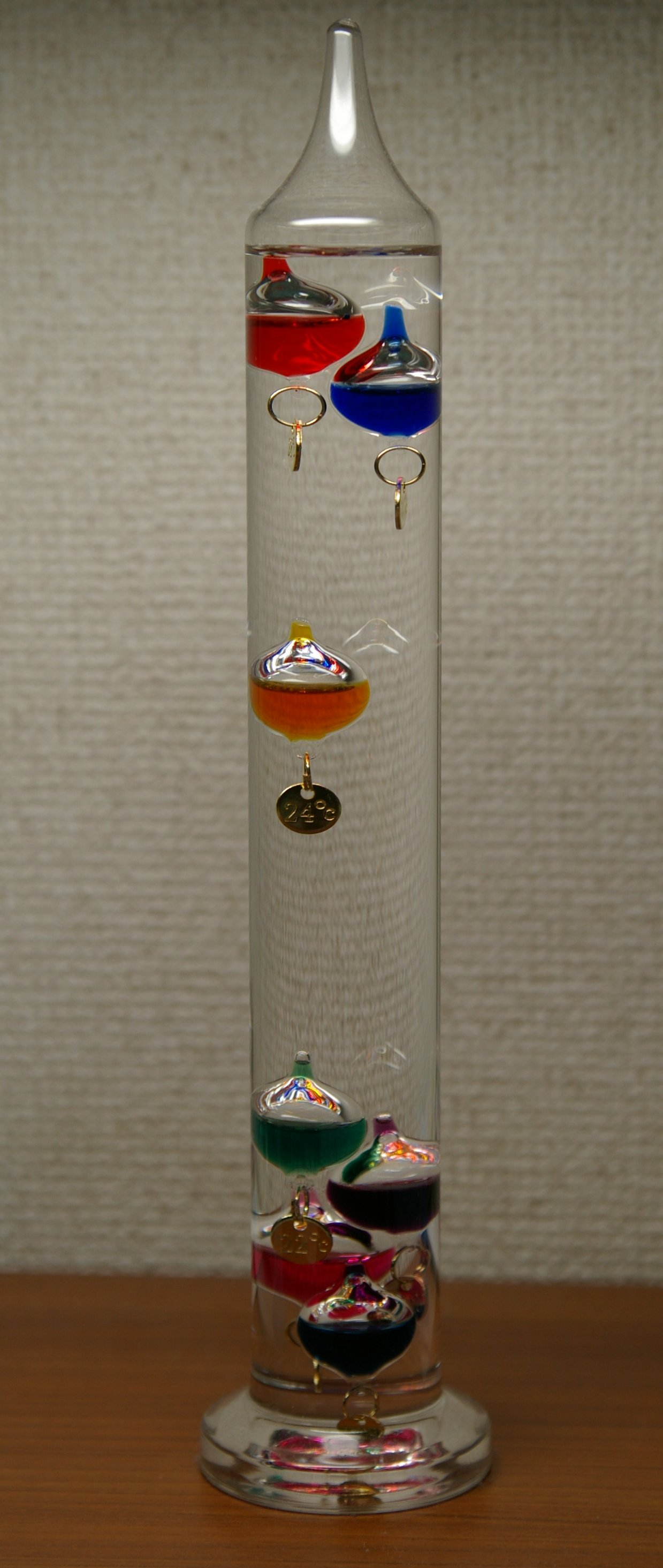
A Celsius Galilean thermometer in two degree gradations. A risen orange orb denotes 24 °C.

A Galileo thermometer (or Galilean thermometer) is a thermometer containing a clear liquid and several glass vessels of varying density. The individual floats rise or fall in relation to their respective density and the density of the surrounding liquid as the temperature changes. It is named after Galileo Galilei because he discovered the principle on which this thermometer is based—that the density of a liquid changes in relation to its temperature.

== History ==
Although named after the 16th–17th-century physicist Galileo, the thermometer was not invented by him. (Galileo did invent a thermometer called Galileo's air thermometer, more accurately called a thermoscope, in or before 1603.)

The instrument now known as a Galileo thermometer was invented by a group of academics and technicians known as the Accademia del Cimento of Florence, who included Galileo's pupil, Torricelli and Torricelli's pupil Viviani. Details of the thermometer were published in the Saggi di naturali esperienze fatte nell'Academia del Cimento sotto la protezione del Serenissimo Principe Leopoldo di Toscana e descritte dal segretario di essa Accademia (1666), the academy's main publication. The English translation of this work (1684) describes the device ('The Fifth Thermometer') as 'slow and lazy', a description that is reflected in an alternative Italian name for the invention, the termometro lento (slow thermometer). The outer vessel was filled with 'rectified spirits of wine' (a concentrated solution of ethanol in water); the weights of the glass bubbles were adjusted by grinding a small amount of glass from the sealed end; and a small air space was left at the top of the main vessel to allow 'for the Liquor to rarefie' (i.e. expand).

The device now called the Galileo thermometer was revived in the modern era by the Natural History Museum, London, which started selling a version in the 1990s.

== Operation ==
In the Galileo thermometer, the small glass bulbs are partly filled with different-colored liquids. The composition of these liquids is mainly water; some contain a tiny percent of alcohol, but that is not important for the functioning of the thermometer; they merely function as fixed weights, with their colors denoting given temperatures. Once the hand-blown bulbs have been sealed, their effective densities are adjusted using the metal tags hanging from beneath them. Any expansion due to the temperature change of the colored liquid and air gap inside the bulbs does not affect the operation of the thermometer, as these materials are sealed inside a glass bulb of approximately fixed size. The clear liquid in which the bulbs are submerged is usually not water, but some organic compounds (such as ethanol or kerosene) the density of which varies with temperature. The fixed size of the outer tube ensures that the outer clear liquid will be in gas-liquid equilibrium. Even so, the equilibrium density of liquids like ethanol decreases with an increase in temperature and this causes the bulbs to rise or sink accordingly.

As the temperature rises the bulbs will sink one by one according to their individual density as the clear holding fluid's density gradually changes around them. Eventually all the bulbs may be at the base of the tube depending on the temperature of the surroundings and therefore that of the clear holding fluid. As the temperature falls the reverse happens with the bulbs, until they can all be at the top.

The metal tags on each bulb are stamped with a temperature. If a bulb is in the centre of the column, that gives a close approximation of the environment temperature outside the tube. If there are some at the top and some at the base but none in between the average of the lowest bulb at the top and the highest at the base provides that figure.

== Gallery ==
Figure 1

Figure 2

Figure 3

== See also ==
- Cartesian diver – Classic science experiment demonstrating the Archimedes' principle and the ideal gas law
- Frog thermometer – Type of clinical thermometer
