= Giornale de' Letterati =

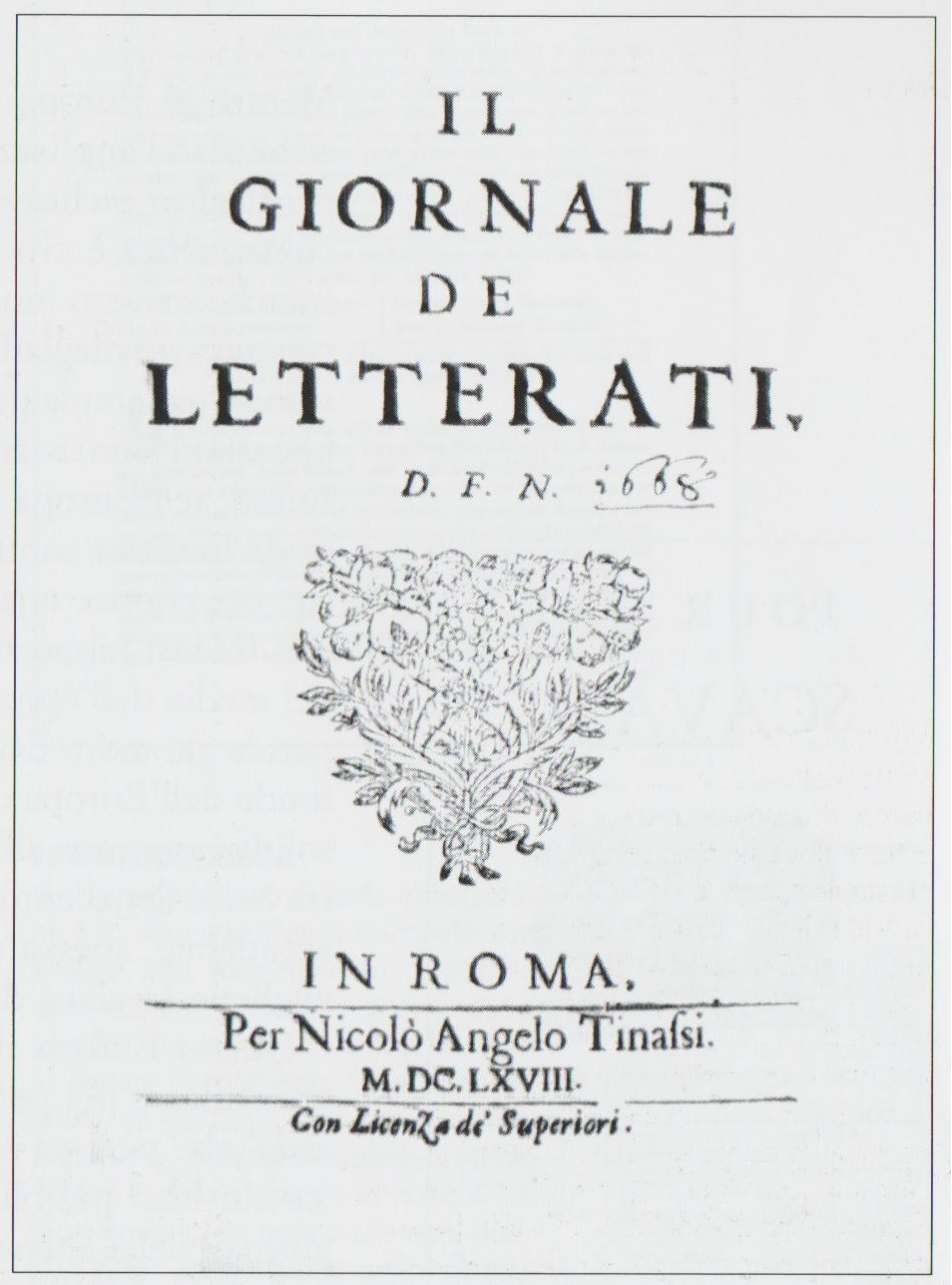
- Discipline: Literature; Science; Philology
- Language: Italian

Publication details
- History: 1668–1679
- Frequency: Weekly

Standard abbreviations
- ISO 4: G. Lett.

The Giornale de' Letterati (lit. 'Journal of the Learned'), established by Michelangelo Ricci, is the earliest academic journal published in Italy. It was among the most famous learned journals in continental Europe, together with the Journal des sçavans (1665–), the Acta Eruditorum (1682–1782) and Pierre Bayle’s Amsterdam publication Nouvelles de la république des lettres (1684–1718).

== History ==
The Giornale de' Letterati was first published in 1668. Its founder and first editor, Michelangelo Ricci, was in an ideal position to obtain contributions and advice from the likes of Evangelista Torricelli and Vincenzo Viviani, whom he knew through his former teacher, Galileian mathematician Benedetto Castelli. As the author of a mathematical treatise that earned a reprint by the Royal Society of London, he could competently judge the scientific material that came in. The Roman Giornale's next editor, Francesco Nazzari, was an expert in natural philosophy, which he taught at the Sapienza University of Rome; and his directorship of the polyglot press of the Congregation de propaganda fide familiarized him with the workings of the publishing industry. The journal's third and final editor, Giovanni Ciampini, author, patron and antiquary, enjoyed a far more prestigious circle of acquaintances than any of his co-editors, as the founding member of the academy of ecclesiastical history in the same Congregation. Under the guidance of these editors, the Roman journal attracted contributions from as far afield as Robert Hooke in England, and it combined them with book reviews, bibliographical news, and obituaries. And for a time, it seemed likely to rival the Paris Journal des sçavans, whose format it closely imitated.

== Bibliography ==
- Tiraboschi, Girolamo (1833). "Cominciamento de' giornali letterarii". Storia della letteratura italiana. Vol. IV. Milan: Bettoni. pp. 540–2.
- Gardair, Jean-Michel (1984). Le "Giornale de' letterati de Rome": 1668-1681 (in French). Leo S. Olschki. ISBN 9788822232441.
- Giornale dei letterati entry (in Italian) in the Enciclopedia Treccani
- Dooley, Brendan Maurice (1991). Science, Politics, and Society in Eighteenth-Century Italy. The Giornale De' Letterati D'Italia and Its World. Garland Publishing. ISBN 9780815304715.
- Favino, Federica (2008). "Beyond the moderns? the Accademia fisico-matematica of Rome, 1677-1698 and the vacuum". History of Universities. XXIII (2): 120–158. doi:10.1093/oso/9780199550326.003.0006. ISBN 978-0-19-955032-6.
