= Erbauliche Monaths-Unterredungen =

German magazine

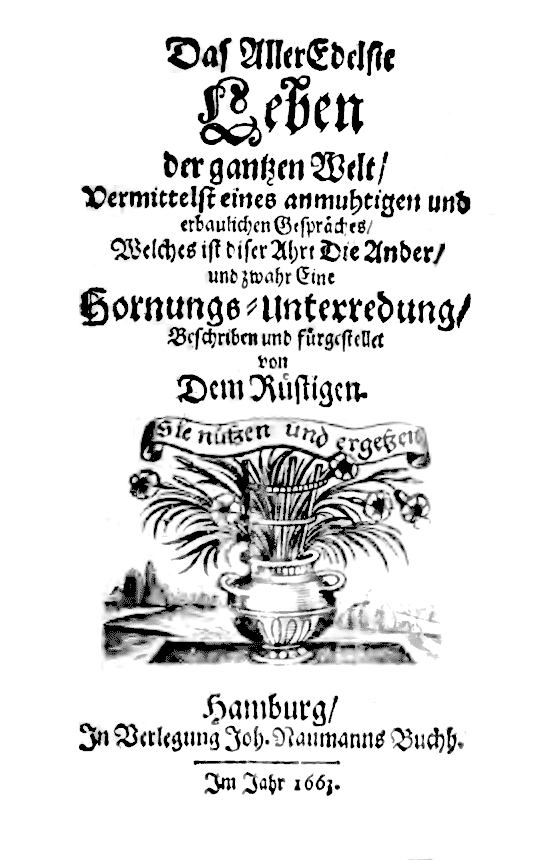
- Cover of Erbauliche Monaths-Unterredungen, February 1663 Edition
- Staff writers: Johann Rist (1663–1667) Erasmus Finx (1667–1668)
- Categories: Religion, Philosophy, Literary
- Frequency: Monthly
- Publisher: Johann Georg Schiele's Bookshop or Neumann
- First issue: 1663; 363 years ago
- Final issue: 1668
- Country: Holy Roman Empire
- Language: German

Erbauliche Monaths-Unterredungen ("Edifying Monthly Discussions") was a magazine based in the Holy Roman Empire, now Germany. Issued from 1663 to 1668, it was published monthly. The publication was initially authored by Johann Rist, a theologian and poet from Hamburg.

== The printing press and magazines ==
The magazine's inception was spurred by the advancement of the printing press in fifteenth-century Germany. This allowed for printed single-page leaflets to evolve into multipage pamphlets, bridging the gap between newspapers and books.

== Contents ==
In its initial iteration, the literary magazine, although labeled as a periodical philosophy publication, exclusively showcased the works of Rist, which was predominantly poetry and hymns.

Each issue, dedicated to a specific month, reflected the author's beliefs. Despite being planned as a monthly release, it only came out when Rist had time to write and print it. Additionally, the name on the front page didn't always match the topics of the month, unlike a typical journal.

For the topic of discussion, January focused on ink, February on country life, March on the philosopher's stone, April on painting, May on reading culture, and June on contemplating death. These discussions on various topics were tailored to reflect Rist's views and tastes.

=== Continuation after Rist's death ===
Rist managed to put out six issues until his death occurred on 31 August 1667. Erasmus Finx, a German polymath, assumed control of Rist's magazine. Finx took on the responsibility for the magazine's continuation, overseeing it for the six months from the latter half of 1667 until ceasing publication in 1668.

== Inspiration and analysis ==
It inspired the creation of other similar magazines and led to an enthusiasm for education among its primarily intellectual audience. Rist's magazine encouraged many others to start making literary journals around Europe. Notable examples include the French writer Denis de Sallo, who started the Journal des sçavans in 1665, and the Italian writer Francesco Nazzari, creator of Giornale de' Letterati in 1668.

=== Modern magazines ===
According to author John Morrish, Rist's periodical is the first magazine according to modern standards. The Encyclopaedia Britannica also agrees it is one of the earliest publications to resemble a modern magazine.

Tony Quinn, a magazine historian, argues a work titled "Gynasceum, sive Theatrum Mulierum" published in 1588, by Josse Amman, is the first magazine. It showcases the various female costumes of Europe at the time, making it one of the first fashion magazines.

== Editions ==
=== Schiele's bookshop ===
Johann Georg Schiele (1634–1689) was a publisher in Frankfurt am Main. He published several works by Johann Rist, including Rist's Monthly Conversations.

=== Pseudonym ===
Johnann Rist authored his editions with the name "Der Rüstige" which translates to "The Vigorous".

=== Post-1668 reprints ===
The Most Noble Foolishness of the Whole World was re-published in 1669 in Frankfurt by Schiele's Bookshop. The Most Noble Wetness of the Entire World was reprinted in January 1671 and then in 1674 by Schiele's Bookshop in Frankfurt, authored by Johann Rist.

In 1786, 1790, and 1795, Michael Dillmeyer located in Germantown, Pennsylvania, utilized the magazine's various song to be used in United Evangelical Lutheran Congregations in Pennsylvania and the neighboring states.

Some editions of the magazine have been digitized and made available on the internet, while others can be found in German archives in their original form. Additionally, some organizations offer modern reproductions of these editions.

Name	Author	Date	Location	Publisher	Citation
The Most Noble Life of the Whole World	Johann Rist	February 1663	Hamburg	Neumann / Schiele's Bookshop	
The Most Noble Foolishness of the Whole World	Johann Rist	March 1664	Hamburg	Neumann	
The Most Noble Amusement for Art and Virtue-Loving Minds	Johann Rist	April 1666	Frankfurt	Johann Georg Schiele's Bookshop	
The Most Noble Invention of the Whole World	Johann Rist	May 1667	Frankfurt	Johann Georg Schiele's Bookshop	
The Most Noble Shortening of Time for the Whole World	Johann Rist	Fall of 1668	Frankfurt	Johann Georg Schiele's Bookshop	
