= Antonio Nardi =

Italian man of letters (1598-1648?)

- Born: 1598; Arezzo
- Died: c. 1648
- Occupations: Mathematician and Man of letters

Antonio Nardi (1598 – c. 1648) was a Tuscan man of letters known for his geometrical work with Galileo Galilei and his disciples, Michelangelo Ricci and Evangelista Torricelli. He is also the author of the Scene (sometimes referred to as the Scene Toscane or Accademiche), a sprawling manuscript work that covers philosophy, physics, ethics, and literature in addition to mathematics.

== Biography ==
=== The early years ===
Very little is known of Nardi's early life. Indeed, until recently his date and place of baptism (November 8, 1598 at Santa Maria della Pieve in Arezzo) were uncertain. His parents, Lazzaro Nardi and Caterina Tondinelli, were of minor provincial nobility originating from Florence. Nardi received his degree in utroque iure at the University of Pisa in 1621. It was there that he likely came into contact with Galileans like Benedetto Castelli, who held a chair in mathematics at Pisa and was a longtime friend and supporter of Galileo.

=== The Rome years ===
In the 1630s, Nardi became active in a group of Castelli's students in Rome that included Evangelista Torricelli, Michelangelo Ricci, and Raffaello Magiotti. Nardi, along with Torricelli and Magiotti, wrote a number of letters to Galileo praising his Dialogue Concerning the Two Chief World Systems and faulting its detractors after its publication in 1632. Galileo, recognizing their devotion, referred to the three as his "triumvirate" in Rome. In 1635, Nardi's uncle, Baldassarre Nardi secured him a position in the court of Cardinal Giovanni Francesco Guidi di Bagno in Rome, which was home to many intellectuals like the Cardinal's librarian, Gabriel Naudé. Nardi served there until the Cardinal's death in 1641. Around this time, Nardi renewed his correspondence with Galileo, sending him this time samples of his own geometrical work. These were from Nardi's Ricercate Geometriche sopra Archimede, which is made up of newer, more efficient proofs of Archimedes' original theorems using the new method of indivisibles developed by Bonaventura Cavalieri. Galileo's responses are not extant, but Nardi's subsequent letters indicate that Galileo approved of his work and that Nardi was even considering publishing it. This plan appears, however, to have fallen through when Galileo died in 1642 shortly after the death of Nardi's other patron, Cardinal di Bagno.

=== From 1642 to Nardi's death ===
From 1642 onwards, there is little information on Nardi's activities. Although none of his own letters survive, the correspondence of Torricelli, Ricci, and Marin Mersenne mentions Nardi frequently. During this time, he began composing his Scene, of which the most complete and polished version is preserved as Gal. Ms. 130 in the Biblioteca Nazionale Centrale in Florence. Ricci was working on having the manuscript published, as he contributed to the Scene with some of his own mathematical work, but this never came to fruition. Nothing is known of when and where Nardi died. After the deaths of Bonaventura Cavalieri and Torricelli in a typhus outbreak in 1647, there is no trace of him in the Galileans' correspondence. It is likely that he too was killed by typhus.

== Scene ==
Almost 1,400-pages long, Gal. Ms. 130 represents the culmination of Nardi's work, combining his geometrical material with subject matter from almost every field of learning from theology to philology. Written in polished, literary Tuscan (i.e. in the Tuscan language), all the material displays a high level of sophistication, although Nardi himself concedes that he has not made a decisive contribution to any one field. What is strange about the work, however, is that it seems to lack any kind of organization, jumping indifferently between ruminating on Aristotelian philosophy and commenting on Montaigne's Essays. The manuscript, despite the clear hand in which is written, has the aura of a rough draft of Nardi setting down his thoughts as they came to him, but other iterations of the manuscript indicate that Nardi preserved its disorder as the Scene developed. Indeed, in a table of contents that appears in the middle of the work, Nardi jokes about this apparent "philosophical chaos":

"how confused are these Academic scenes? It would seem to be the idea of confusion itself if confusion were to have an idea. But if they were ordered, it would not be formed by confusion. For myself, I think that they are a philosophical chaos, which could be easily ordered if only the mind survives it. Certainly I have placed them in their place where they seem to me not entirely without order."

The Scene has never been published, and that is arguably why Nardi became the obscure figure he is today. This was not the case in his own time. Torricelli, Magiotti, and Mersenne all saw some part of Nardi's work and regarded it highly. Indeed, Ricci collaborated closely with Nardi on the Scene, contributing some of his own geometrical material that he would later publish in his 1666 Geometrica Exercitatio. Even after Nardi's death, his relative and the Medici court physician, Francesco Redi, inherited Nardi's papers and produced another manuscript iteration of the Scene that included an anatomical treatise by one of his followers, Giuseppe Zambeccari.
