= Parabola (disambiguation) =

A parabola is a mathematical curve.

Parabola or Parabole may also refer to:

== Arches ==
- Parabolic arch

== Music ==
- Parabola (album), an album by Gil Evans
- "Parabola" (song), a song by Tool
- "Parabola", a song by Jawbreaker from Bivouac

== Other uses ==
- Parabola (magazine), a magazine published by The Society for the Study of Myth and Tradition
- Parabola (moth), a genus of moth
- Parabola (operating system), a GNU/Linux-libre distribution
- Parabola Allegory, a Rosicrucian allegory attributed to Hinricus Madathanus

== See also ==
- Parable
- Parabola of safety
