= Benedetto Castelli =

Italian mathematician (1578–1643)

Dom Benedetto Castelli O.S.B.
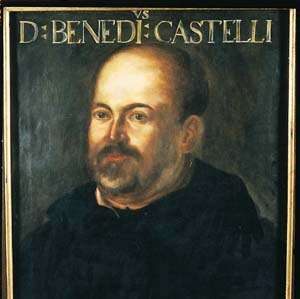
- Born: 1578; Brescia, Republic of Venice
- Died: 9 April 1643 (aged 64–65); Rome, Papal States
- Education: University of Padua
- Title: abbot
- Scientific career
- Fields: Mathematician
- Workplaces: University of Pisa
- Academic advisors: Galileo Galilei
- Notable students: Giovanni Alfonso Borelli; Evangelista Torricelli; Bonaventura Cavalieri; Antonio Nardi; Raffaello Magiotti

Benedetto Castelli O.S.B. (1578 – 9 April 1643), born Antonio Castelli, was an Italian mathematician. Benedetto was his religious name that he adopted when he entered the Benedictine Order in 1595.

== Life ==
Born in Brescia, Castelli studied at the University of Padua and later became an abbot at the Benedictine monastery in Monte Cassino.

He was a long-time friend and supporter of his teacher, Galileo Galilei, and in turn, he was a teacher to Galileo's son. He assisted Galileo's study of sunspots and participated in the examination of the theories of Nicolaus Copernicus. Castelli was interested in mathematics and hydraulics. He was appointed as a mathematician to the University of Pisa, replacing Galileo, and later at the University of Rome La Sapienza. Castelli introduced Bonaventura Cavalieri to Galileo, leading to extensive correspondence between the latter; Galileo was instrumental in procuring a position for Cavalieri at the University of Bologna in 1629.

Castelli was involved in the discovery of the phases of Venus:

In December 1610, Galileo received a letter from Castelli, asking if the phases of Venus were observable through Galileo's new telescope. Days later, Galileo wrote in a letter to Johannes Kepler saying that he'd observed Venus going through phases, but took complete credit for himself. It is unclear, lacking copies of any earlier correspondence, whether Castelli was telling Galileo of it for the first time, or responding to Galileo having previously informed him of it.

Castelli died in Rome. His students included Giovanni Alfonso Borelli, Raffaello Magiotti, Antonio Nardi, and Evangelista Torricelli, the inventor of the barometer and an early proponent of the air pump. He recommended Gasparo Berti for a chair of mathematics at Sapienza. Berti was to be his successor at the university, but he died before he could take the post.

== Works ==
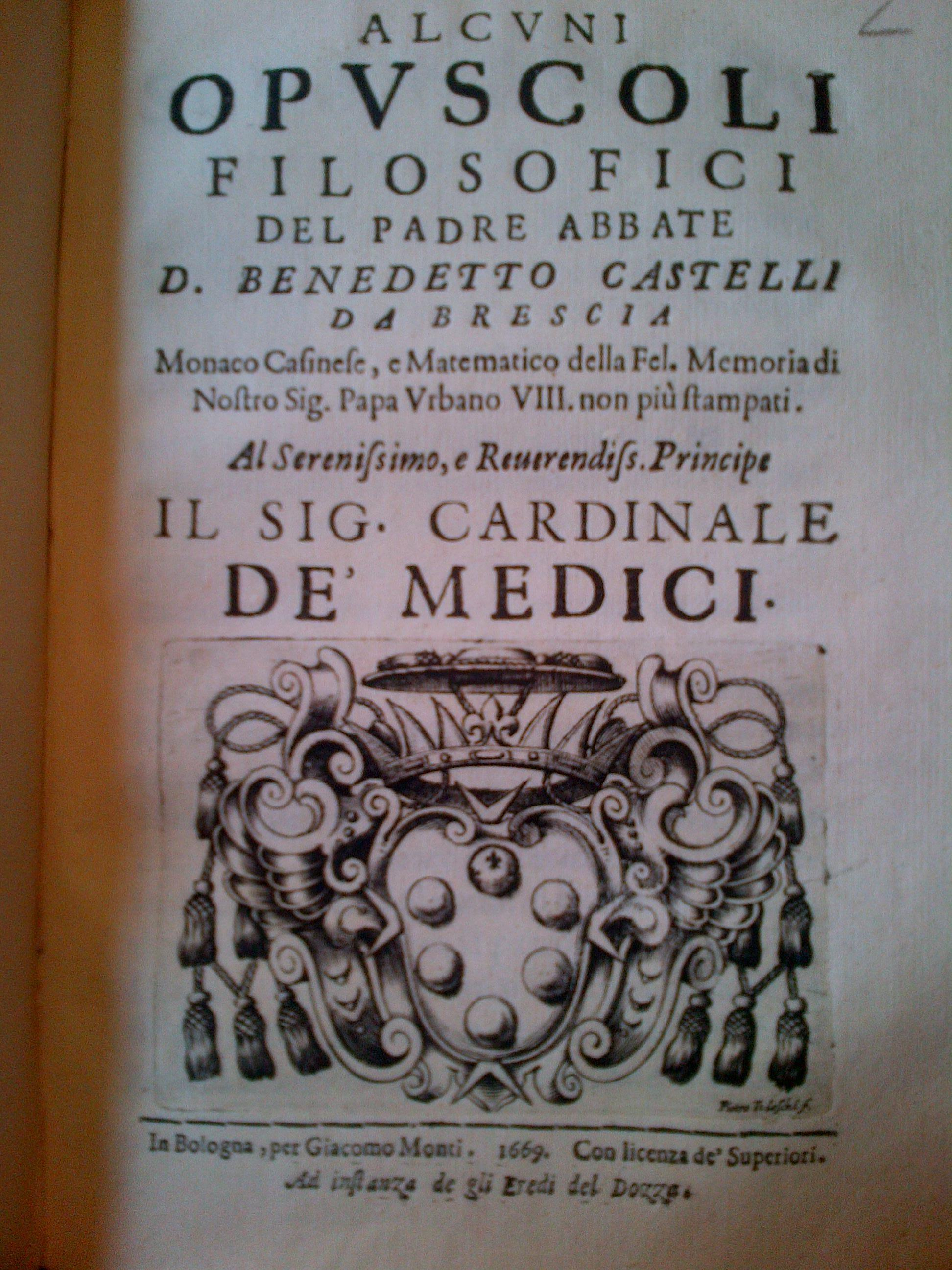
Opuscoli filosofici, Brescia, 1669

He published Mensuration of Running Water, an important work on fluids in motion, and then his Geometrical Demonstrations of the Measure of Running Waters in which the publishing notes described him as Abbot of San Benedetto Aloysio and Mathematician to Pope Urban VIII, once a supporter of his mentor, Galileo.

He dedicated both publications to "the most Illustrious, and most Excellent Prince" Taddeo Barberini, a nephew of Pope Urban VIII.

- Benedetto Castelli (1661) [1628]. Della misura delle acque correnti (in Italian). London: William Leybourn.
- Castelli, Benedetto (1669). Alcuni opuscoli filosofici . Brescia.
- Castelli, Benedetto (1639). Discorso sopra la calamita .
- Benedetto Castelli, Galileo Galilei, Archimedes, Giovanni Alfonso Borelli, Evangelista Torricelli, Vincenzo Viviani Opuscoli idraulici, Bologna, Tipografia Marsigli, 1822.
- Risposta alle opposizioni del signor Lodovico delle Colombe e del signor Vincenzio di Grazia, contro al trattato del signor Galileo Galilei, delle cose che stanno su l'acqua, o che in quella si muovono (in Italian). Firenze: Cosimo Giunta. 1615.

== See also ==
- List of Roman Catholic scientist-clerics
- Letter to Benedetto Castelli
