= Frog thermometer =

Type of clinical thermometer

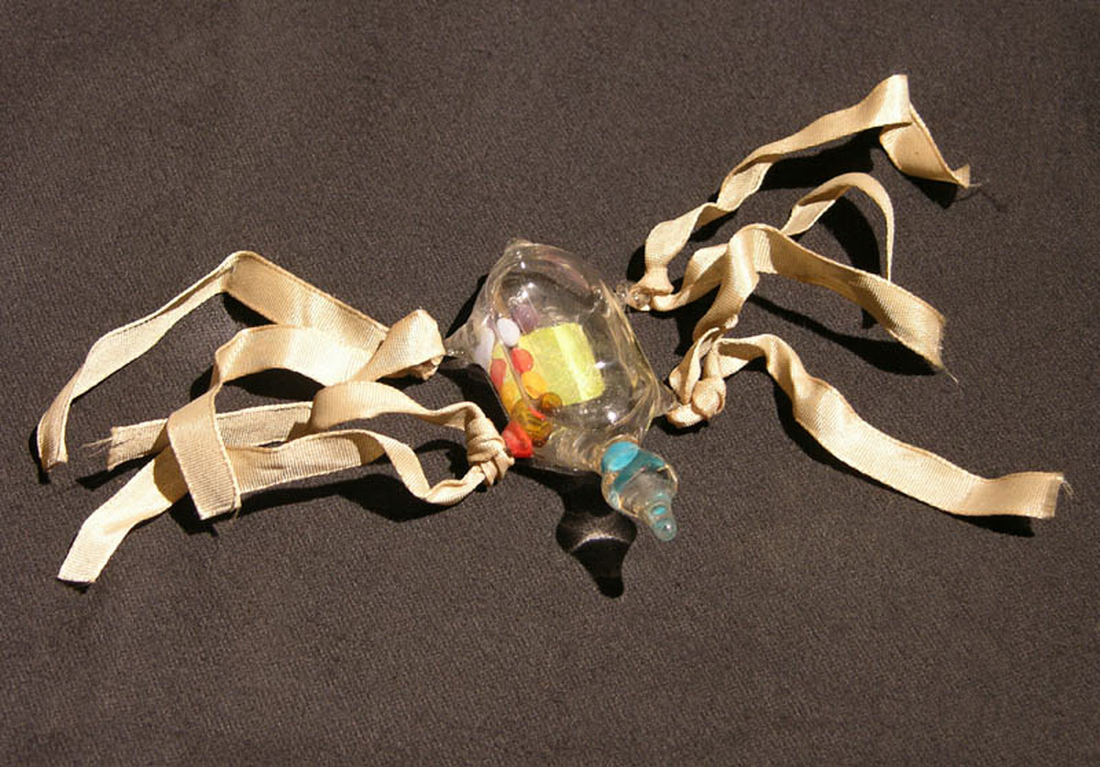
Frog thermometer

The frog thermometer or - as the Cimento academicians defined it, the botticino [small-toad] thermometer - contained small glass spheres of different density, which were immersed in alcohol. The device was used as a clinical thermometer, tied to the wrist or the arm of the patient with the head of the frog facing upward. The variations in body temperature were registered by the movement of the spheres. The rise in temperature causes an increase in the volume of the alcohol, reflected in the movement of the small spheres (first the less dense, then the more dense). Because of the spheres' sluggish motion, this thermometer was also called infingardo [slothful, slow]. The invention of this model is attributed to Ferdinand II de' Medici.

== See also ==
- Galileo thermometer – Thermometer containing several glass vessels of varying density
