= Erasmus Finx =

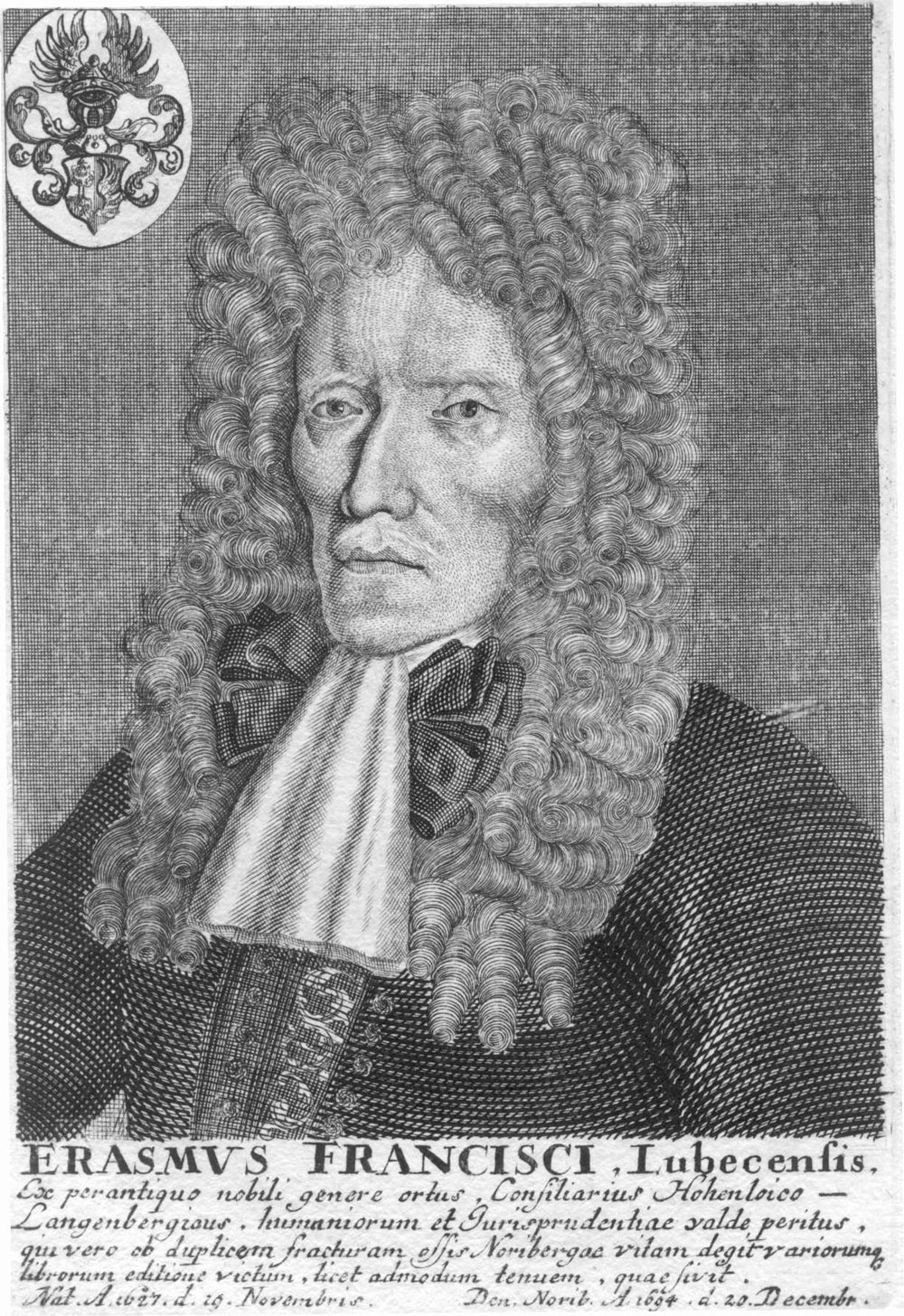
Erasmus Finx

Erasmus Finx (16 November 1627 – 20 December 1694), aka Erasmus Francisci, was a German polymath, author, and writer of Christian hymns.

== Life ==
Finx was born in Lübeck, the son of a lawyer and received higher education at Lüneburg and Stettin. He studied law and was travelling through Italy, France and the Netherlands afterwards. As of 1657, he worked as a reader at Endter publishing at Nuremberg, where he also published some of his books. He died in Nuremberg.

He wrote a large number of books under various pseudonyms (Der Erzählende, Freundlieb Ehrenreich von Kaufleben, Theophil Anti-Scepticus, Der Unpartheyische, Gottlieb Unverrucht, Theophilus Urbinus, and Gottlieb Warmund), and he edited Johann Weikhard von Valvasor's The Glory of the Duchy of Carniola.

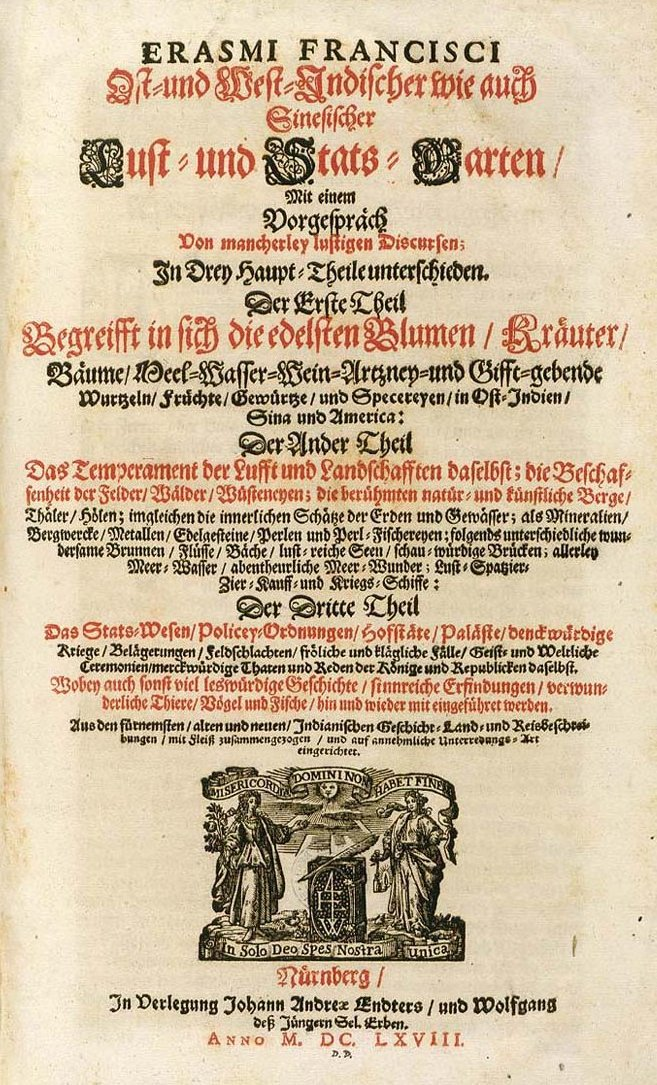
Title Ost und West Indischer wie auch Sinesischer Lust und Staats-Garten

== Works ==
- Die geistl. Goldkammer der I. bußfertigen, II. gottverlangenden u. III. jesusverliebten Seelen, deren Geschmeide u. Juwelen durch wehklagende Reuebegierden, gläubige Wünsche u. inbrünstige Seufzer den Liebhabern der Himmelsschätze zuteil werden, 1664
- Ost- und West-Indischer wie auch Sinesischer Lust- und Stats-Garten: in drey Haupt-Theile unterschieden..., Nürnberg 1668
- Erbauliche Monaths-Unterredungen (1663-1668)
- Christl. Spazierbüchlein, 1668 (Pseudonym: Christian Minsicht)
- Die lustige Schaubühne allerhand Curiositäten in einer Sprachhaltung einiger guter Freunde vorgestellet I, 1669; II, 1674
- Erinnerung der Morgenröte oder geistl. Hahnengeschrei an die im Schatten des Todes vertieften Herzen in 63 Aufmunterungen der menschl. Seele z. Buße u. wahrer Bekehrung u. z. Glauben u. gläubigen Wandel, 1672
- Deren nach der ewigen u. beständigen Ruhe trachtenden seelenlabende Ruhestunden in den unruhigen Mühen u. Tränen dieser Welt, 3 Bde., 1676-80
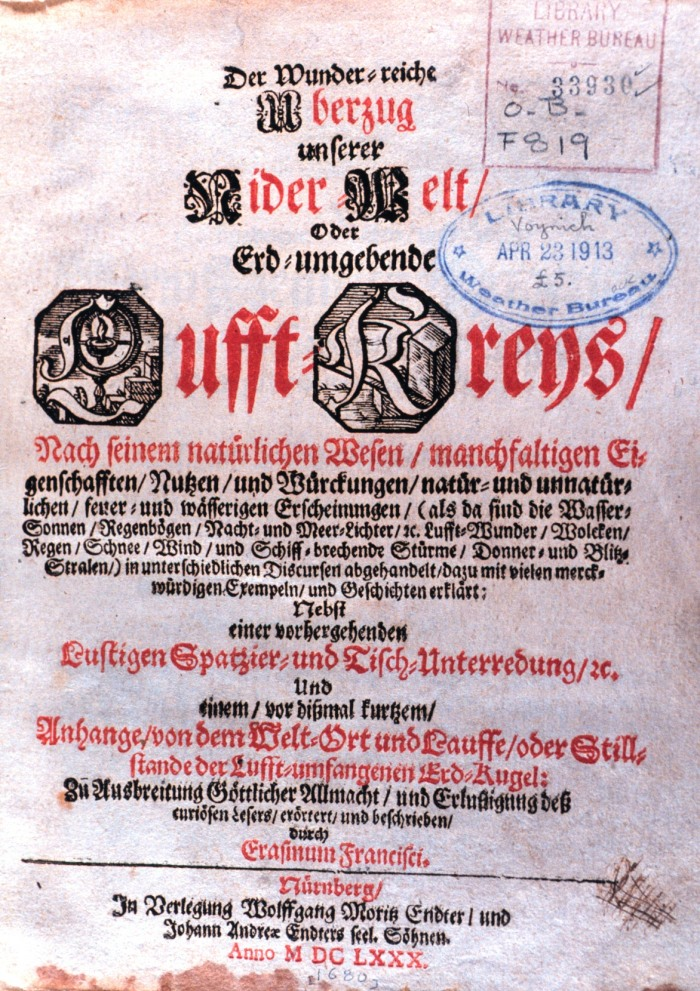
  title of Der Wunderreiche Überzug unserer Nider-Welt
- Der Wunder=reiche Überzug unserer Nider=Welt oder Erd=umgebende Lufft-Kreys Nürnberg 1680
- Lorbeerkranz der christl. Rittersleute, 1680
- Letzte Rechenschaften jeglicher Menschen, 1681
- Ehr- u. freudenreiches Wohl der Ewigkeit f. die Verächter der Eitelkeit, in 52 Betrachtungen erwogen, 1683
- Der hohe Traur-Saal oder Steigen und Fallen großer Herren. Fürstellend aus allen vier Welt-Theilen, unterschiedlicher hoher Standes-Staats und Glücks-Personen wunderbare und traurige Veränderungen, so in den nechsten anderthalb hundert Jahren ... sich gefüget 1665 (Mit 3 Fortsetzungen, Gesamtausgabe Nürnberg: Endter 1669-81)
- Der Höllische Proteus, oder Tausendkünstige Versteller, vermittelst Erzehlung der vielfältigen Bild-Verwechslungen Erscheinender Gespenster, Werffender und poltrender Geister, gespenstischer Vorzeichen der Todes-Fälle, Wie auch Andrer abentheurlicher Händel, arglistiger Possen, und seltsamer Aufzüge dieses verdammten Schauspielers, und, Von theils Gelehrten, für den menschlichen Lebens-Geist irrig-angesehenen Betriegers, (nebenst vorberichtlichem Grund-Beweis der Gewissheit, daß es würcklich Gespenster gebe) 2. Aufl., Nürnberg: Endter 1695
