= Gasparo Berti =

Italian mathematician and physicist

Gasparo Berti (c. 1600 – 1643) was an Italian mathematician, astronomer and physicist. He was probably born in Mantua and spent most of his life in Rome. He is most famous today for his experiment in which he unknowingly created the first working barometer. Though he was best known for his work in mathematics and physics, little of his work in either survives.

== Scientific investigations ==
=== Baliani's siphon experiment ===
In 1630, Giovanni Battista Baliani sent a letter to Galileo Galilei after he noticed that his siphon could not raise water more than about 10 m (34 feet). Galileo proposed that a vacuum held the water up and that it could not hold any more. At the time the existence of vacuums was controversial.

=== Berti's vacuum experiment ===
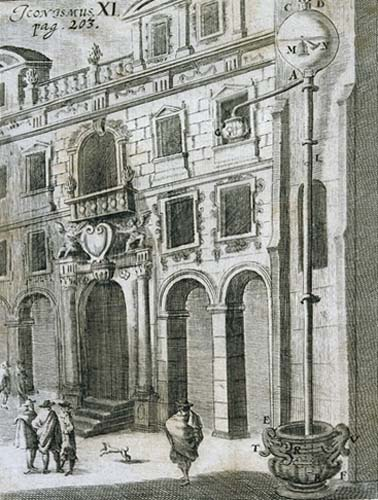
Gasparo Berti's experiment in atmospheric pressure

Galileo's ideas, presented in his Discorsi (Two New Sciences), reached Rome in December 1638. Upon reading Galileo's theory, physicists Gasparo Berti and father Raffaello Magiotti decided to seek a better way to test the possibility of producing a vacuum. Magiotti devised such an experiment. Four accounts of the experiment exist, all written some years later. No exact date was given, but since Two New Sciences reached Rome in December 1638, and Berti died before January 2, 1644, science historian W. E. Knowles Middleton places the event to sometime between 1639 and 1643. Present were Berti, Magiotti, Jesuit polymath Athanasius Kircher, and probably Jesuit physicist Niccolò Zucchi.

Berti built an 11 m lead tube, filled it with water, and sealed both ends. He submerged one end in a basin of water and unsealed it. Though some of the water flowed out, much of it remained, filling the tube to about 10 m (34 feet) above the water level in the basin, the same height as in Baliani's siphon.

What was most important about this experiment was that the lowering water had left a space above it in the tube which had no intermediate contact with air to fill it up. Berti claimed that in this space was a vacuum. His claim was strongly contested however, and multiple experiments were performed attempting to disprove the existence of a vacuum. Berti's experiment led to Evangelista Torricelli's research into the weight of air and his invention of the barometer.

=== Chair of mathematics ===
Berti held a chair of mathematics at the University of Rome La Sapienza. He was to succeed Benedetto Castelli as professor of mathematics there, but he died in Rome before he could begin teaching. He also mapped the Roman catacombs.
