= Torricellian chamber =

Low pressure air space in a flooded cave chamber

In cave diving, a Torricellian chamber is a cave chamber with an airspace above the water at less than atmospheric pressure. This is formed when the water level drops and there is no way for more air to get into the chamber. Surfacing in such chambers could pose an increased risk of decompression sickness to divers, equivalent to flying after diving or an ascent to altitude equivalent to the chamber surface pressure. Also, in a Torricellian chamber the diver's depth gauge is unlikely to give an accurate reading of pressure as most depth gauges are not calibrated to measure depths less than zero. Dive computers generally indicate that the diver has surfaced when the pressure drops to less than about 1msw.

The chambers are named after Evangelista Torricelli, inventor of the barometer.
