= Evangelista Torricelli =

Italian physicist and mathematician (1608–1647)

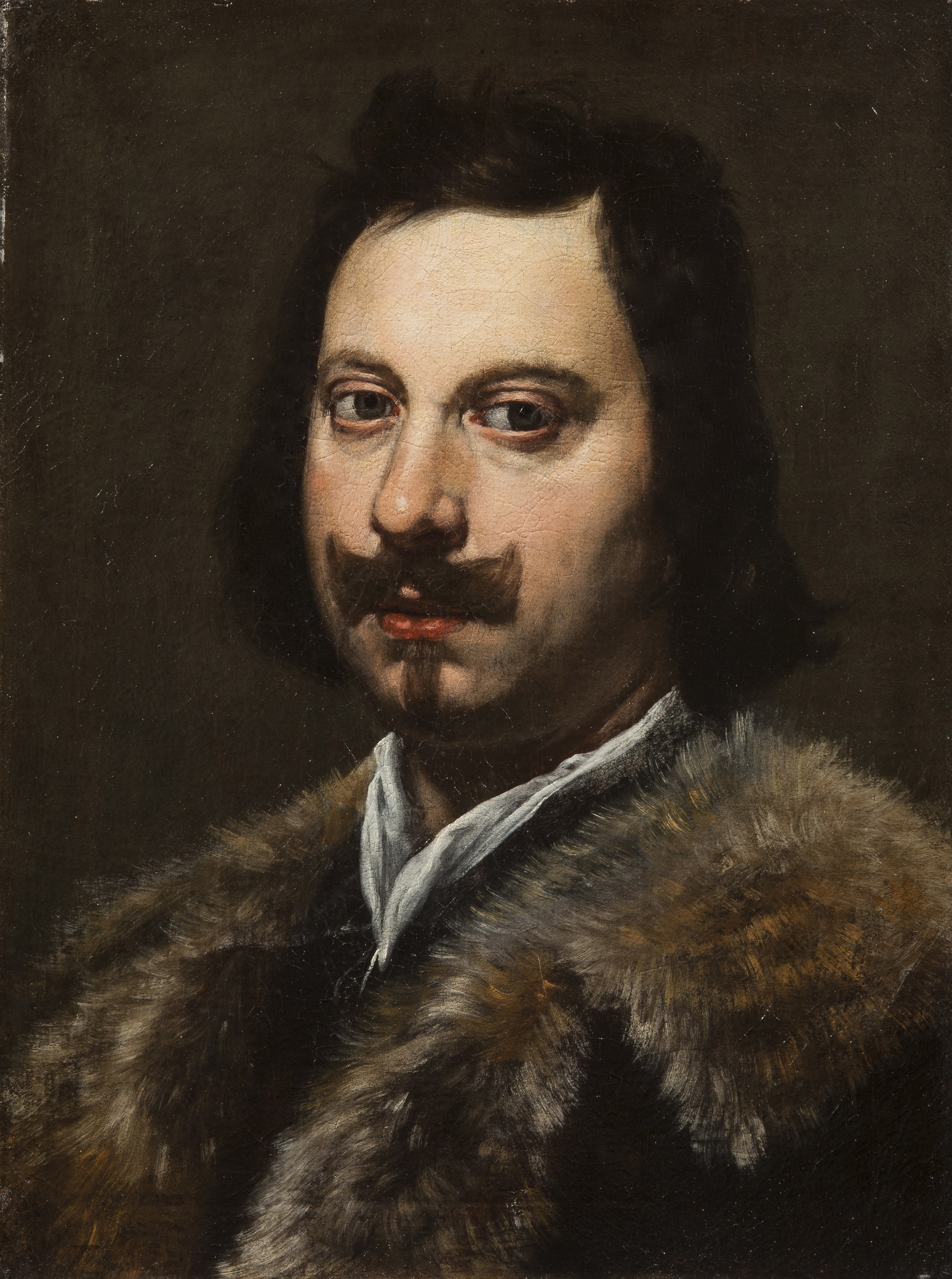
- Evangelista Torricelli by Lorenzo Lippi (c. 1647)
- Born: 15 October 1608; Rome, Papal States
- Died: 25 October 1647 (aged 39); Florence, Grand Duchy of Tuscany
- Education: Sapienza University of Rome
- Known for: Barometer; Torricelli's experiment Torricelli's equation Torricelli's law Torricelli point Torricelli's trumpet Torricellian vacuum
- Scientific career
- Fields: Physics; Mathematics; Philosophy
- Workplaces: University of Pisa
- Academic advisors: Benedetto Castelli
- Notable students: Vincenzo Viviani

Signature
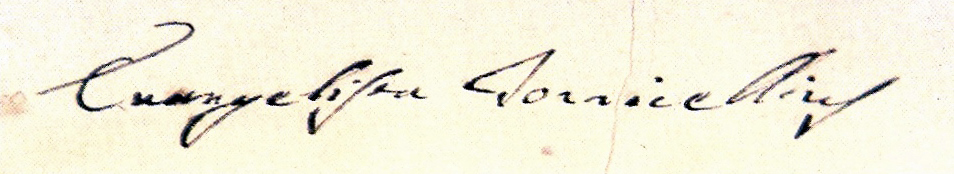

Evangelista Torricelli (/ˌtɒriˈtʃɛli/ TORR-ee-CHEL-ee, Italian: [evandʒeˈlista torriˈtʃɛlli]; 15 October 1608 – 25 October 1647) was an Italian physicist and mathematician, and a student of Benedetto Castelli. He is best known for his invention of the barometer, but is also known for his advances in optics and work on the method of indivisibles. The torr is named after him.

== Biography ==
=== Early life ===
Torricelli was born on 15 October 1608 in Rome, the firstborn child of Gaspare Ruberti and Giacoma Torricelli. His family was from Faenza (in the current Province of Ravenna), then part of the Papal States. His father was a textile worker and the family was very poor. Seeing his talents, his parents sent him to be educated in Faenza, under the care of his uncle, Giacomo (James), a Camaldolese monk, who first ensured that his nephew was given a sound basic education. He then entered young Torricelli into a Jesuit College in 1624, possibly the one in Faenza itself, to study mathematics and philosophy until 1626, by which time his father, Gaspare, had died. The uncle then sent Torricelli to Rome to study science under the Benedictine monk Benedetto Castelli, professor of mathematics at the Collegio della Sapienza (now known as the Sapienza University of Rome). Castelli was a student of Galileo Galilei. "Benedetto Castelli made experiments on running water (1628), and he was entrusted by Pope Urban VIII with hydraulic undertakings." There is no actual evidence that Torricelli was enrolled at the university. It is almost certain that Torricelli was taught by Castelli. In exchange he worked for him as his secretary from 1626 to 1632 in a private arrangement. Because of this, Torricelli was exposed to experiments funded by Pope Urban VIII. While living in Rome, Torricelli became also the student of the mathematician Bonaventura Cavalieri, with whom he became great friends. It was in Rome that Torricelli also became friends with two other students of Castelli, Raffaello Magiotti and Antonio Nardi. Galileo referred to Torricelli, Magiotti, and Nardi affectionately as his "triumvirate" in Rome.

=== Career ===
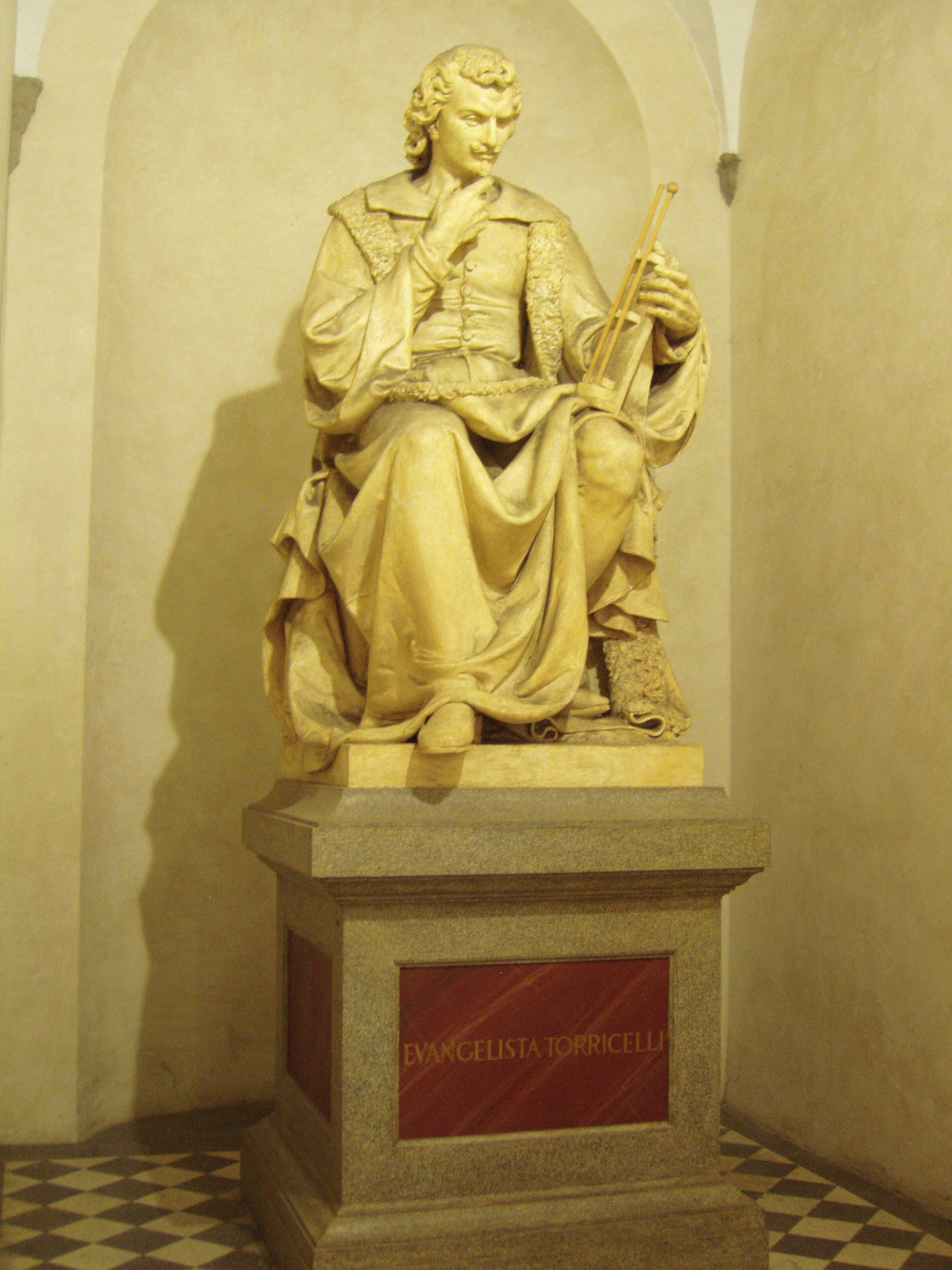
Torricelli's statue in the Museo di Storia Naturale di Firenze

In 1632, shortly after the publication of Galileo's Dialogue Concerning the Two Chief World Systems, Torricelli wrote to Galileo of reading it "with the delight ... of one who, having already practiced all of geometry most diligently ... and having studied Ptolemy and seen almost everything of Tycho Brahe, Kepler and Longomontanus, finally, forced by the many congruences, came to adhere to Copernicus, and was a Galileian in profession and sect". (The Vatican condemned Galileo in June 1633, and this was the only known occasion on which Torricelli openly declared himself to hold the Copernican view.)

Aside from several letters, little is known of Torricelli's activities in the years between 1632 and 1641, when Castelli sent Torricelli's monograph of the path of projectiles to Galileo, then under house arrest in his villa at Arcetri. Although Galileo promptly invited Torricelli to visit, Torricelli did not accept until just three months before Galileo's death. The reason for this was that Torricelli's mother, Caterina Angetti died. "(T)his short intercourse with the great mathematician enabled Torricelli to finish the fifth dialogue under the personal direction of its author; it was published by Vincenzo Viviani, a pupil of Galileo, in 1674." After Galileo's death on 8 January 1642, Grand Duke Ferdinando II de' Medici asked Torricelli to succeed Galileo as the grand-ducal mathematician and chair of mathematics at the University of Pisa. Right before the appointment, Torricelli was considering returning to Rome because of there being nothing left for him in Florence, where he had invented the barometer. In this new role he solved some of the great mathematical problems of the day, such as finding a cycloid's area and center of gravity. As a result of this study, he wrote the book the Opera Geometrica in which he described his observations. The book was published in 1644.

Little was known about Torricelli in regard to his works in geometry when he accepted the honorable position, but after he published Opera Geometrica two years later, he became highly esteemed in that discipline. "He was interested in Optics, and invented a method whereby microscopic lenses might be made of glass which could be easily melted in a lamp." As a result, he designed and built a number of telescopes and simple microscopes; several large lenses, engraved with his name, are still preserved in Florence. On 11 June 1644, he famously wrote in a letter to Michelangelo Ricci:

Noi viviamo sommersi nel fondo d'un pelago d'aria. (We live submerged at the bottom of an ocean of air.)

However his work on the cycloid involved him in a controversy with Gilles de Roberval, who accused him of plagiarizing his earlier solution of the problem of its quadrature. Although it appears that Torricelli reached his solution independently, the matter was still in dispute up to his death.

=== Death ===
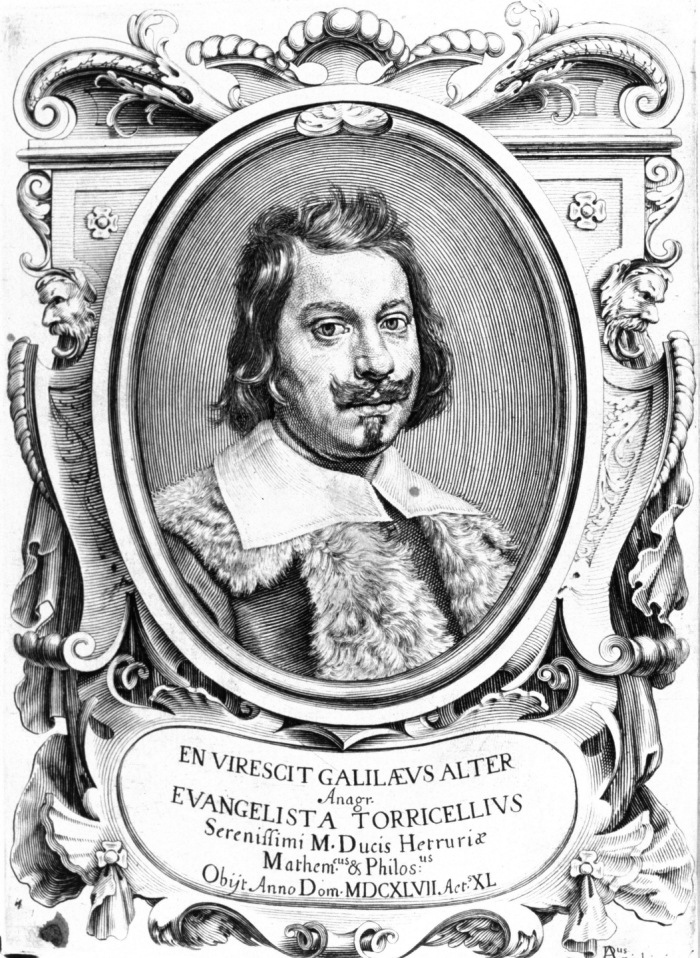
Evangelista Torricelli portrayed on the frontpage of Lezioni d'Evangelista Torricelli

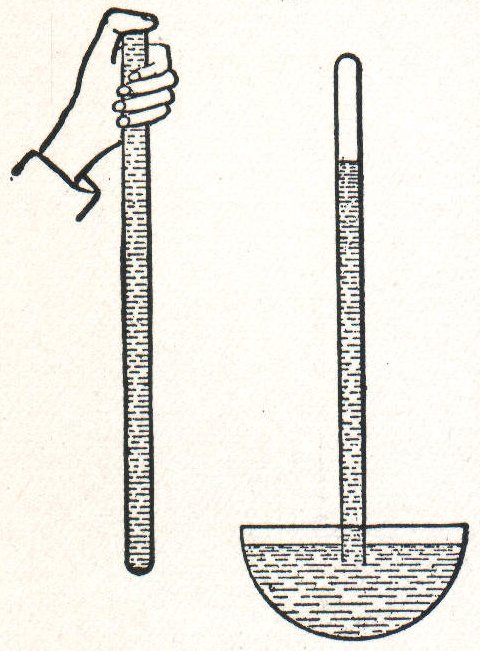
Torricelli's experiment

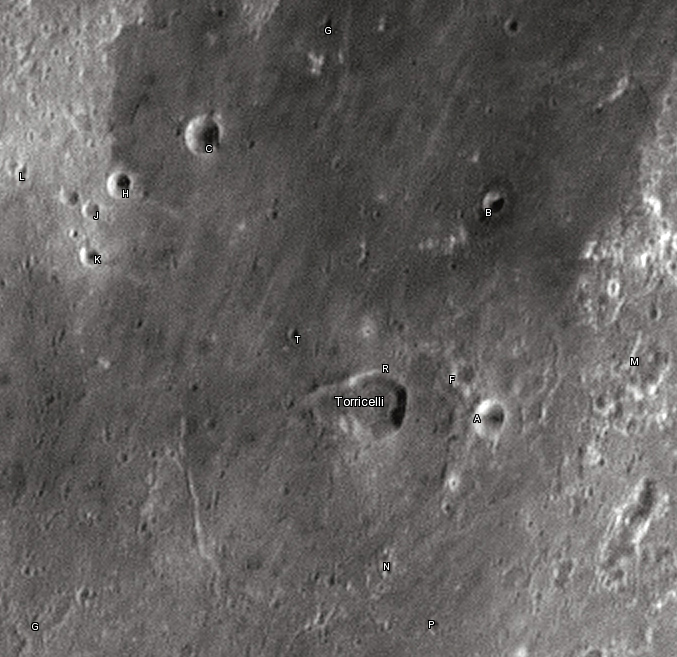
Torricelli lunar crater map

Torricelli died of fever, most likely typhoid, in Florence on 25 October 1647, 10 days after his 39th birthday, and was buried at the Basilica of San Lorenzo. He left all his belongings to his adopted son Alessandro. "Belonging to that first period are his pamphlets on Solidi spherali, Contatti and the major part of the propositions and sundry problems which were gathered together by Viviani after Torricelli's death. This early work owes much to the study of the classics." Sixty-eight years after Torricelli had died, his genius still filled his contemporaries with admiration, as evidenced by the anagram below the frontispice of Lezioni accademiche d'Evangelista Torricelli published in 1715: En virescit Galileus alter, meaning "Here blossoms another Galileo."

=== Honours ===
In Faenza, a statue of Torricelli was created in 1868 in gratitude for all that Torricelli had done in advancing science during his short lifetime.

The asteroid 7437 Torricelli and a crater on the Moon were named in his honour.

The mountain range Torricelli Mountains on New Guinea carry his name.

In 1830, botanist Augustin Pyramus de Candolle published Torricellia, which is a genus of flowering plants from Asia belonging to the family Torricelliaceae. They were named in Evangelista Torricelli's honour.

== Torricelli's work in physics ==
The perusal of Galileo's Two New Sciences (1638) inspired Torricelli with many developments of the mechanical principles there set forth, which he embodied in a treatise De motu (printed amongst his Opera geometrica, 1644). Its communication by Castelli to Galileo in 1641, with a proposal that Torricelli should reside with him, led to Torricelli traveling to Florence, where he met Galileo, and acted as his amanuensis during the three remaining months of his life.

=== Suction pumps and the invention of the barometer ===
Torricelli's work led to first speculations about atmospheric pressure, and to the corollary invention of the mercury barometer (from the Greek word baros, meaning weight) -- the principle of which was described as early as 1631 by René Descartes, although there is no evidence that Descartes ever built such an instrument.

The barometer arose from the need to solve a theoretical and practical problem: a suction pump could only raise water up to a height of 10 metres (34 ft) (as recounted in Galileo's Two New Sciences). In the early 1600s, Torricelli's teacher, Galileo, argued that suction pumps were able to draw water from a well because of the "force of vacuum." This argument, however, failed to explain the fact that suction pumps could only raise water to a height of 10 metres.

After Galileo's death, Torricelli proposed, rather, that we live in a "sea of air" that exerts a pressure analogous in many ways to the pressure of water on submerged objects. According to this hypothesis, at sea level, the air in the atmosphere has weight that roughly equals the weight of a 10-meter column of water. When a suction pump creates a vacuum inside a tube, the atmosphere no longer pushes on the water column below the piston but still pushes down on the surface of the water outside, thus causing the water to rise until its weight counterbalances the weight of the atmosphere. This hypothesis might have led him to a striking prediction: That a suction pump might only raise mercury, which is 13 times heavier than water, to 1/13 the height of the water column (76 centimeters) in a similar pump. (It is possible however that Torricelli carried out the mercury experiment first, and then formulated his sea of air hypothesis.)

In 1643, Torricelli filled a meter-long tube (with one end sealed off) with mercury—thirteen times denser than water—and set the open end of the tube into a basin of the liquid metal and raised the sealed end so the tube stood vertically. The mercury level in the tube fell until it was about 76 centimetres (30 in) above the surface of the mercury basin, producing a Torricellian vacuum above. This was also the first recorded incident of creating permanent vacuum.

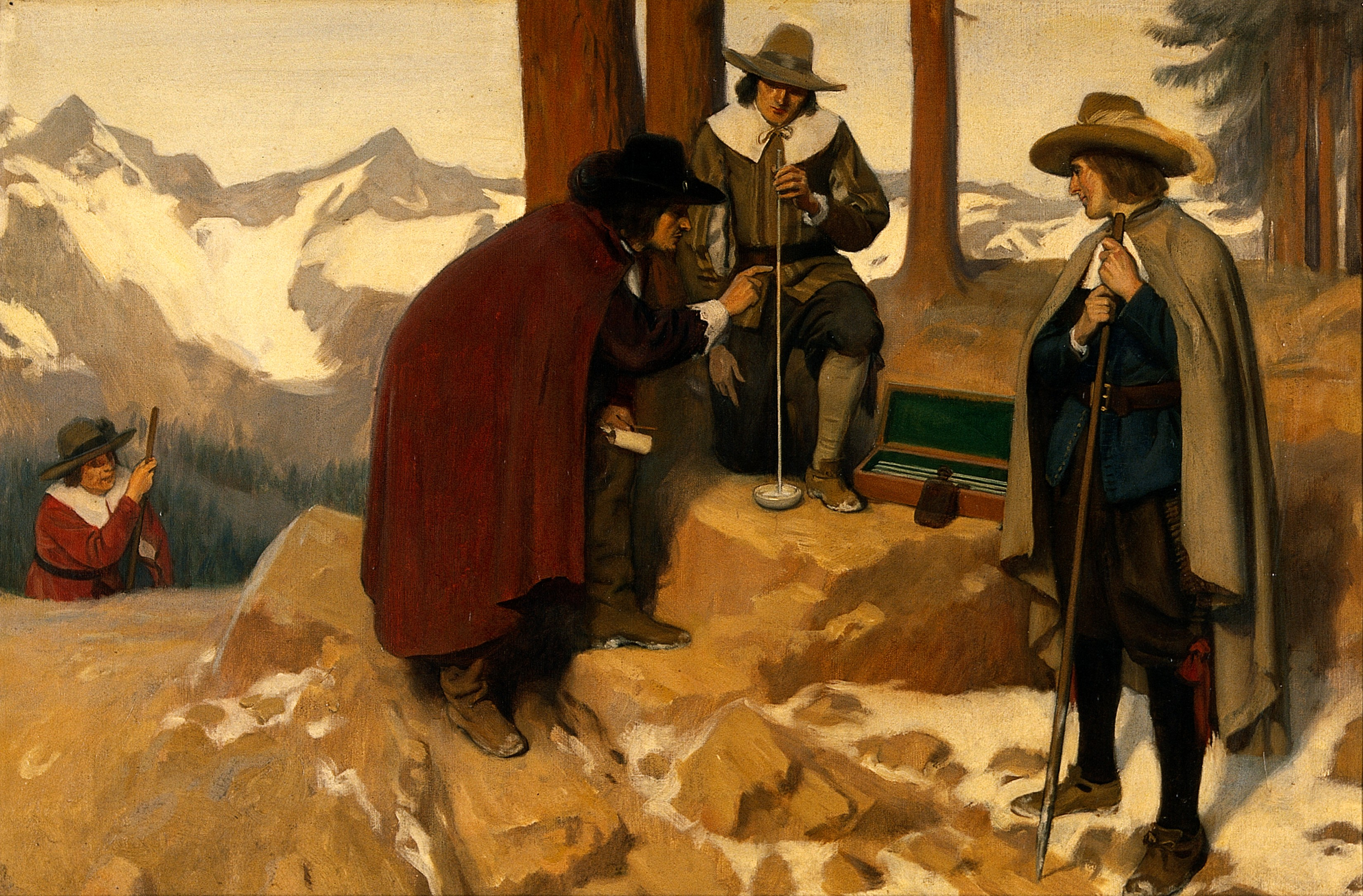
Torricelli experimenting in the Alps, 1643

A second unambiguous prediction of Torricelli's sea of air hypothesis was made by Blaise Pascal, who argued, and proved, that the mercury column of the barometer should drop at higher elevations. Indeed, it dropped slightly on top of a 50-meter bell tower, and much more so at the peak of a 1460-meter mountain.

As we know now, the column's height fluctuates with atmospheric pressure at the same location, a fact which plays a key role in weather forecasting. Baseline changes in the column's height at different elevations, in turn, underlie the principle of the altimeter. Thus, this work laid the foundations for the modern concept of atmospheric pressure, the first barometer, an instrument that would later play a key role in weather forecasting, and the first pressure altimeter, which measures altitude and is often used in hiking, climbing, skiing, and aviation.

The solution to the suction pump puzzle and the discovery of the principle of the barometer and altimeter have perpetuated Torricelli's fame with terms such as "Torricellian tube" and "Torricellian vacuum". The torr, a unit of pressure used in vacuum measurements, is named after him.

=== Torricelli's law ===
Torricelli also discovered a law, regarding the speed of a fluid flowing out of an opening, which was later shown to be a particular case of Bernoulli's principle. He found that water leaks out a small hole in the bottom of a container at a rate proportional to the square root of the depth of the water. So if the container is an upright cylinder with a small leak at the bottom and y is the depth of the water at time t, then

$$\frac{dy}{dt} = -k \sqrt{y}$$

for some constant k > 0.

=== Torricelli's principle ===
The concept of center of gravity was discovered by Archimedes. Torricelli, following in his footsteps, discovered an important new principle, Torricelli's principle, which says: if any number of bodies be so connected that, by their motion, their centre of gravity can neither ascend nor descend, then those bodies are in equilibrium. This is essentially a version of the principle of virtual work. This principle was later used by Christiaan Huygens to study pendulum motion.

=== The study of projectiles ===
Torricelli studied projectiles and how they traveled through the air. "Perhaps his most notable achievement in the field of projectiles was to establish for the first time the idea of an envelope: projectiles sent out at [...] the same speed in all directions trace out parabolas which are all tangent to a common paraboloid. This envelope became known as the parabola di sicurezza (parabola of safety)."

=== Cause of wind ===
Torricelli gave the first scientific description of the cause of wind:

... winds are produced by differences of air temperature, and hence density, between two regions of the earth.

== Torricelli's work in mathematics ==
Torricelli is also famous for the discovery of the Torricelli's trumpet (also - perhaps more often - known as Gabriel's Horn) whose surface area is infinite, but whose volume is finite. This was seen as an "incredible" paradox by many at the time, including Torricelli himself, and prompted a fierce controversy about the nature of infinity, also involving the philosopher Hobbes.

Torricelli was also a pioneer in the area of infinite series. In his De dimensione parabolae of 1644, Torricelli considered a decreasing sequence of positive terms $a_0, a_1, a_2, \ldots$ and showed the corresponding telescoping series $(a_0-a_1) + (a_1-a_2) + \cdots$ necessarily converges to $a_0-L$, where L is the limit of the sequence, and in this way gives a proof of the formula for the sum of a geometric series.

Torricelli developed further the method of indivisibles of Cavalieri. Many 17th century mathematicians learned of the method through Torricelli whose writing was more accessible than Cavalieri's.

== Italian submarines ==
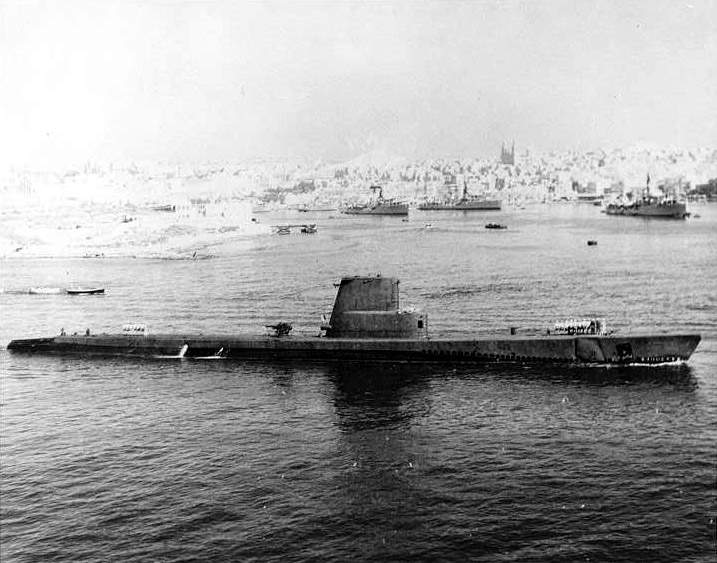
Torricelli (S-512);0837310

Several Italian Navy submarines were named after Evangelista Torricelli:

- A Micca class submarine, built in 1918, stricken in 1930
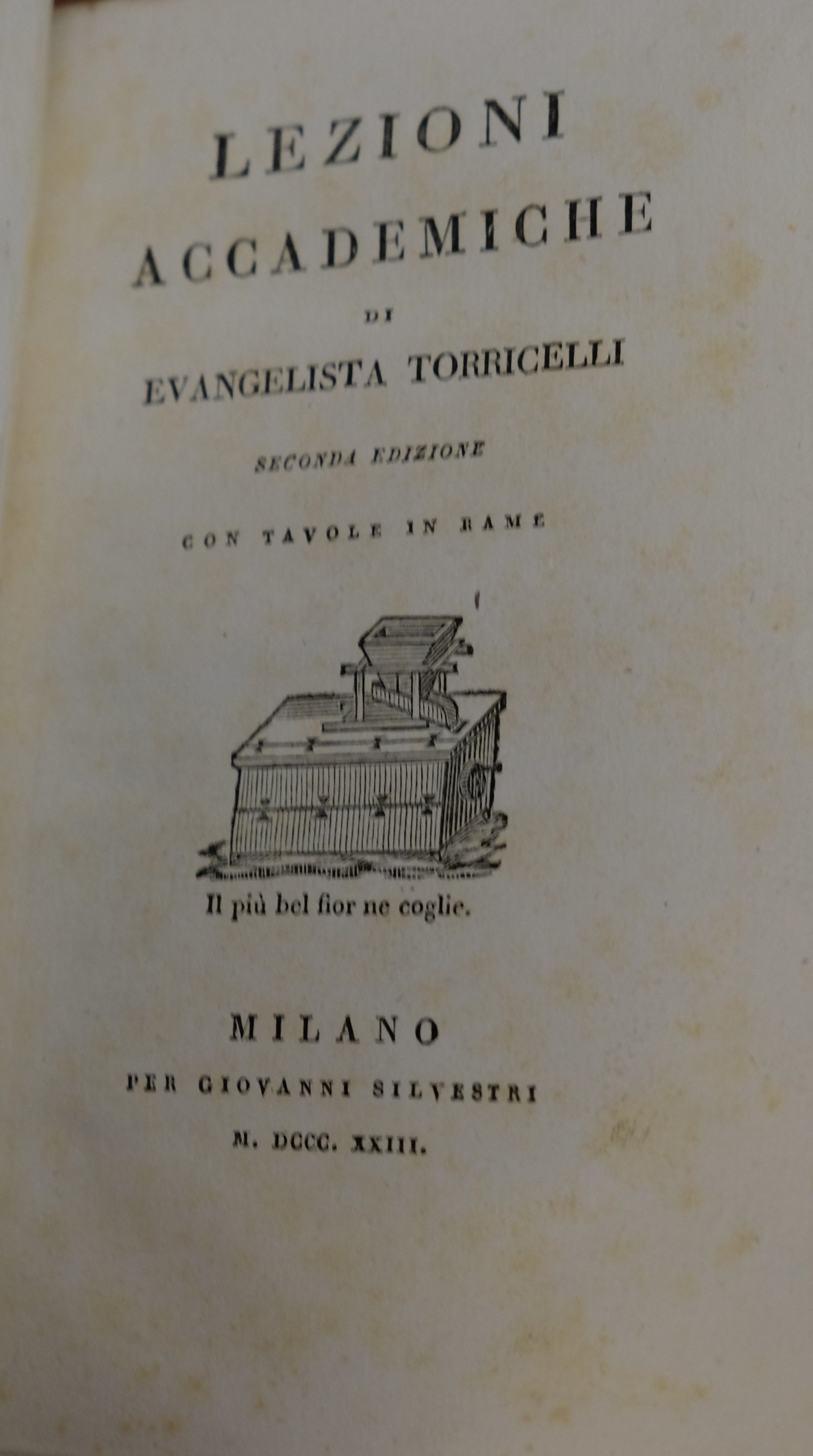
- Title page to an 1823 copy of Lezioni accademiche
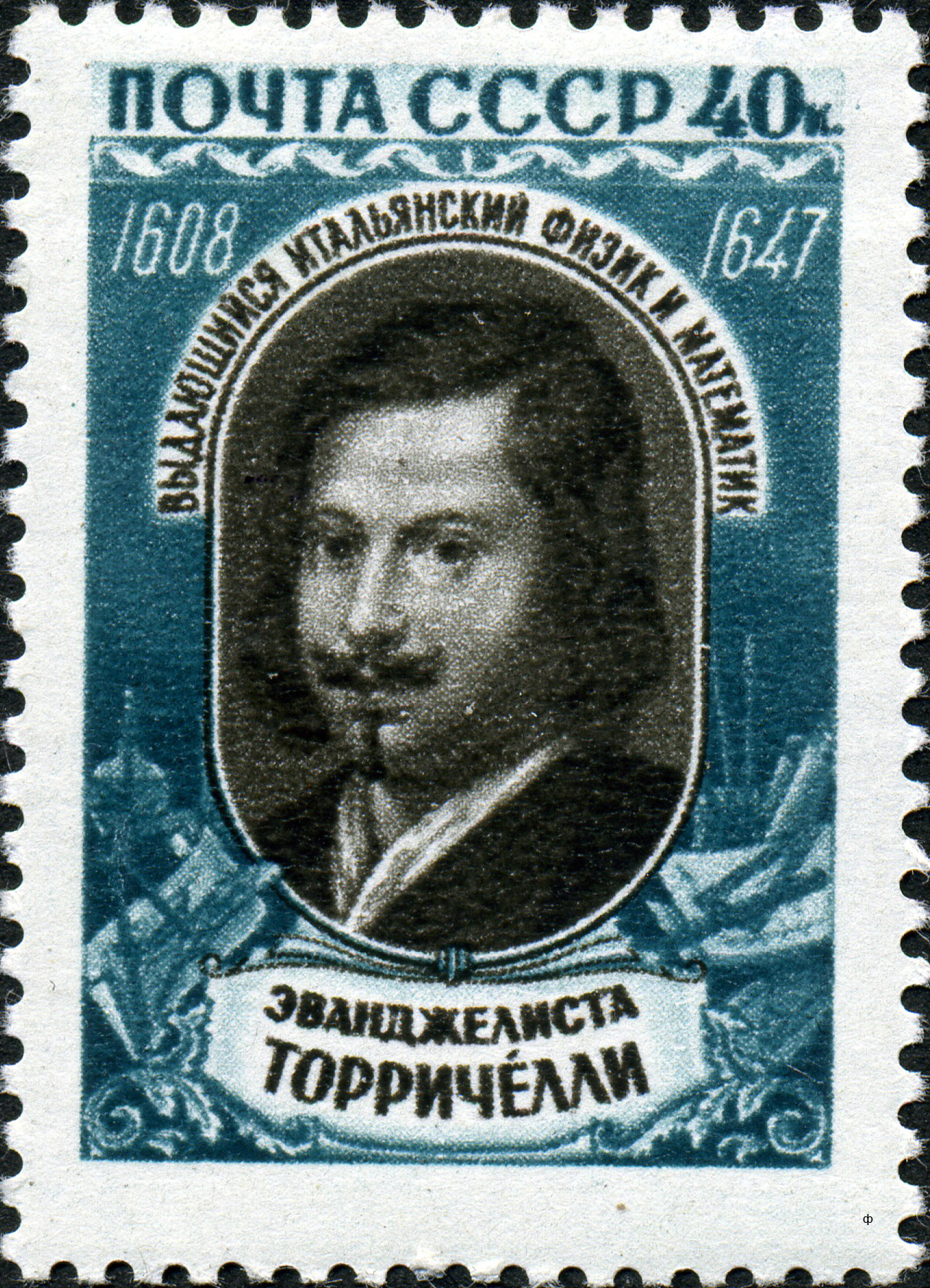
  1959 Evangelista Torricelli commemorative stamp of the U.S.S.R.
  An Archimede class submarine (1934), transferred to Spain in 1937 and renamed General Mola, stricken in 1959
- A Benedetto Brin class submarine (1937), sank in the Red Sea due to the British Navy in 1940
- Evangelista Torricelli, the former USS Lizardfish, transferred to Italy in 1960 and decommissioned in 1976

== Selected works ==
His original manuscripts are preserved at Florence, Italy. The following have appeared in print:

- Trattato del moto (before 1641)
- Opera geometrica (1644)
- Lezioni accademiche (Firenze, 1715)
- Esperienza dell'argento vivo (Berlin, 1897)

== See also ==
- Geometric median
- Logarithmic spiral
- Torricellian chamber
- Vena contracta
- Gasparo Berti
- Stefano degli Angeli
