= Cartesian diver =

Classic science experiment demonstrating the Archimedes' principle and the ideal gas law

Floating and sinking demonstration (Cartesian diver). The tube is filled with water and air. When pressing the bottle, the additional water enters the test tube, thus increasing the average density of the system tube-water-air, resulting with negative buoyancy and the tube sinks.

Dancing Cartesian Devil

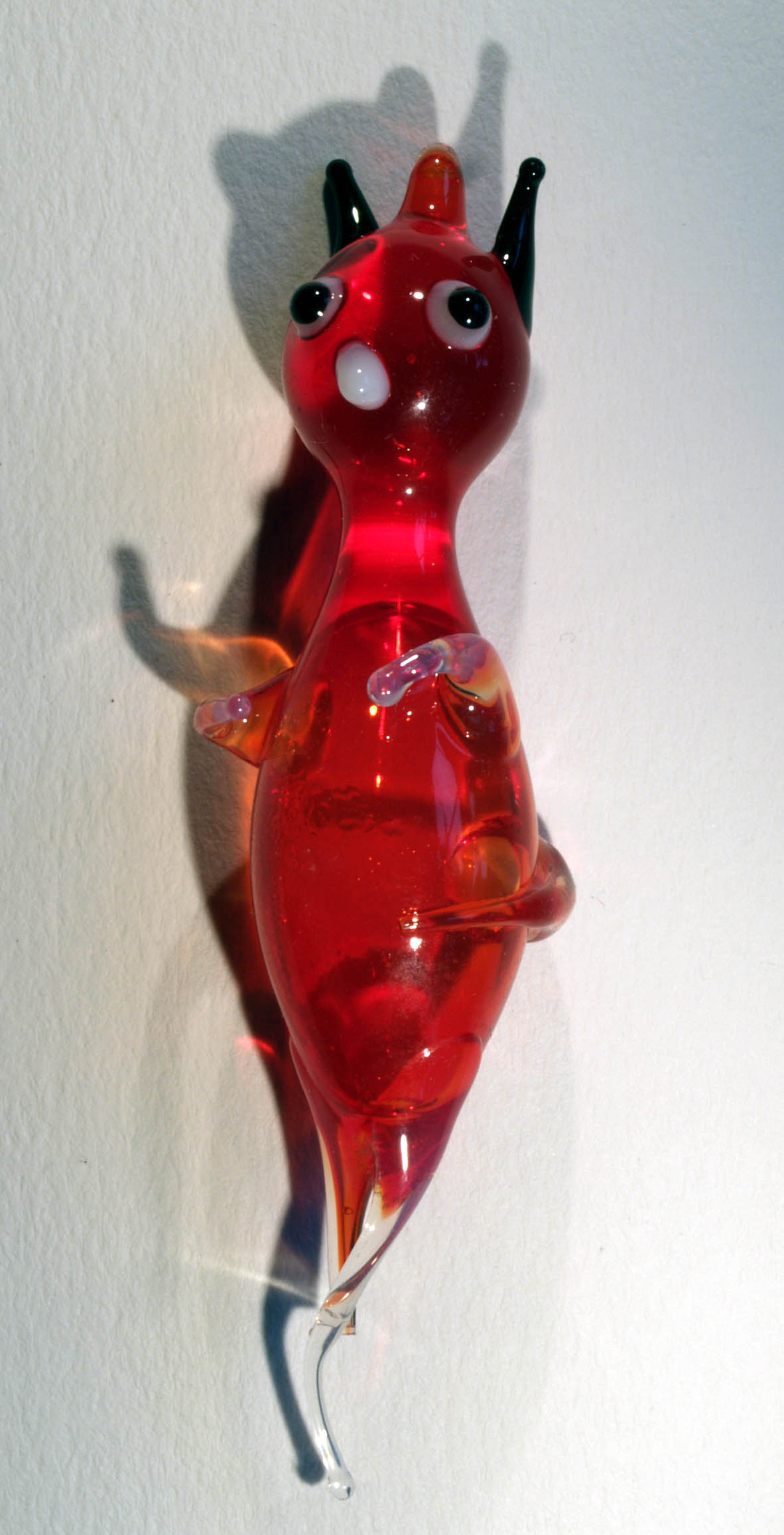
Hand blown glass toy from Lauscha, Thuringian Forest

In the bottle

A Cartesian diver or Cartesian devil is a classic science experiment which demonstrates the principle of buoyancy (Archimedes' principle) and the ideal gas law. The first written description of this device is provided by Raffaello Magiotti, in his book Renitenza certissima dell'acqua alla compressione (Very firm resistance of water to compression) published in 1648. It is named after René Descartes as the toy is said to have been invented by him.

The principle is used to make small toys often called "water dancers" or "water devils". The principle is the same, but the eyedropper is instead replaced with a decorative object with the same properties which is a tube of near-neutral buoyancy, for example, a blown-glass bubble. If the tail of the glass bubble is given a twist, the flow of the water into and out of the glass bubble creates spin. This causes the toy to spin as it sinks and rises. An example of such a toy is the red "devil" shown here. The device also has a practical use for measuring the pressure of a liquid.

Plastic divers were given away in American cereal boxes as a free toy in the 1950s, and "Diving Tony," a version of the toy modelled after Kellogg's Frosted Flakes mascot Tony the Tiger, was made available in the 1980s.

== Experiment description ==
A Cartesian diver toy made from a drinking straw, paperclip and plastic bottle: 1. The trapped air in the straw makes the diver slightly buoyant, and it thus floats.; 2. Squeezing the bottle increases the water pressure; as the bubble shrinks, the diver's density increases and it sinks.

The experiment requires a large water-filled bottle, inside which is a "diver": a small, rigid tube, open at one end, very similar to an eyedropper with just enough air so that it is nearly neutrally buoyant, but still buoyant enough that it floats at the top while being almost completely submerged. Two alternative "divers" can be constructed. One sealed but a flexible bulb, and the other a sealed glass bulb (flashlight minus metal base) with wool threads trailing below. The flexible one will compress reducing volume, and the solid glass one will not change, but air bubbles will be trapped in the fibres, and be exposed to the pressure – thus will change volume.

The "diving" occurs when the flexible part of the larger container is pressed inwards, increasing the pressure inside the larger container, causing the "diver" to sink to the bottom until the pressure is released, when it rises back to the surface. If the container is rigid, as with a glass bottle, the cork sealing the bottle would be pressed inwards or drawn outwards.

Inside an oval bottle

A double action diver

There is just enough air in the diver to make it positively buoyant. Therefore, the diver floats at the water's surface. As a result of Pascal's law, squeezing the airtight container increases the pressure of the air, part of which pressure is exerted against the water that constitutes one "wall" of the airtight container. This water in turn exerts additional pressure on the air bubble inside the diver; because the air inside the diver is compressible but the water is an incompressible fluid, the air's volume is decreased but the water's volume does not expand, such that the pressure external to the diver a) forces the water already in the diver further inward and b) drives water from outside the diver into the diver. Once the air bubble becomes smaller and more water enters the diver, the diver displaces a weight of water that is less than its own weight, so it becomes negatively buoyant and sinks in accordance with Archimedes' principle. When the pressure on the container is released, the air expands again, increasing the weight of water displaced and the diver again becomes positively buoyant and floats.

It might be thought that if the weight of displaced water exactly matched the weight of the diver, it would neither rise nor sink, but float in the middle of the container; however, this does not occur in practice. Assuming such a state were to exist at some point, any departure of the diver from its current depth, however small, will alter the pressure exerted on the bubble in the diver due to the change in the weight of the water above it in the vessel. It is an unstable equilibrium. If the diver rises, by even the most minuscule amount, the pressure on the bubble will decrease, it will expand, it will displace more water, and the diver will become more positively buoyant, rising still more quickly. Conversely, should the diver drop by the smallest amount, the pressure will increase, the bubble contract, additional water enter, the diver will become less buoyant, and the rate of the drop will accelerate as the pressure from the water rises still further. This positive reinforcement will amplify any departure from equilibrium, even that due to random thermal fluctuations in the system. A range of constant applied pressures exists that will allow the diver either to float at the surface, or sink to the bottom, but to have it float within the body of the liquid for an extended period would require continuous manipulation of the applied pressure.

Divers inside an oval plastic bottle acquire new interesting properties. Indeed, an oval bottle can increase in volume when it is compressed, and if this happens, the drowned diver can ascend.
