= Parabola of safety =

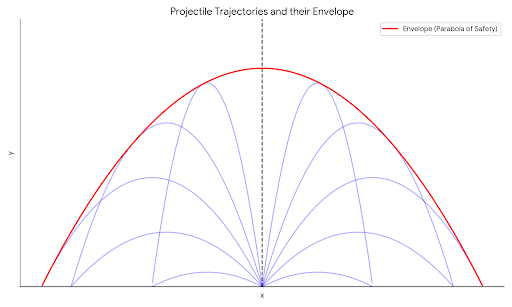
Parabola of Safety

In classical mechanics and ballistics, the parabola of safety or safety parabola is the envelope of the parabolic trajectories of projectiles shot from a certain point with a given speed at different angles to horizon in a fixed vertical plane. The fact that this envelope is a parabola had been first established by Evangelista Torricelli and was later reproven by Johann Bernoulli using the infinitesimal calculus methods of Leibniz.

The paraboloid of revolution obtained by rotating the safety parabola around the vertical axis is the boundary of the safety zone, consisting of all points that cannot be hit by a projectile shot from the given point with the given speed.

== Equations ==
In 2D and shooting on a horizontal plane, parabola of safety can be represented by the equation

$y = \frac{u^2}{2g} - \frac{gx^2}{2u^2}$

where $u$ is the initial speed of projectile and $g$ is the gravitational field.

== Properties ==
- Focus of the parabola is the shooting position.
- Maximum height ($H$) can be calculated by absolute value of $c$ in standard form of parabola. It is given as $H = |c| = \frac{u^2}{2g}$
- Range ($R$) of the projectile can be calculated by the value of latus rectum of the parabola given shooting to the same level. It is given as $R = |4c| = \frac{u^2}{g}$
