= Giovanni Alfonso Borelli =

Italian physiologist, physicist, and mathematician (1608–1670)

- Engraved portrait of Giovanni Alfonso Borelli by Pierre-Roch Vigneron
- Born: 28 January 1608; Naples
- Died: 31 December 1679 (aged 71); Rome
- Burial place: San Pantaleo, Rome
- Education: Sapienza University of Rome
- Scientific career
- Fields: Physiologist, physicist, mathematician
- Academic advisors: Benedetto Castelli
- Notable students: Marcello Malpighi

Giovanni Alfonso Borelli (Italian: [dʒoˈvanni alˈfɔnso boˈrɛlli]; 28 January 1608 – 31 December 1679) was an Italian physiologist, physicist, and mathematician who is often described as the father of biomechanics. He contributed to the modern principle of scientific investigation by continuing Galileo's practice of testing hypotheses against observation. Trained in mathematics, Borelli also made extensive studies of Jupiter's moons, the mechanics of animal locomotion and, in microscopy, of the constituents of blood. He also used microscopy to investigate the stomatal movement of plants, and undertook studies in medicine and geology. During his career, he enjoyed the patronage of Queen Christina of Sweden. He was the first scientist to explain that animal and human bodily movements are caused by muscular contractions.

== Biography ==
Giovanni Borelli was born on 28 January 1608 in the district of Castel Nuovo, in Naples. He was the first-born son of Spanish infantryman Miguel Alfonso and a local woman named Laura Porello (alternately Porelli or Borelli.) Borelli had five siblings.

Borelli eventually travelled to Rome where he studied under Benedetto Castelli, matriculating in mathematics at Sapienza University of Rome. From 1635 to 1656 he served as a Professor of Mathematics in Messina, Sicily. In 1635, the Senate of Messina offered him a membership in the prestigious Accademia della Fucina, which was an intellectual society of scientists devoted to studying and publishing largely on physical and natural sciences under the supervision and protection of the Senate. Borelli was designated to investigate "the causes of the malignant fever that lashed a large part of Italy in 1647. He attributed the cause to an airborne infection and contested the prevailing opinion that the illness was due to excessive heat, humidity, or astrological influences." He even devised a treatment for the disease. While Borelli worked on studying the disease he also continued to study mathematics. In 1658 he published a revised version of Euclid’s Elements called, Euclides Restitutus (Euclid Restored). Euclid was an ancient Greek mathematician whose book had been one of the most important mathematical texts for centuries. Borelli also revised Apollonius of Perga: Conics, a treatise on mathematics that examined parabolas and ellipses. Apollonius of Perga was an ancient Greek astronomer and mathematician.

Around 1655, Borelli was invited to the University of Pisa by Ferdinando De' Medici Grand Duke of Tuscany. Earlier Galileo rejected a recommendation by Benedetto Castelli to nominate Borelli as head of mathematics at the University of Pisa when he left the post himself. Borelli would attain this post in 1656. It was there that he first met the Italian anatomist Marcello Malpighi.

Borelli and Malpighi were both founder-members of the short-lived Accademia del Cimento, an Italian scientific academy founded in 1657. It was here that Borelli, piqued by Malpighi's own studies, began his first investigations into the science of animal movement, or biomechanics. This began an interest that would continue for the rest of his life, eventually earning him the title of the Father of Biomechanics. Borelli's involvement in the Accademia was temporary and the organization itself disbanded shortly after he left.

From 1664 to 1665, Borelli tracked the path of a comet. He took measurements of the comet and concluded that it was moving in an elliptical curved orbit around the sun. These conclusions went against the accepted scientific theory of the day (that was supported and imposed by the Catholic church), which asserted that Earth was the center of the universe. It was dangerous to oppose the theories of the church, so Borelli published his findings under the pseudonym Pier Maria Mutoli. In a treatise titled, Del Movimento della Cometa Apparasa il mese di Dicembre (Of the Movement of the Comet that Appears in the Month of December), Borelli suggested that planets and comets orbit the sun.

Borelli returned to Messina in 1668 in the midst of a political uprising that was growing against the Spanish in Italy. Borelli joined the anti-Spanish forces despite his familial ties to Spain through his father. He changed his surname from his father's name to a variation of his mother's name, likely to hide his ties to the Spanish.

In 1674 Borelli was exiled from Messina to Rome for suspected involvement in the political conspiracy to free Sicily from Spanish rule. Here he first became acquainted with ex-Queen Christina of Sweden who had been forced to give up her crown and exiled to Rome two decades prior as a punishment for converting to Catholicism. In 1672 he served as her personal physician and scientific consultant.

Borelli lived the rest of his years in poverty, teaching mathematics to the religious pupils of the Piarist House of San Pantaleo, not far from Piazza Navona, where he lived since September 1677. During the last years of his life, he worked on his best-known publication De Motu Animalium (On the Movement of Animals), described as "a rigidly mechanical, mathematical and physical analysis of various animal functions...[which] became the bible of the iatromathematical or iatromechanical school...". The book attempted to clarify the cause of muscle fatigue, explain the cause of organ secretion, and explain the concept of pain. Volume I was published in 1680, a few months after Borelli's death. Volume II of the book was published in 1681. Both volumes were dedicated to Christina of Sweden who financed the publication of the book with the help of his Piarist benefactors.

Borelli died in Rome on 31 December 1679 of unknown causes. He was buried in the Church of San Pantaleo, adjacent to the convent of the Piarists Fathers, in the Parione neighborhood, where he had lived during the last two years of his life.

== Scientific achievements ==
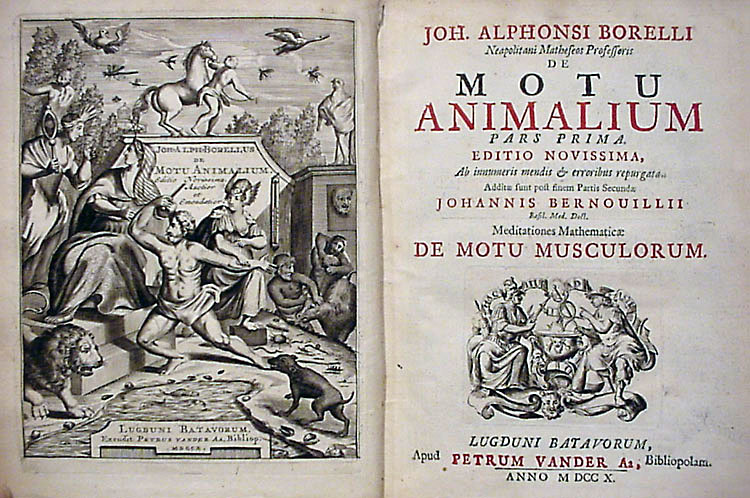
De Motu Animalium I's cover

Borelli's major scientific achievements are focused on his investigation into biomechanics. This work originated with his studies of animals. His publications, De Motu Animalium I and De Motu Animalium II, borrowing their title from the Aristotelian treatise, relate animals to machines and utilize mathematics to prove his theories. The first volume covers biomechanical and muscular action in humans and animals (how muscles move while living beings walk, run, swim, jump, and fly). The second volume discusses the physiology of human organs, namely the lungs and heart. In this volume he concluded that the heart contracted like other muscles, but unlike other muscles it was not attached to any limb. He noted that the purpose of cardiac contraction was to send blood throughout the body.

The anatomists of the 17th century were the first to suggest the contractile movement of muscles. Borelli, however, first suggested that 'muscles do not exercise vital movement otherwise than by contracting.' He was also the first to deny corpuscular influence on the movements of muscles. This was proven through his scientific experiments demonstrating that living muscles did not release corpuscles into the water when cut. Borelli also recognized that forward motion entailed the movement of a body's center of gravity forward, which was then followed by the swinging of its limbs in order to maintain balance. His studies also extended beyond muscle and locomotion. In particular, he likened the action of the heart to that of a piston. For this to work properly he derived the idea that the arteries have to be elastic. For these discoveries, Borelli is labeled as the father of modern biomechanics, and the American Society of Biomechanics uses the Borelli Award as its highest honor for research in the area.

Along with his work on biomechanics, Borelli also had interests in physics, specifically the orbits of the planets. Borelli believed that the planets were revolving as a result of three forces. The first force involved the planets' desire to approach the sun. The second force dictated that the planets were propelled to the side by impulses from sunlight, which is corporeal. Finally, the third force impelled the planets outward due to the sun's revolution. The result of these forces is similar to a stone's orbit when tied on a string. Borelli's measurements of the orbits of satellites of Jupiter are mentioned in Volume 3 of Newton's Principia.

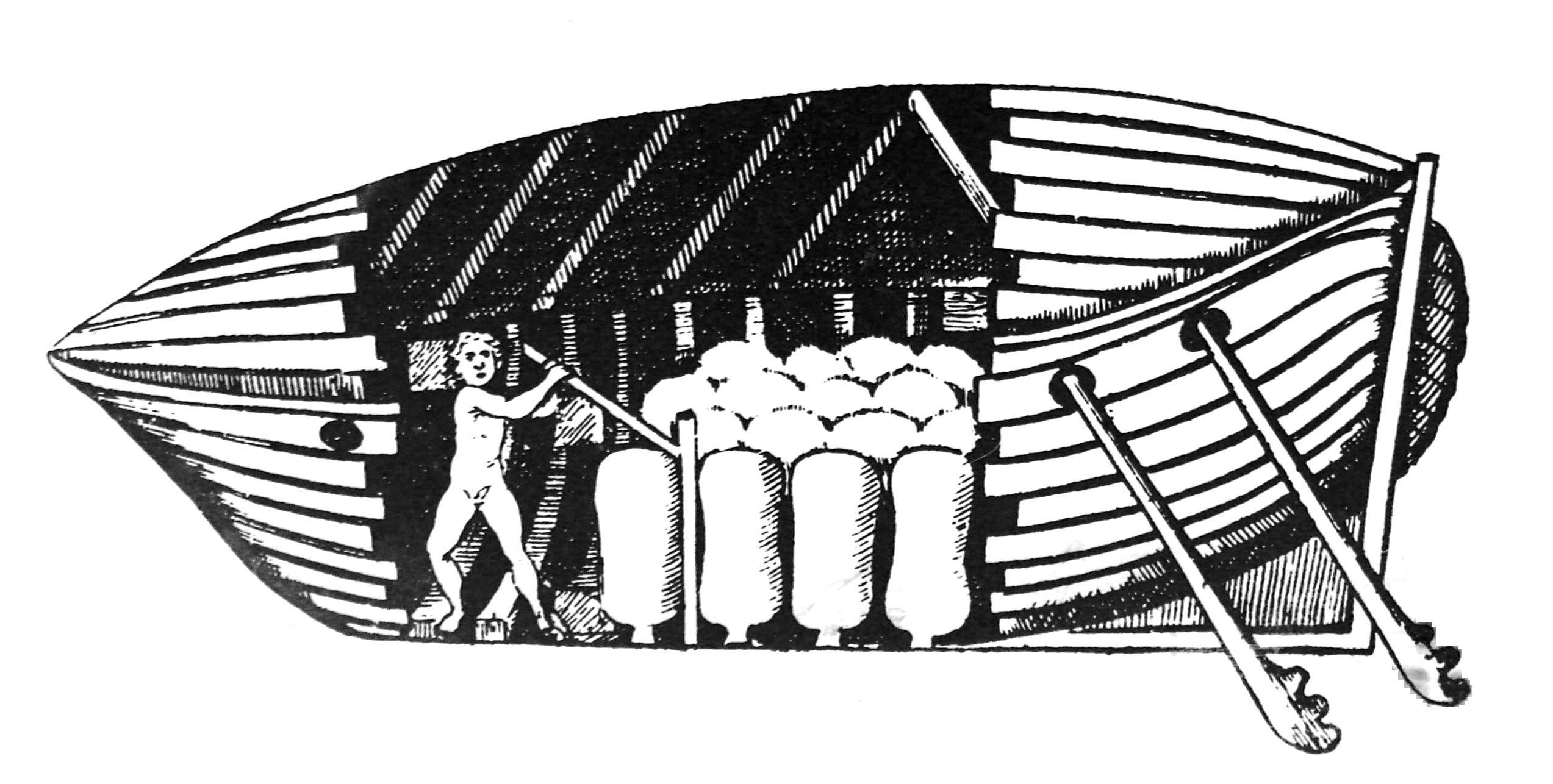
Submarine, by Giovanni Alfonso Borelli, in De Motu Animalium, 1680

Borelli is also considered to be the first person to consider a self-contained underwater breathing apparatus along with his early submarine design. The exhaled gas was cooled by sea water after passing through copper tubing. The helmet was brass with a glass window and 0.6 m (2 ft) in diameter. The apparatus was never likely to be used or tested. He discovered the principle of the heliostat more than sixty years before Willem 's Gravesande.

=== Other works ===
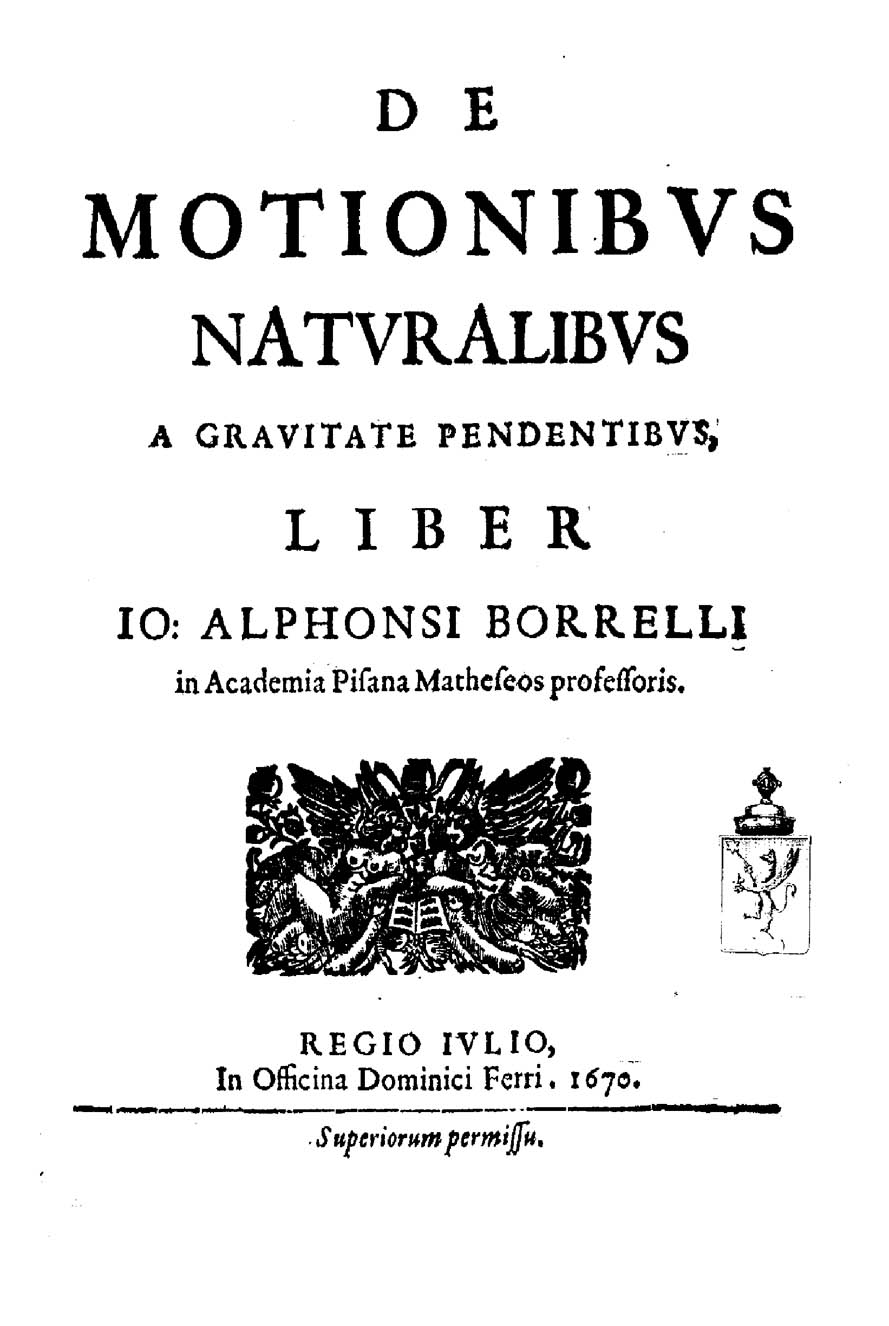
De motionibus naturalibus a gravitate pendentibus, 1670

Borelli also wrote:

- Delle cagioni delle febbri maligne della Sicilia negli anni 1647 e 1648. Cosenza: Gio. Battista Rosso. 1649.
- Euclides Restitutus (in Latin). Pisa: Francesco Onofri. 1658.
- Apollonius (1661). Apollonii Pergaei Conicorum libri V, VI, VII (in Latin). Florence: Ex Typographia Iosephi Cocchini. doi:10.3931/e-rara-8978.
- Theoricae Mediceorum planetarum ex causis physicis deductae (in Latin). Florence: Typographia Ser. Magni Ducis. 1666.
- De vi percussionis (in Latin). Bologna: Ex Typographia Iacobi Montij. 1667.
- Borelli, Giovanni Alfonso (1669). Meteorologia Aetnea (in Latin). Reggio Calabria: Domenico Antonio Ferro. doi:10.3931/e-rara-23716.
- Historia et meteorologia incendii Aetnaei anni 1669 (in Latin). Reggio Calabria: Domenico Antonio Ferro. 1670.
- De motionibus naturalibus a gravitate pendentibus (in Latin). Reggio Calabria: Domenico Antonio Ferro. 1670.

== Sources ==
- Butterfield, H. (1950) The Origins of Modern Science. London: Bell and Sons Ltd.
- Centore, F. (1970) Robert Hooke's Contributions to Mechanics. The Hague: Martinus Nijhoff.
- Gillespie, C. ed. (1971) Dictionary of Scientific Biography. New York: Linda Hall Library.
- Knowles Middleton, W. E. (1973). "Giovanni Alfonso Borelli and the Invention of the Heliostat". Archive for History of Exact Sciences. 10 (3/4/5): 329–341. doi:10.1007/BF00412333. JSTOR 41133367.
- Bertoloni Meli, Domenico (1998). "Giovanni Borelli and the Study of Human Movement: An Historical Review". The British Journal for the History of Science. 31 (4): 383–402. JSTOR 4027873.
- Thurston, A. J. (1999). "Giovanni Borelli and the Study of Human Movement: An Historical Review". Aust. N. Z. J. Surg. 69 (4): 276–88. doi:10.1046/j.1440-1622.1999.01558.x. PMID 10327118.
- Gribbin, J. (2002) The Scientists. Random House. ISBN 1-4000-6013-3
- Favino, Federica (2022). "Giovanni Alfonso Borelli's Last Will (1679, December 31st)". Nuncius. 37: 144–173. doi:10.1163/18253911-bja10020. hdl:11573/1622344. ISSN 0394-7394.
