= Francesco Nazzari =

Italian Catholic priest and scholar

- Born: Francesco Patrizio Nazzari; December 13, 1638; Borgo di Terzo, Bergamo, Republic of Venice
- Died: 19 October 1714 (aged 75); Rome, Papal States
- Occupations: Catholic priest; Scholar
- Known for: founding the Giornale de' Letterati

Francesco Nazzari (13 December 1638 – 19 October 1714) was an Italian Catholic priest and scholar.

== Biography ==
Francesco Nazzari was born on 13 December 1638 in Borgo di Terzo, near Bergamo. He was still young when he was given a philosopher's chair in the Sapienza University of Rome. Following the advice of Michelangelo Ricci, afterwards cardinal, he undertook in 1668 to establish an academic journal in Italian, for which the Journal des sçavans, which appeared a short time before in Paris, served him as a model. His associates, Ricci, Johannes Lucius, Salvatore and Francesco Serra, Tommaso de' Giuli, Giovanni Pastrizio, and Giovanni Ciampini, agreed to furnish him with extracts from works in foreign languages. Nazzari retained the general editorship and the analysis of the French books. He issued this journal, entitled Giornale de' Letterati, until the month of March 1675, from the office of Tinassi; but forced, in consequence of a difference with the latter, to yield his duties to Ciampini, he formed a new society, and published, under the same title, a continuation, which was printed at the office of Carrara until the end of 1679. After having been attached as secretary to Johannes Lucius, a Dalmatian savant, he accompanied, in 1686, the geometrician Adrien Auzout to France, and it is said was very useful to him in the observation of eclipses and celestial revolutions. He died at Rome on October 19, 1714. By his will he left his wealth and his library to the Church of Bergamo, and founded at Rome a college for the scholars of his province. Besides the journal that he has edited, and which has been reprinted at Bologna, with additions, we owe to Nazzari an Italian version of the Exposition de la doctrine de l'Église catholique, by Bossuet (Rome, 1678), and an edition of Diomede Borghesi's Lettere discorsive (Rome, 1701).

== Bibliography ==
- This article incorporates public domain material from McClintock, John; Strong, James (1867–1887). Cyclopædia of Biblical, Theological and Ecclesiastical Literature. Harper and Brothers.
- Weiss, Charles (1842). "Nazzari (François)". In Louis Gabriel Michaud (ed.). Biographie universelle ancienne et moderne. Vol. 30. Paris: C. Delagrave. p. 258.
- Fattorello, Francesco (1934). Le origini del giornalismo moderno in Italia. Udine: Istituto delle edizioni accademiche.
- Gardair, Jean-Michel (1984). Le "Giornale de' letterati de Rome": 1668-1681. Florence: Leo S. Olschki.
- Dooley, Brendan Maurice (1991). Science, Politics, and Society in Eighteenth-Century Italy. The Giornale De' Letterati D'Italia and Its World. Garland Publishing. ISBN 9780815304715.
