= Giovanni Battista Baliani =

Italian mathematician, physicist and astronomer (1582–1666)

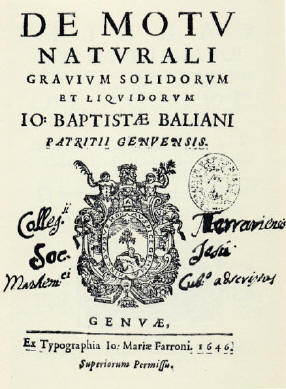
Title page of De motu naturali gravium solidorum et liquidorum, 1646

Giovanni Battista Baliani (1582–1666) was an Italian mathematician, physicist and astronomer.

== Career ==
He was born in Genoa. He was governor of Savona in 1647–1649 and captain of the Republic of Genoa's archers. For some 25 years, he held a correspondence with Galileo Galilei about the time's most innovative scientific theories and experiments.

=== Baliani's siphon experiment ===
On 27 July 1630, Baliani wrote a letter to Galileo explaining an experiment he had made in which a siphon, led over a hill about 21 m high, failed to work. When the end of the siphon was opened in a reservoir, the water level in that limb would sink to about 10 m above the reservoir. Galileo responded with an explanation of the phenomenon: he proposed that it was the power of a vacuum that held the water up, and at a certain height the amount of water simply became too much and the force could not hold any more, like a cord that can support only so much weight.

== Work ==
At Savona, from the Priamar Fortress, he repeated Galileo's experiment of the Tower of Pisa, obtaining more precise measurements which allowed him to underline the effect of air attrition. He also conducted an experiment to show the heat generated by a pot full of water, which he had boiled after rotating it at high speed.

His main work is entitled De motu naturali gravium, fluidorum et solidorum ("About the motion of bodies, fluids and solids"), published in 1638; in it, he was the first to enunciate the law of acceleration of a body and to distinguish between mass and weight. He also studied tides, supporting Galileo's theory that they were generated by the Earth's motion around the Sun. His arguments were published by Giovanni Battista Riccioli in his Almagestum novum (1651) and later resumed by John Wallis and Isaac Newton.

== Death ==
Baliani died in Genoa in 1666.

== Sources ==
- Russo, Lucio (2003). Flussi e riflussi – Indagine sull'origine di una teoria scientifica. Feltrinelli. pp. 114–117.
- Morchio, Renzo (2005). Una biografia della scienza. Mursia. pp. 143–146.
