= Vincenzo Viviani =

Italian mathematician and scientist (1622–1703)

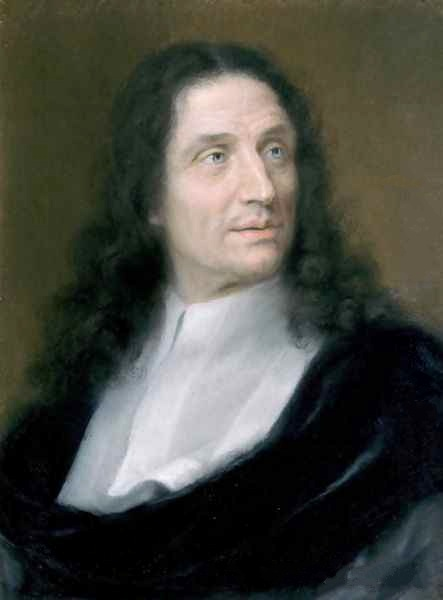
- Born: April 5, 1622; Florence, Grand Duchy of Tuscany
- Died: September 22, 1703 (aged 81); Florence, Grand Duchy of Tuscany
- Known for: Viviani's theorem Viviani's curve
- Scientific career
- Fields: Mathematics, physics
- Academic advisors: Galileo Galilei; Evangelista Torricelli
- Notable students: Isaac Barrow

Vincenzo Viviani (April 5, 1622 – September 22, 1703) was an Italian mathematician and scientist. He was a student of Torricelli and Galileo.

== Biography ==
Vincenzo Viviani was born in Florence to the nobles Jacopo di Michelangelo Viviani and Maria Alamanno del Nente. While attending a Jesuit school Viviani studied the humanities. Following the study of humanities, Viviani turned to mathematics. He studied geometry under the instruction of Galilean follower Clemente Settimi. It was through Clemente that Viviani would gain recognition and meet Clemente's instructor, Tuscan Court mathematician Famiano Michelini. In 1638, Michelini initiated the Grand Duke Ferdinando II de' Medici's interest in Viviani and arranged their introduction in Livorno where Viviani would demonstrate his abilities. The Grand Duke offered Viviani a monthly salary to continue his education and introduced him to Galileo, whose deteriorating health required a capable and competent assistant. Later that year, Viviani was able to expand his knowledge over the philosophy of nature while assisting Galileo on Two new sciences, in which Galileo studied the acceleration of free bodies along an inclined plane. Their frequent exchange over the subject inspired Galileo to elaborate on the mathematical theory and complete his demonstration on free bodies that would establish its connection to nature. Viviani would later use similar applications of mathematics in nature during a collaboration with Nicolaus Steno.

In 1639, Viviani moved to Galileo's home in Arcetri to assist him in his studies before they were joined by Evangelista Torricelli in 1641. Apart from being Galileo's disciple, Viviani became a pupil of Evangelista Torricelli and worked on physics and geometry. Viviani was the last disciple of Galileo until Galileo's death in 1642.

After Torricelli's 1647 death, Viviani was appointed to fill his position at the Accademia dell'Arte del Disegno in Florence. Viviani was also one of the first members of the Grand Duke's experimental academy, the Accademia del Cimento, when it was created a decade later.

Apart from his own career and endeavors, Viviani worked throughout his life to preserve the contributions and life of Galileo. In 1654, Cardinal Leopoldo de’ Medici tasked Viviani with gathering material in order to write a biography about Galileo's life and work. Carlo Manolessi also recruited Viviani to assist him and others in creating a compilation of Galileo's work and coordinating the frontispiece for Galileo's publication.

From 1655 to 1656, Viviani edited the first edition of Galileo's collected works. Viviani tried to publish an account of the life of Galileo, but claimed that his efforts were halted by the Catholic church although this claim has been challenged.

One of the primary interests of Viviani was the study of the mathematics of the ancients. Viviani spent much of his life restoring the works of Aristaeus the Elder and Apollonius.

In 1660, Viviani and Giovanni Alfonso Borelli conducted an experiment to determine the speed of sound. Timing the difference between the seeing the flash and hearing the sound of a cannon shot at a distance, they calculated a value of 350 meters per second (m/s), considerably better than the previous value of 478 m/s obtained by Pierre Gassendi. The currently accepted value is 331.29 m/s at 0 °C or 340.29 m/s at sea level. It has also been claimed that in 1661 he experimented with the rotation of pendulums, 190 years before the famous demonstration by Foucault. Specifically, during experiments with a pendulum, he observed it to veer to one side. He did not make a connection with the rotation of Earth. As it was an unwanted effect, he eliminated it by hanging the pendulum with two ropes.

By 1666, Viviani started to receive many job offers as his reputation as a mathematician grew. That same year, Louis XIV of France offered him a position at the Académie Royale and John II Casimir Vasa of Poland offered Viviani a post as his astronomer. Fearful of losing Viviani, the Grand Duke appointed him First Mathematician of the Tuscan Court. The position was previously held by Galileo, whose death resulted in Torricelli's appointment to the position, followed by Viviani years after Torricelli's death. Viviani accepted this post and turned down his other offers. From 1666 to 1667, Viviani guided Nicolaus Steno on the geometrical propositions of anatomical figures and dissections of shark muscle fibers. The shark dissection figures in Elementorum myologiae specimen, seu musculi descriptio geometri demonstrated the possible functions of anatomical structures by combining anatomy with geometry while observing muscle contractions.

In 1687, he published a book on engineering, Discorso intorno al difendersi da' riempimenti e dalle corrosione de' fiumi.

Upon his death, Viviani left an almost completed work on the resistance of solids, which was subsequently completed and published by Luigi Guido Grandi.

In 1737, the Church finally allowed Galileo to be reburied in a grave with an elaborate monument. The monument that was created in the church of Santa Croce was constructed with the help of funds left by Viviani for that specific purpose. Viviani's own remains were moved to Galileo's new grave as well.

The lunar crater Viviani is named after him.

== Inscriptions ==
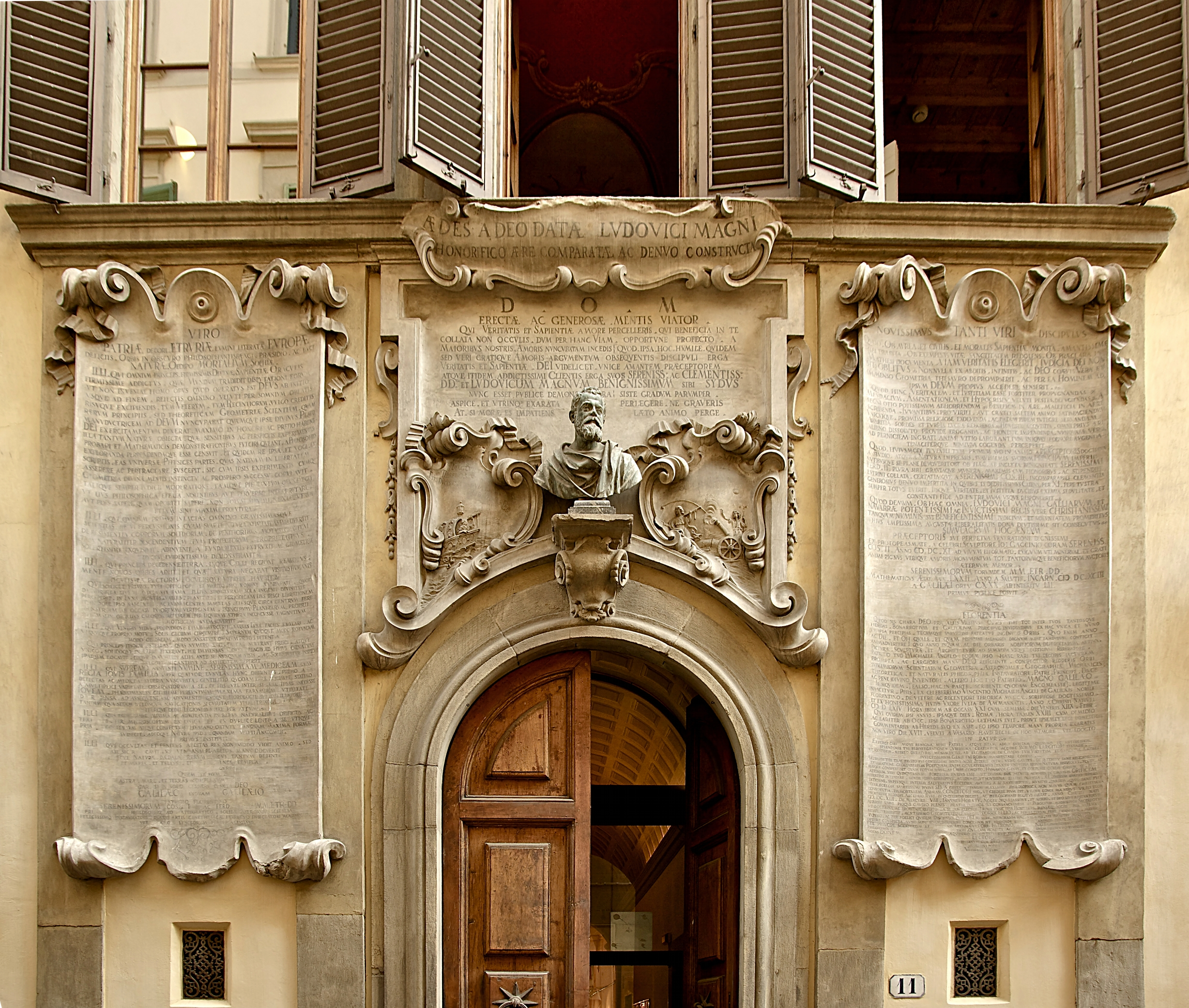
The "Palazzo Viviani" or "Palazzo dei Cartelloni" with plaques and bust dedicated by Viviani to Galilei

In Florence, Viviani had Galileo's life and achievements written in Latin on the façade of his palace, on huge stone scrolls. The palace was then renamed Palazzo dei Cartelloni.

== Works (selection) ==
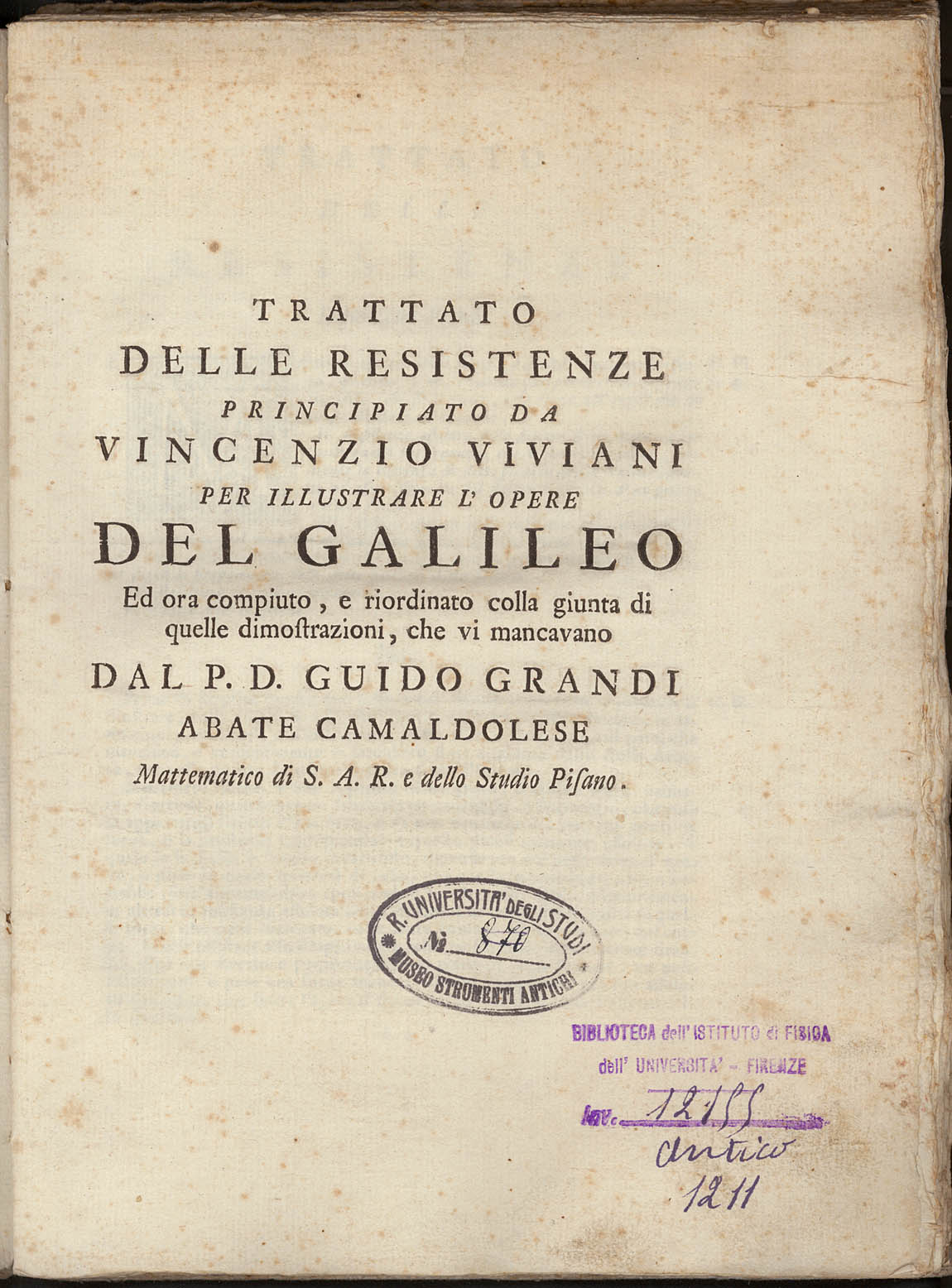
Trattato delle resistenze di Vincenzo Viviani completato da Guido Grandi, 1718

- Racconto istorico della vita di Galileo Galilei (Historical Account of the Life of Galileo Galilei) (composed in 1654, published in 1717); English translation, "Historical Account of the Life of Galileo Galilei", in On the Life of Galileo: Vincenzo Viviani's Historical Account and Other Early Biographies, edited, translated and annotated by Stefano Gattei, Princeton: Princeton University Press, 2019, pp. 1–93.
- "Relazione intorno al riparare per quanto possibile sia la città e campagne di Pisa dall'inondazioni" (April 12, 1684)
- Trattato delle resistenze (in Italian). Firenze: Giovanni Gaetano Tartini & Santi Franchi. 1718.

== See also ==
- Galileo's Leaning Tower of Pisa experiment
- Viviani's theorem
- Viviani's curve
