= Raffaello Magiotti =

Italian astronomer, mathematician and physicist

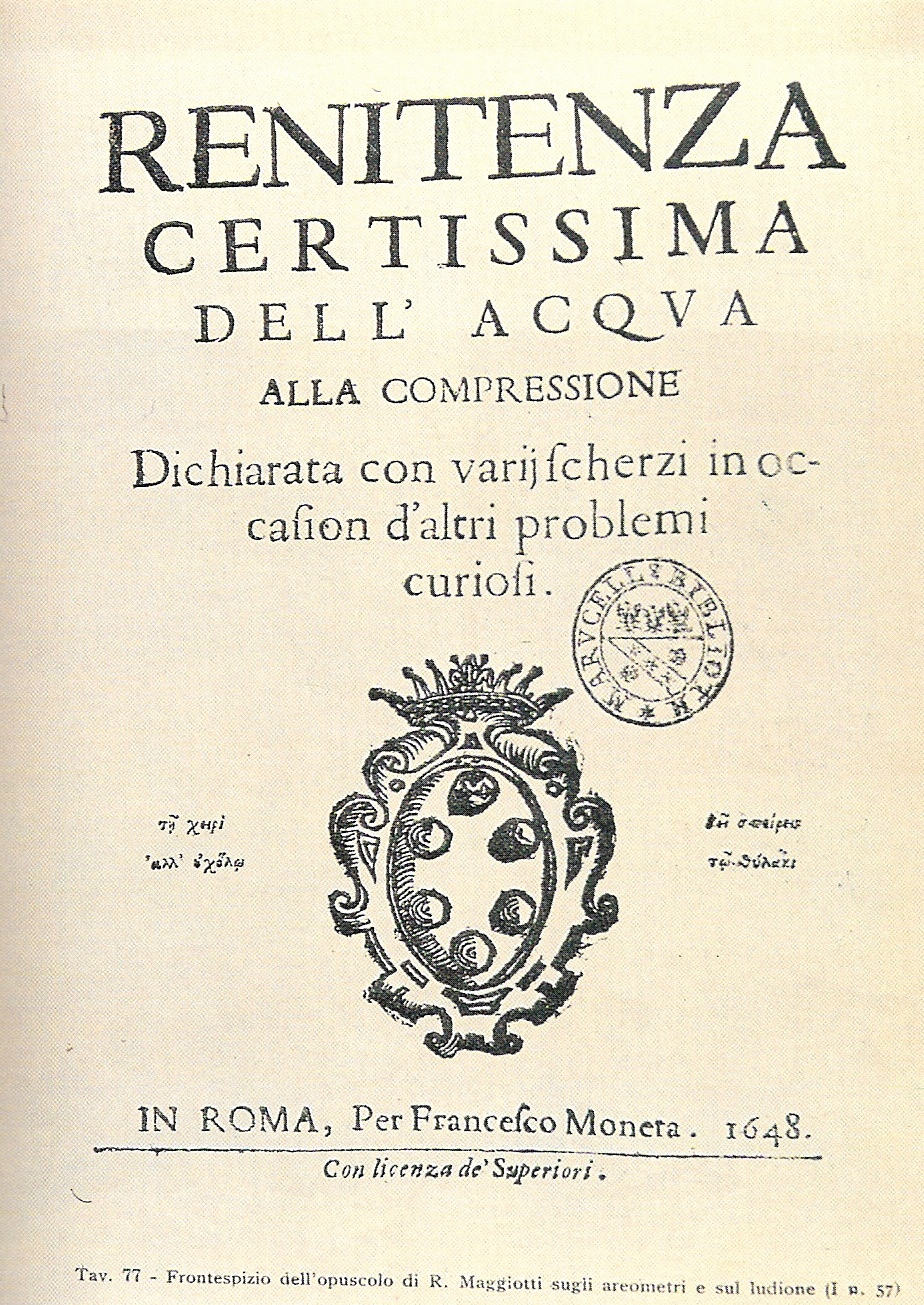
Water's Resistance to Compression

Raffaello Magiotti (1597–1656) was an Italian astronomer, mathematician and physicist.

== Biography ==
Born in Montevarchi, he studied at Florence, and, having taken his vows, moved to Rome, following Cardinal Sacchetti. In 1636, he began to work at the Vatican Library.

A pupil of Castelli in Rome, in 1638 he was Castelli's tip to Galileo as the candidate for the chair of Mathematics at Pisa. Well at home in the scientific community in the Papal city, Magiotti actively participated in Roman scientific debates, on which he provided detailed information to Galileo, with whom he was often in touch. During his life, Magiotti published only one work, entitled Renitenza dell’acqua alla compressione (Water's Resistance to Compression), which came out in 1648.

The text was the first report of the practical resistance to compression – which Magiotti mistakenly claimed to be absolute – of water at constant temperature, as well as the expansion and contraction of fluid media (water and air) subjected to changes in temperature. In addition to descriptions of various thermometers, the work also presents an illustration of bell-jar divers, or "Cartesian divers", which implies that they were discovered by Magiotti rather than by René Descartes.

Magiotti played a role in the context of experimentation which preceded, and to a large extent, prepared the way, for the torricellian barometric experiments. He assisted – giving full descriptions in various letters – in the syphon experiments performed by Gasparo Berti around 1640. In a letter to Mersenne from 1648, he recalled that happy experimental period, and revealed that he had told Torricelli about the tests performed by Berti. He also suggested the use of sea-water, which is more dense than fresh water, thus making possible the decisive choice of mercury in barometric experiments. He died of the plague in 1656 in Rome.
