= Fontana =

Fontana may refer to:

== Places ==
=== Italy ===
- Fontana Liri, comune in the Province of Frosinone
- Fontanafredda, comune in the Province of Pordenone
- Fontanarosa, comune in the Province of Avellino
- Francavilla Fontana, comune in the Province of Brindisi
- Serrara Fontana, comune in the Province of Napoli

=== Switzerland ===
- Fontana GR, a settlement in Tarasp in the Canton of Graubünden
- Fontana (Airolo), a settlement in Airolo, in the Canton of Ticino

=== United States ===
- Fontana, California
- Fontana, Kansas
- Fontana, Texas
- Fontana Village, North Carolina
- Fontana-on-Geneva Lake, Wisconsin
- Fontana Dam in the U.S. state of North Carolina

=== Elsewhere ===
- Fontana, Chaco, a settlement in San Fernando Department, Chaco Province, Argentina
- Fontana, Gozo, on Gozo Island, Republic of Malta
- Fontana (Belgrade), a neighborhood of Belgrade, Serbia
- Fontana (lunar crater), an impact crater on the Moon
- Fontana (Martian crater), an impact craters on Mars
- Fontana metro station, a rapid transit station in Barcelona, Catalonia, Spain
- Fontana station (California), a commuter rail station in Fontana, California, USA

== Other uses ==
- Fontana (surname)
- Fontana (Schooner), a schooner that was wrecked in the St. Clair River
- Fontana Books or Fontana Press, an imprint of HarperCollins
- Fontana Distribution, a record distribution company
- Fontana North, a Canadian record distribution company
- Fontana Records, a record label
- Fontana (drag queen), Brazilian-Swedish drag queen
- The House of Love (1990 album), album by the House of Love, also known as Fontana
