= Cavalieri's quadrature formula =

Mathematical term in calculus

Cavalieri's quadrature formula computes the area under the cubic curve, together with other higher powers.

In calculus, Cavalieri's quadrature formula, named for 17th-century Italian mathematician Bonaventura Cavalieri, is the integral

$$\int_0^a x^n\,dx = \tfrac{1}{n+1}\, a^{n+1} \qquad n \geq 0,$$

and generalizations thereof. This is the definite integral form; the indefinite integral form is:

$$\int x^n\,dx = \tfrac{1}{n+1}\, x^{n+1} + C \qquad n \neq -1.$$

There are additional forms, listed below. Together with the linearity of the integral, this formula allows one to compute the integrals of all polynomials.

The term "quadrature" is a traditional term for area; the integral is geometrically interpreted as the area under the curve y = x^{n}. Traditionally important cases are y = x^{2}, the quadrature of the parabola, known in antiquity, and y = 1/x, the quadrature of the hyperbola, whose value is a logarithm.

== Forms ==
=== Negative n ===
For negative values of n (negative powers of x), there is a singularity at x = 0, and thus the definite integral is based at 1, rather than 0, yielding:

$$\int_1^a x^n\,dx = \frac{1}{n+1} (a^{n+1} - 1) \qquad n \neq -1.$$

Further, for negative fractional (non-integer) values of n, the power x^{n} is not well-defined, hence the indefinite integral is only defined for positive x. However, for n a negative integer the power x^{n} is defined for all non-zero x, and the indefinite integrals and definite integrals are defined, and can be computed via a symmetry argument, replacing x by −x, and basing the negative definite integral at −1.

Over the complex numbers the definite integral (for negative values of n and x) can be defined via contour integration, but then depends on choice of path, specifically winding number – the geometric issue is that the function defines a covering space with a singularity at 0.

=== n = −1 ===
There is also the exceptional case n = −1, yielding a logarithm instead of a power of x:

$$\int_1^a \frac{1}{x}\,dx = \ln a,$$
$$\int \frac{1}{x}\,dx = \ln x + C, \qquad x > 0$$

(where "ln" means the natural logarithm, i.e. the logarithm to the base e = 2.71828...).

The improper integral is often extended to negative values of x via the conventional choice:

$$\int \frac{1}{x}\,dx = \ln |x| + C, \qquad x \neq 0.$$

Note the use of the absolute value in the indefinite integral; this is to provide a unified form for the integral, and means that the integral of this odd function is an even function, though the logarithm is only defined for positive inputs, and in fact, different constant values of C can be chosen on either side of 0, since these do not change the derivative. The more general form is thus:

$$\int\frac{1}{x} \, dx= \begin{cases}
\ln |x| + C^- & x < 0 \\
\ln |x| + C^+ & x > 0
\end{cases}$$

Over the complex numbers there is not a global antiderivative for 1/x, due this function defining a non-trivial covering space; this form is special to the real numbers.

Note that the definite integral starting from 1 is not defined for negative values of a, since it passes through a singularity, though since 1/x is an odd function, one can base the definite integral for negative powers at −1. If one is willing to use improper integrals and compute the Cauchy principal value, one obtains $\int_{-c}^c \frac{1}{x}\,dx = 0,$ which can also be argued by symmetry (since the logarithm is odd), so $\int_{-1}^1 \frac{1}{x}\,dx = 0,$ so it makes no difference if the definite integral is based at 1 or −1. As with the indefinite integral, this is special to the real numbers, and does not extend over the complex numbers.

=== Alternative forms ===
The integral can also be written with indexes shifted, which simplify the result and make the relation to n-dimensional differentiation and the n-cube clearer:

$$\int_0^a x^{n-1}\,dx = \tfrac{1}{n} a^n \qquad n \geq 1.$$
$$\int x^{n-1}\,dx = \tfrac{1}{n} x^n + C \qquad n \neq 0.$$

More generally, these formulae may be given as:

$$\int (ax + b)^n dx= \frac{(ax + b)^{n+1}}{a(n + 1)} + C \qquad\mbox{(for } n\neq -1\mbox{)}\,\!$$
$$\int\frac{1}{ax + b} dx= \frac{1}{a}\ln\left|ax + b\right| + C$$
More generally:

$$\int\frac{1}{ax + b} \, dx= \begin{cases}
\frac{1}{a}\ln\left|ax + b\right| + C^- & x < -b/a \\
\frac{1}{a}\ln\left|ax + b\right| + C^+ & x > -b/a
\end{cases}$$

== Proof ==
The modern proof is to use an antiderivative: the derivative of x^{n} is shown to be nx^{n−1} – for non-negative integers. This is shown from the binomial formula and the definition of the derivative – and thus by the fundamental theorem of calculus the antiderivative is the integral. This method fails for $\int \frac{1}{x}\,dx,$ as the candidate antiderivative is $\frac{1}{0} \cdot x^0$, which is undefined due to division by zero. The logarithm function, which is the actual antiderivative of 1/x, must be introduced and examined separately.

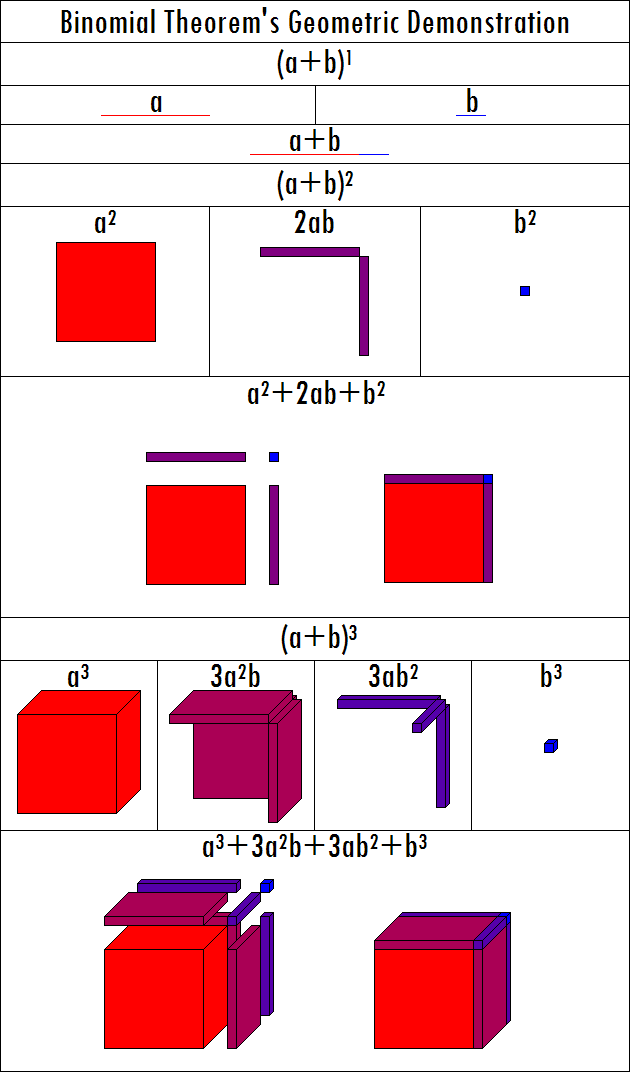
The derivative $(x^n)'=nx^{n-1}$ can be geometrized as the infinitesimal change in volume of the n-cube, which is the area of n faces, each of dimension n − 1. Integrating this picture – stacking the faces – geometrizes the fundamental theorem of calculus, yielding a decomposition of the n-cube into n pyramids, which is a geometric proof of Cavalieri's quadrature formula.

For positive integers, this proof can be geometrized: if one considers the quantity x^{n} as the volume of the n-cube (the hypercube in n dimensions), then the derivative is the change in the volume as the side length is changed – this is x^{n−1}, which can be interpreted as the area of n faces, each of dimension n − 1 (fixing one vertex at the origin, these are the n faces not touching the vertex), corresponding to the cube increasing in size by growing in the direction of these faces – in the 3-dimensional case, adding 3 infinitesimally thin squares, one to each of these faces. Conversely, geometrizing the fundamental theorem of calculus, stacking up these infinitesimal (n − 1) cubes yields a (hyper)-pyramid, and n of these pyramids form the n-cube, which yields the formula. Further, there is an n-fold cyclic symmetry of the n-cube around the diagonal cycling these pyramids (for which a pyramid is a fundamental domain). In the case of the cube (3-cube), this is how the volume of a pyramid was originally rigorously established: the cube has 3-fold symmetry, with fundamental domain a pyramids, dividing the cube into 3 pyramids, corresponding to the fact that the volume of a pyramid is one third of the base times the height. This illustrates geometrically the equivalence between the quadrature of the parabola and the volume of a pyramid, which were computed classically by different means.

Alternative proofs exist – for example, Fermat computed the area via an algebraic trick of dividing the domain into certain intervals of unequal length; alternatively, one can prove this by recognizing a symmetry of the graph y = x^{n} under inhomogeneous dilation (by d in the x direction and d^{n} in the y direction, algebraicizing the n dimensions of the y direction), or deriving the formula for all integer values by expanding the result for n = −1 and comparing coefficients.

== History ==
Archimedes computed the area of parabolic segments in his The Quadrature of the Parabola.

A detailed discussion of the history, with original sources, is given in (Laubenbacher & Pengelley 1998, Chapter 3, Analysis: Calculating Areas and Volumes); see also history of calculus and history of integration.

The case of the parabola was proven in antiquity by the ancient Greek mathematician Archimedes in his The Quadrature of the Parabola (3rd century BC), via the method of exhaustion. Of note is that Archimedes computed the area inside a parabola – a so-called "parabolic segment" – rather than the area under the graph y = x^{2}, which is instead the perspective of Cartesian geometry. These are equivalent computations, but reflect a difference in perspective. The Ancient Greeks, among others, also computed the volume of a pyramid or cone, which is mathematically equivalent.

In the 11th century, the Islamic mathematician Ibn al-Haytham (known as Alhazen in Europe) computed the integrals of cubics and quartics (degree three and four) via mathematical induction, in his Book of Optics.

The case of higher integers was computed by Cavalieri for n up to 9, using his method of indivisibles (Cavalieri's principle). He interpreted these as higher integrals as computing higher-dimensional volumes, though only informally, as higher-dimensional objects were as yet unfamiliar. This method of quadrature was then extended by Italian mathematician Evangelista Torricelli to other curves such as the cycloid, then the formula was generalized to fractional and negative powers by English mathematician John Wallis, in his Arithmetica Infinitorum (1656), which also standardized the notion and notation of rational powers – though Wallis incorrectly interpreted the exceptional case n = −1 (quadrature of the hyperbola) – before finally being put on rigorous ground with the development of integral calculus.

Prior to Wallis's formalization of fractional and negative powers, which allowed explicit functions $y=x^{p/q},$ these curves were handled implicitly, via the equations $x^p=ky^q$ and $x^py^q=k$ (p and q always positive integers) and referred to respectively as higher parabolae and higher hyperbolae (or "higher parabolas" and "higher hyperbolas"). Pierre de Fermat also computed these areas (except for the exceptional case of −1) by an algebraic trick – he computed the quadrature of the higher hyperbolae via dividing the line into equal intervals, and then computed the quadrature of the higher parabolae by using a division into unequal intervals, presumably by inverting the divisions he used for hyperbolae. However, as in the rest of his work, Fermat's techniques were more ad hoc tricks than systematic treatments, and he is not considered to have played a significant part in the subsequent development of calculus.

Of note is that Cavalieri only compared areas to areas and volumes to volumes – these always having dimensions, while the notion of considering an area as consisting of units of area (relative to a standard unit), hence being unitless, appears to have originated with Wallis; Wallis studied fractional and negative powers, and the alternative to treating the computed values as unitless numbers was to interpret fractional and negative dimensions.

The exceptional case of −1 (the standard hyperbola) was first successfully treated by Grégoire de Saint-Vincent in his Opus geometricum quadrature circuli et sectionum coni (1647), though a formal treatment had to wait for the development of the natural logarithm, which was accomplished by Nicholas Mercator in his Logarithmotechnia (1668).
