= Thermoscope =

Device that shows changes in temperature

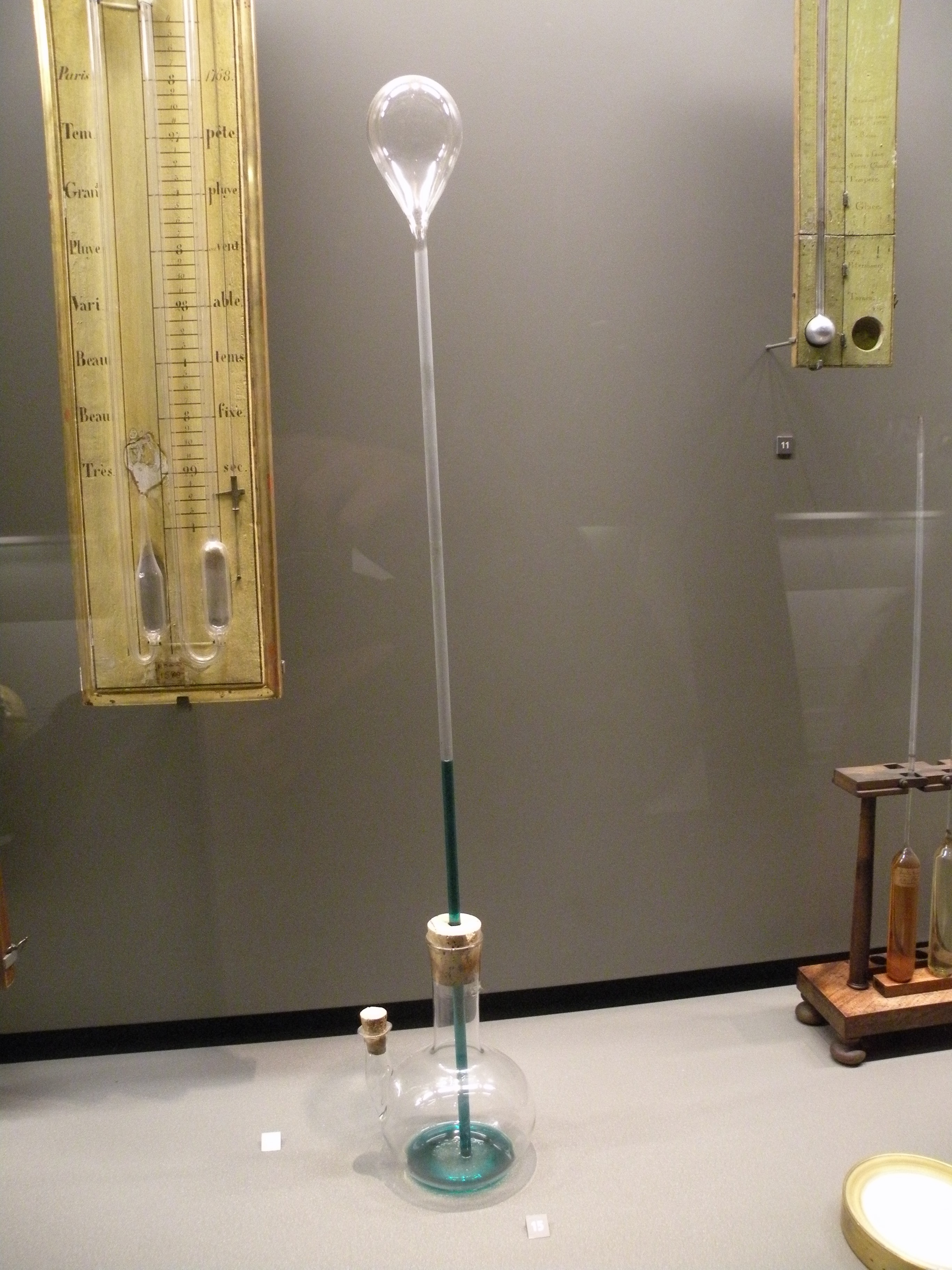
Galileo thermoscope, The Musée des Arts et Métiers, Paris

A thermoscope is a device that shows changes in temperature. A typical design is a tube in which a liquid rises and falls as the temperature changes. The modern thermometer gradually evolved from it with the addition of a scale in the early 17th century and standardisation throughout the 17th and 18th centuries.

== Function ==
Principle of a thermoscope. The air in the bulb expands at higher temperatures, which lowers the liquid level in the tube.

Devices employing both heat and pressure were common during Galileo's time, used for fountains, nursing, or bleeding in medicine. The device was built from a small vase filled with water, attached to a thin vertically rising pipe, with a large empty glass ball at the top. Changes in temperature of the upper ball would exert positive or negative pressure on the water below, causing it to rise or lower in the thin column. The device established fixed points but does not measure specific quantity, although it can tell when something is warmer than another thing.

Essentially, thermoscopes served as a justification of sorts regarding what is observed or experienced by the senses – that the device's basic agreement with the indications of the senses generates initial confidence in its reliability.

Large thermoscopes placed outdoors appeared to cause perpetual motion of contained water, and these were therefore sometimes called perpetuum mobile. Galileo's own work with the thermoscope led him to develop an essentially atomistic conception of heat, published in his book Il Saggiatore in 1623.

== History ==
Philo of Byzantium is credited with the construction of the first thermoscope (or Philo thermometer), an early version of the thermometer. It is also thought, but not certain, that Galileo Galilei discovered the specific principle on which the device is based and built the first thermoscope in 1593. In the 17th century Galileo mentioned to his friend Cesare Marsili that he invented a thermoscope as far back as 1606. The inventor could be his physician friend Santorio Santorio or another person of the learned circle in Venice of which they were members. What is certain is that the thermoscope had started circulating in market squares during Galileo's time. The development of the actual device is attributed to four inventors; namely: Galileo, Santorio Santorio, Robert Fludd, and Cornelius Drebbel. However, the general pneumatic principle of the thermoscope was used in the Hellenic period, and it was written about even earlier, by Empedocles of Agrigentum in his 460 B.C. book On Nature.

Santorio Santorio wrote a Commentary on the Medical Art of Galen in 1612 that described the device in print. Shortly afterward, in 1617 Giuseppe Biancani published the first clear diagram. The device at this time could not be used for quantitative or standardized measurement and used the temperature of air to expand or contract gas, thereby moving a column of water. It was Drebbel who announced in the early 17th century one of the earliest or possibly the first prototype, which was filled with air and blocked by water containing a little aqua fortis to prevent it from freezing and being discolored.

The device was improved by early German scientist Otto von Guericke in the 17th century. Ferdinando II de' Medici, Grand Duke of Tuscany personally made a further improvement by introducing the use of a colored alcohol, so that the material responding to heat was now liquid instead of gas.

It is possible that Francesco Sagredo or Santorio may have added some kind of scales to thermoscopes, and Robert Fludd may have accomplished something similar in 1638. In 1701 Ole Christensen Rømer effectively invented the thermometer by adding a temperature scale (see Rømer scale) to the thermoscope.

== See also ==
- Galileo thermometer
- Tasimeter
