= Bartolomeo Sovero =

Swiss mathematician

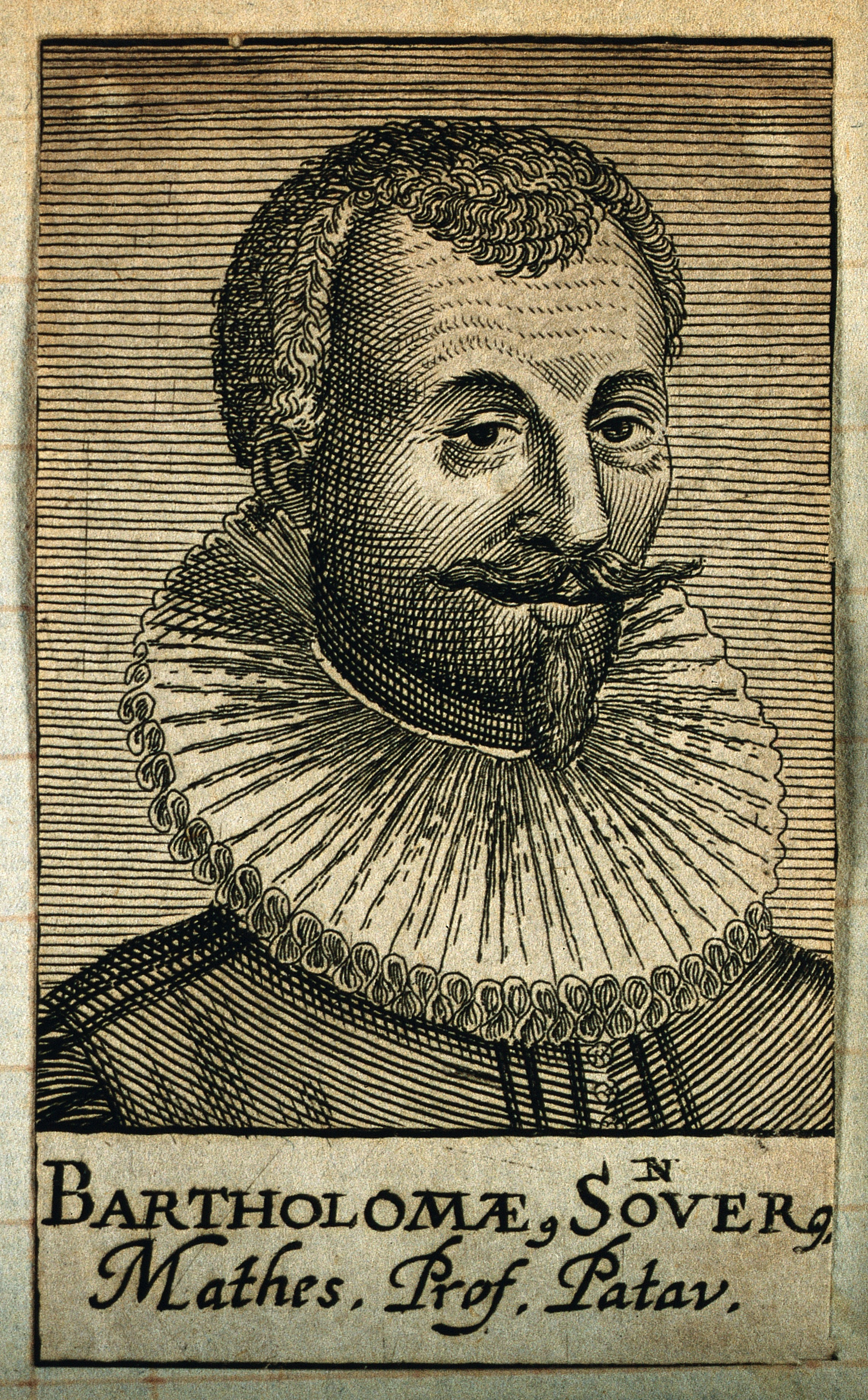
- Born: Barthélemy Souvey; 1576; Corbières, Switzerland
- Died: 23 July 1629 (aged 52–53); Padua, Republic of Venice
- Employer: University of Padua
- Notable work: Curvi ac recti proportio
- Scientific career
- Fields: mathematics

Bartolomeo Sovero (1576 – 23 July 1629) was a Swiss mathematician.

== Biography ==
Sovero was born in Corbières in 1576. In 1594 he entered the Jesuit order and studied logic, mathematics and theology at the Jesuit College of Brera. In 1604 he left the Society of Jesus. in 1624 Sovero replaced Giovanni Camillo Glorioso on the chair of mathematics at the University of Padua. In his main work, Curvi ac recti proportio, Sovero proves to be a precursor of the geometry of indivisibles and of the method called "proportional parallel movement". It is elucidated by an algebraic formulation. The work of Sovero gave rise to two important polemics, one with the first successor of Galileo in Padua, Glorioso; the second between Guldin and Cavalieri on the subject of the latter's originality.

== Works ==
- Sovero, Bartolomeo (1630). Curvi ac recti proportio. Patavii: Varisco Varisco.

== Bibliography ==
- Busulini, Bruno (1957–1958). "Le figure analoghe di Bartolomeo Sovero". Atti e Memorie dell'Accademia Patavina di Scienze, Lettere ed Arti. LXX (2): 35–88.
- Nenci, Elio (2019). "SOVERO, Bartolomeo". Dizionario Biografico degli Italiani (in Italian). Vol. 93: Sisto V–Stammati. Rome: Istituto dell'Enciclopedia Italiana. ISBN 978-88-12-00032-6.
