= Scipione Chiaramonti =

Italian philosopher (1565–1652)

- Born: 21 June 1565; Cesena, Papal States
- Died: 3 October 1652 (aged 87); Cesena, Papal States
- Alma mater: University of Ferrara
- Occupation: Astronomer, philosopher, mathematician
- Employer: University of Pisa

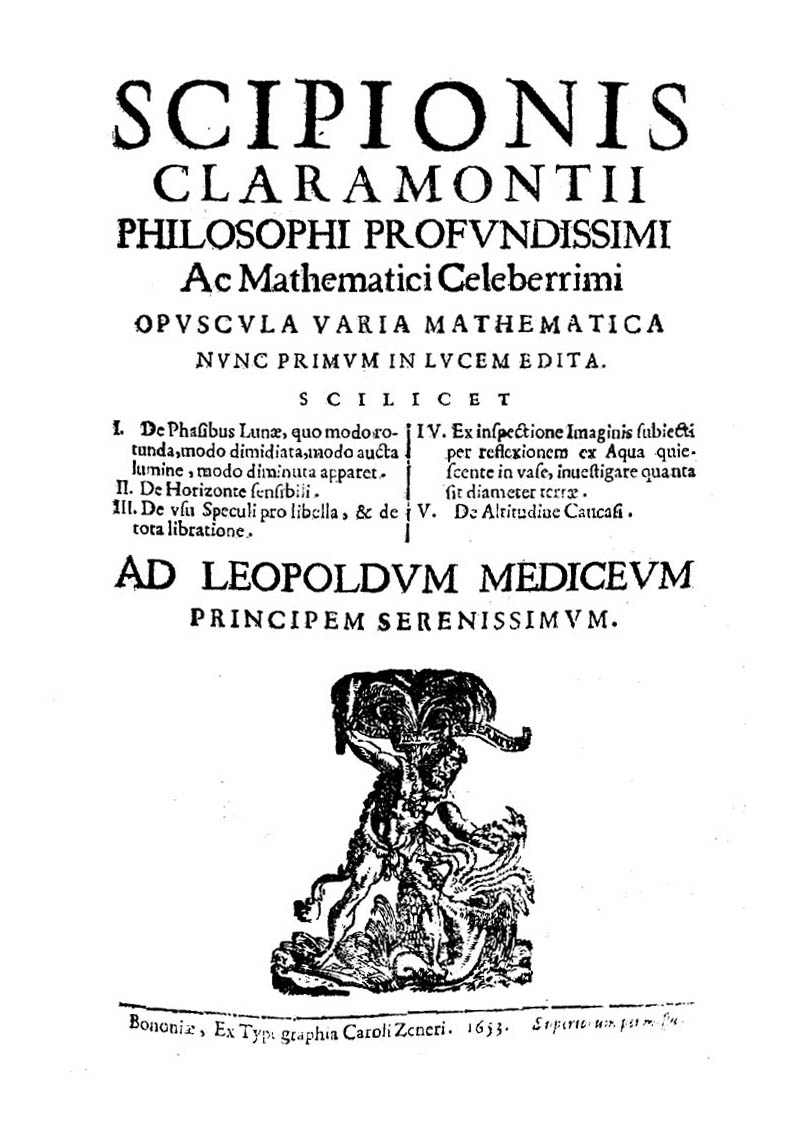
Opuscula varia mathematica, 1653

Scipione Chiaramonti (21 June 1565 – 3 October 1652) was an Italian philosopher and noted opponent of Galileo.

== Early life ==
The Chiaramonti family was noble and wealthy, claiming to have originated in Clermont and moved to Italy in the fourteenth century. Pope Pius VII (1742–1823) was from the same family. The son of a doctor, Scipione studied at the University of Ferrara, lodging first at the house of Cardinal Alessandro d’Este and later associating with the circle of Cardinal Curzio Sangiorgi. In 1588 he married Virginia Abbati, with whom he was to father twelve children (including at least seven boys). A scholar of many interests, with a solid knowledge of medieval and humanistic natural philosophy, Chiaramonti organised a "Lyceum" at his house, in which he taught mathematics, optics and perspective. The art theorist Matteo Zaccolini was among his disciples. In 1592 he met Galileo, passing through Cesena on his way to Pesaro, who described him as 'very gifted in mathematics'; the same year he graduated in philosophy.

He spent a short period in Faenza where, in 1598 he wrote a treatise on mathematical problems in artillery; in 1601, he was hired, at annual salary of 340 scudi, as "interpreter of natural philosophy to the academy of Perugia" and also received an annual allowance of 400 ducats from Cardinal Alessandro d'Este. He was highly regarded by the Cardinal's half-brother, Cesare d'Este, Duke of Modena whom he served as mathematician and advisor, and who took two of his sons, Virginio and Niccolò, as his pages. He was for a time also in the service of Cardinal Cinzio Passeri Aldobrandini. Some time between 1610 and 1614 he composed a treatise on stage scenery.

== Opposition to Tycho Brahe ==
In 1618 three comets appeared over Europe, and Chiaromonti dedicated his first printed work, Discorso della cometa pogonare dell'anno MDCXVIII to Cesare d'Este. He thus entered into a scientific polemic on the nature of comets that involved Orazio Grassi and Galileo; while Galileo held that they were most likely optical illusions rather than heavenly bodies, Chiaramonti argued that comets were made of 'elemental substance', did display parallax and were definitely sublunar.

Just as Galileo sought to interpret the phenomenon of comets in a way which supported Copernican heliocentrism, Chiaramonti explained it with the intention of supporting the traditional geocentric model. Chiaramonti was such a determined defender of classical astronomy that he rejected even the Tychonic system, which was by then commonly accepted among Jesuit scholars and other astronomers who did not agree with the views of Copernicus. Chiaramonti's second and more significant venture into this scholarly field came with his 1621 work Antitycho which opposed the argument of Tycho Brahe that comets were celestial bodies following an orbit above the Moon. In this work Chiaramonti tackled not only Tycho but Grassi, devoting 10 of the work's 65 chapters to refuting his arguments about comets. When Johannes Kepler received a copy of Antitycho, he replied with Shieldbearer for Tycho.

Despite the fundamental difference of views with Chiaramonti, Galileo maintained cordial relations with him at this time, referring to him positively in The Assayer as having conclusively proved the falsity of Tycho's model of the universe. Galileo's views may have hardened after Chiaramonti replied to Kepler's Shieldbearer in 1626 with his Apologia pro Antitychone. In this he reiterated what Benedetto Castelli described as "ridiculous and impossible" opinions on comets and stars. Mario Guiducci scorned him as a "cold, insipid Peripatetic" who needed "a good ironing."

In contrast, Chiaramonti's standing in Church circles continued to rise, and he served as a consultant to the Holy Office in Cesena. Many conservative churchmen in Rome were convinced that they had found in him the champion who would overcome dangerous innovations and restore traditional certainties. As Guiducci reported to Galileo, some believed that Chiaramonti would prove able to resolve the question of the earth's movement in favour of Ptolemy. The poet Pier Francesco Minozzi praised him in verse as ‘the Aristotle of our times.’

== 'Enemy of Astronomers' ==
In 1627 Chiaramonti was elected to the chair in philosophy at the University of Pisa with an annual salary of 700 ducats, where he remained until 1636. In 1629 he applied to the more prestigious university of Bologna to teach mathematics, but his appointment was blocked, with particularly strong opposition from Galileo's friend Cesare Marsili, who described him as "such an enemy of astronomers" ("tanto nemico degli astronomi"). In 1628 Chiaramonti published another attack on both Tycho and Copernicus, De Tribus Novis Stellis. This was concerned with three transient 'new stars' in 1572, 1600 and 1604. His purpose was to refute arguments that these were actual stars rather than sublunary events.

The publication of Galileo's Dialogue Concerning the Two Chief World Systems in Italian in 1632 and then in Latin in 1635, dealt a serious blow to Chiaramonti's scientific credibility. In the dialogue, arguments that he had used in past were placed in the mouth of Galileo's idiot character Simplicius in such way that, as Chiaramonti himself commented, only a "scempio" ("disgrace", "total mess") like Simplicio could possibly believe them. The character of Salivati firmly rebuts these points, dismissing "Antitycho" as a work hardly meriting serious attention, and referring to existence of sunspots, which not only darken the surface of the Sun, but cast a shadow on the whole of peripatetic philosophy. Chiaramonti is explicitly named in the "Dialogue", and Salviati says that as he is not present to answer his questions, he invites Simplicio to respond in his place. Simplicio does so, quoting verbatim from Chiaramonti's De Tribus Novis Stellis.

Chiaramonti responded to Galileo almost at once with a dialogue of his own, the Difesa di Scipione Chiaramonti da Cesena al suo Antiticone (1633). In this he argued a position that "is neither well presented [i.e. by Salviati to Simplicio].... nor is it answered by him." Chiaramonti rewrote this entire section of Galileo's Dialogue, challenging Galileo's logic and inserting responses in the Salviati-Simplicio conversation to indicate what he would have said in place of Simplicio's weak replies. Galileo's supporters were scathing about this book, but Galileo was unable to respond to it publicly. In October 1632 he had been summoned to Rome for questioning by the Inquisition following the publication of his "Dialogue" and in April 1633 his trial began. One of his judges was Cardinal Francesco Barberini, nephew of the Pope, and Grand Inquisitor, to whom Chiaramonti had dedicated his Difesa. In a letter to Élie Diodati on 25 July 1634 Galileo complained that in the Difesa, Chiaramonti had allowed himself to be drawn into writing 'exaggerated' and 'reckless' things which, outside of present circumstances, could easily have been refuted.

== Later disputes ==
In 1635 Chiaramonti published a work of political philosophy, Della Ragion di Stato which examined at great length different possible definitions of the terms 'reason' and 'state' and considered the dilemmas of statecraft and morality. The following year he left his position at Pisa, was unsuccessful in soliciting a chair at the University of Padua (which he wanted to secure without competition and with a salary of more than 600 sequins), and retired to Cesena. Here he devoted much of his time to an 887-page history of his native city, Caesenae historia, which was published in 1641.

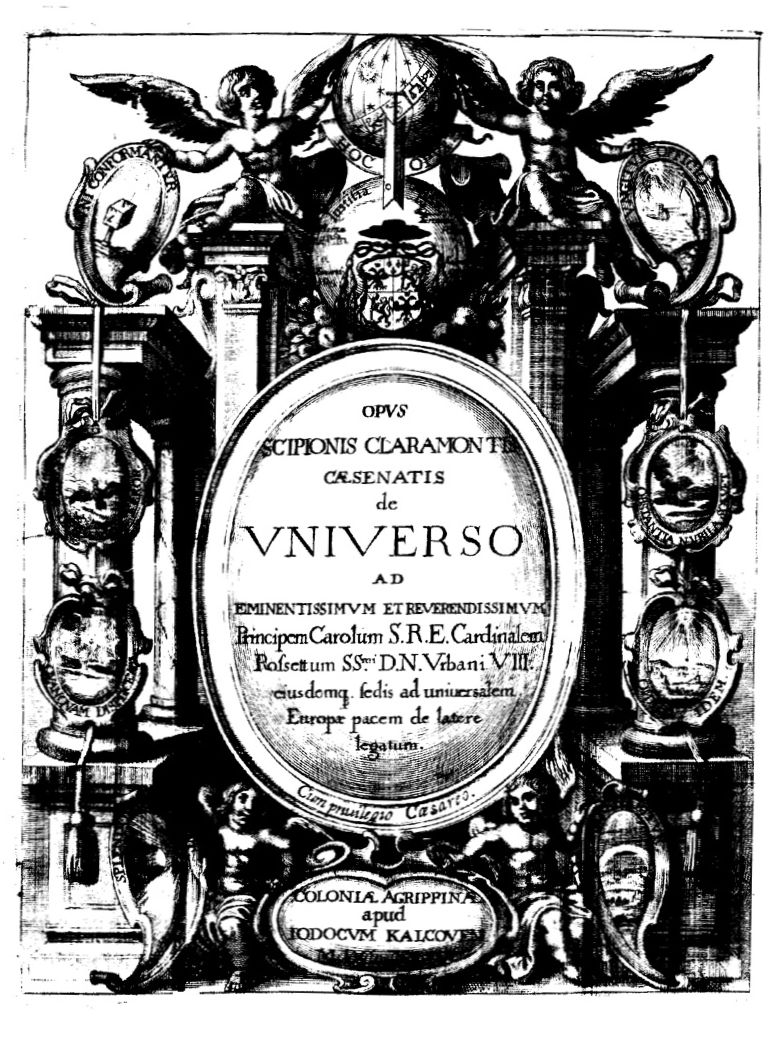
De universo, 1644

The remainder of his attention returned to the territory of scholarly disputes; Giovanni Camillo Glorioso had criticised his De Tribus and in 1636 Charamonti published a refutation, Examen censurae Gloriosi, to which Glorioso replied the following year Castigatio examinis. To this Chiaramonti responded in turn with Castigatio Ioannis Camilli Gloriosi aduersus Scipionem Claramontium Caesenatem (1638). Glorioso's final contribution to this dispute was his Responsio (1641). As he died soon after, this allowed Chiaramonti the last word, which he took with a volume of more than 500 pages, summarising his Aristotelian positions on a wide range of topics, his Opus Scipionis Claramontis Caesenatis de Universo (1644). No less acrimonious was his dispute with Galileo's friend Fortunio Liceti, founded on the same wish to defend Aristotle against any modern observation or experiment. This polemic was opened by Chiaramonti in 1636 and was fought by exchange of pamphlets until 1648. While pursuing these extended arguments, Chiaramonti produced a number of systematic treatises which reaffirmed classical Aristotelian thinking, and in 1643, the year after Galileo's death, he published an attack on his views in Antiphilolaus.

== Later life ==
Chiaramonti's wife died in 1644; there is an account that at the age of eighty he remarried to a much younger wife, but the consensus is that soon after he widowed, he joined the Capuchin order to which four of his sons already belonged, and erected at his own expense a church dedicated to Saint Philip and Saint Cecilia. He died in Cesena on 3 October 1652.

== Works ==
- Discorso della cometa pogonare dell'anno MDCXVIII (in Italian). Venezia: Pietro Farri. 1619.
- De tribus novis stellis quae annis 1572, 1600, 1604 comparuere (in Latin). Cesena: Giuseppe Neri. 1628.
- Difesa di Scipione Chiaramonti da Cesena al suo Antiticone, e Libro delle tre nuove Stelle (in Italian). Firenze: Landini. 1633.
- De universo (in Latin). Köln: Jost Kalckhoven. 1644.
- De sede cometarum et novorum phaenomenorum (in Latin). Forlì: Cimatti. 1648.
- Opuscula varia mathematica (in Latin). Bologna: Caroli Zeneri. 1653.
- In Aristotelem de iride, de corona, de pareliis, et virgis commentaria (in Latin). Venezia: Scipione Banca. 1668.
- In quartum metheorum commentaria (in Latin). Venezia: Scipione Banca. 1668.
