= Jimmy Fontana =

Italian actor, composer and singer-songwriter (1934–2013)

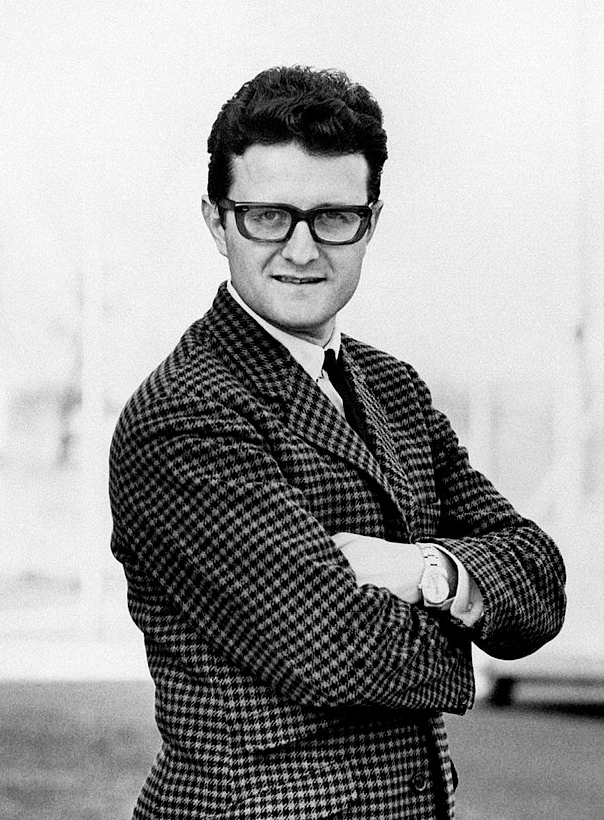
- Fontana in the 1960s
- Born: Enrico Sbriccoli; 13 November 1934; Camerino, Kingdom of Italy
- Died: 11 September 2013 (aged 78); Rome, Italy
- Occupations: Singer; music composer; actor
- Height: 1.75 m (5 ft 9 in)

Enrico Sbriccoli (13 November 1934 – 11 September 2013), known professionally as Jimmy Fontana, was an Italian actor, composer and singer-songwriter. Two of his most famous songs are "Che sarà", performed also by José Feliciano with Ricchi e Poveri, and "Il mondo".

== Biography ==
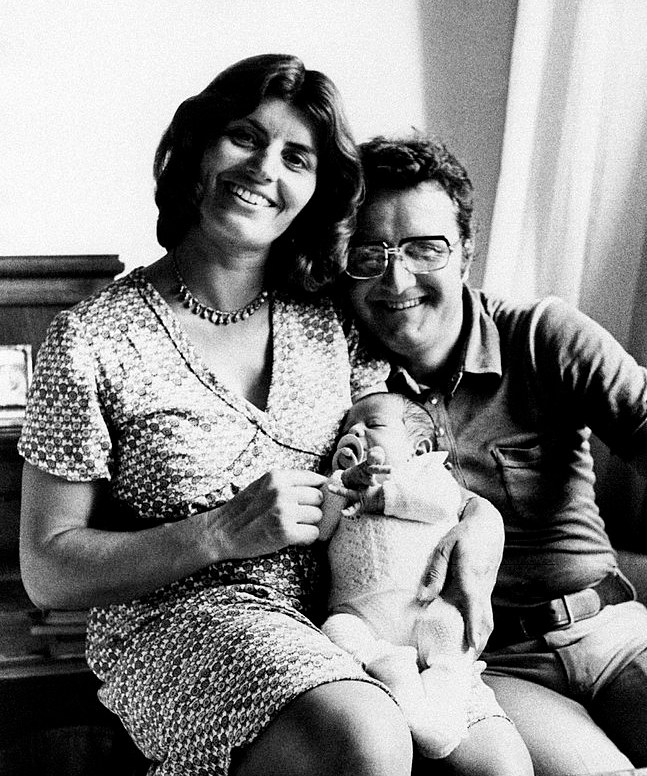
Fontana with wife Leda and son Roberto in Treia, Italy, ca.1970

Enrico Sbriccoli was born in Camerino, Marche. After graduating from high school, he moved to Rome to study Economics. In his spare time, Fontana taught himself bass and attended local jazz venues. Eventually, he dedicated himself completely to music and adopted the stage name Jimmy Fontana in homage to one of his heroes, American musician Jimmy Giuffre (the surname Fontana was arbitrarily chosen out of the phone book).

In the early 1950s, he started his own jazz band, Fontana and his Trio, with piano, bass and drums, and around that time he met Leda, who became his wife and with whom they had four children: Luigi, Roberto, Andrea, and Paola.

At the end of the 1950s, he turned to light music and began his solo career. His first success was "Diavolo" ("Devil"), which won him third place in the Festival of Barcelona. With his song "Bevo" ("I Drink"), in 1960, he won the Burlamacco Gold, a music competition in Viareggio. His first participation in the Sanremo Music Festival came in 1961 with "Lady luna" ("Lady moon"), written by Armando Trovajoli and Dino Verde. His first single with RCA is "Non te ne andare" ("Don't go"), released in 1963 and written by Gianni Meccia and Lilli Greco.

In 1965, Fontana had his major success with "Il mondo" ("The world"), a song composed by Fontana and Carlo Pes, and arranged by Ennio Morricone, with lyrics by Gianni Meccia, which reached the top of the charts in Italy and other countries in Europe and charted in Latin America as well. The same year, he made his debut as an actor, appearing in two musicarelli, which are movies heavily featuring musical numbers, titled Viale della canzone ("Avenue of song") and 008 Operazione ritmo ("008 Operation rhythm").

Jimmy Fontana's hits include "La mia serenata" which won the Un disco per l'estate festival in 1967.

At the 1968 Cantagiro summer festival, Fontana sang a cover version of the Tom Jones hit "Delilah", titled "La nostra favola". The song reached 2nd place in the Italian hit parade.

In 1971, the song "Che sarà", composed by Fontana with lyrics by Franco Migliacci, was performed by José Feliciano with the Ricchi e Poveri group at that year's Sanremo Music Festival, winning 2nd prize. It eventually became one of the biggest pop music hits of the era in Italy and abroad.

After "Che sarà", Fontana stopped writing songs, but continued to tour around Italy for another decade. In 1982 his son Luigi wrote the first part of the music for a new song and this fact brought Jimmy back to compose and create again: he completed the song "Beguine" and sang it at 1982 Sanremo Music Festival, joining the 6th place; Luigi was on stage with his father in Sanremo and from that moment on they were performing together around Italy and abroad until Jimmy died. They were joined in 1992 by Andrea (Jimmy's 3rd son), creating some beautiful and emotional "family shows". Fontana also continued appearing on TV shows until his old age. He died peacefully at his home in Rome, at age 78, while still planning concert tours.

== Discography ==
=== Albums ===
- Arrivederci (1996)
- Il Mondo (1997)
- I Grandi Successi Originali (2001)

== Filmography ==
=== Actor ===
- Il Sole è di tutti (1968)
- Quando dico che ti amo (1968)
- Viale della canzone (1965)
- Canzoni in bikini (1963)
- La voglia matta (1962)
- Io bacio, tu baci (1961)

=== Soundtrack composer ===
- The Three Fantastic Supermen (1967)
- Le belle famiglie (1964: "Caro amore mio")
- Io bacio, tu baci (1961: "Diavolo")

=== Soundtrack singer ===
- Io bacio, tu baci (1961: "Diavolo"; "Il tempo si è fermato"; "Mare di dicembre"; "Cha cha cha dell'impiccato")
