= Giovanni Camillo Glorioso =

Italian mathematician and astronomer

Doctor Giovanni Camillo Glorioso
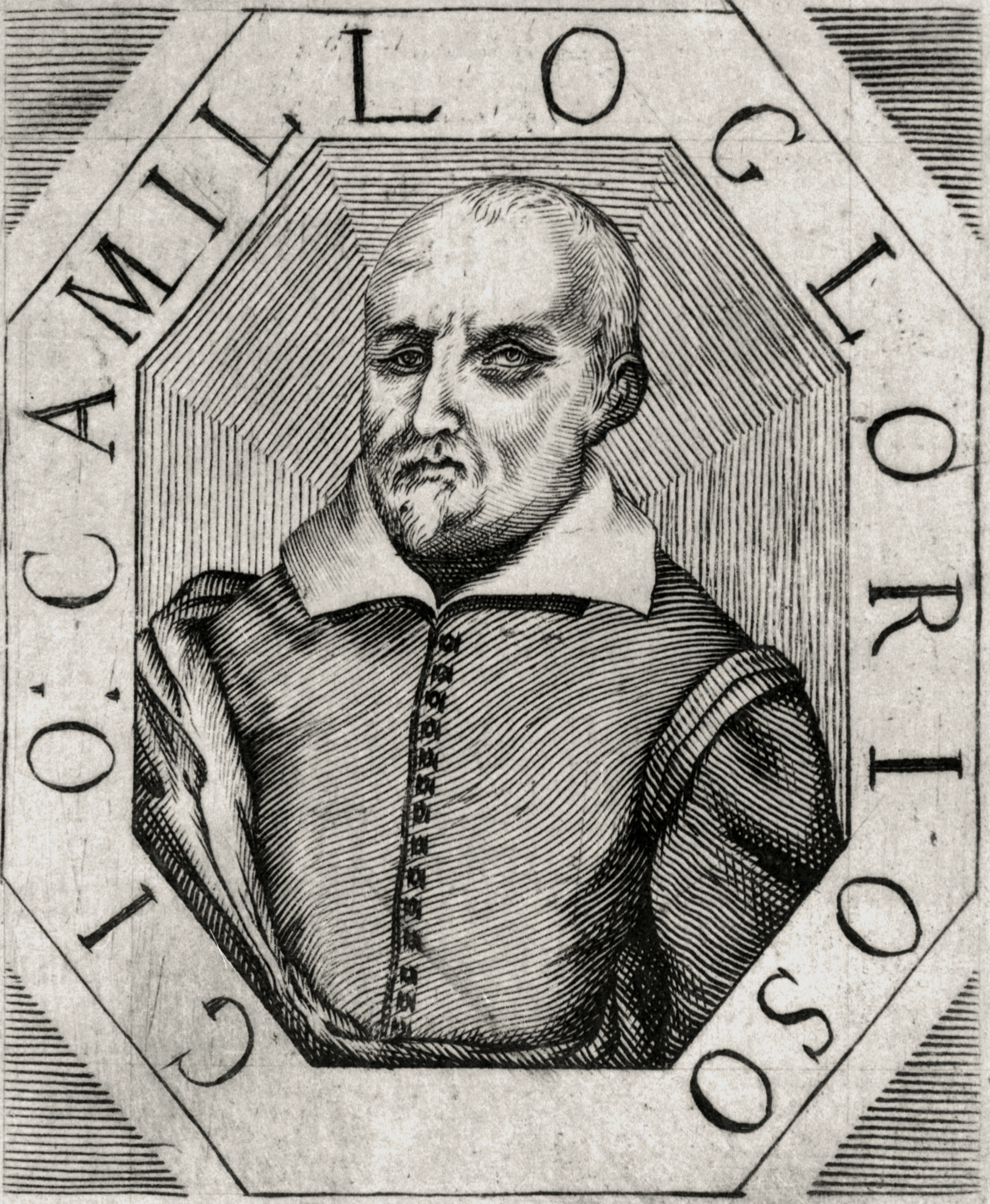
- Engraved portrait of Giovanni Camillo Glorioso from Lorenzo Crasso's Elogii d'huomini letterati, Venice, Combi & La Noù, 1666
- Born: 1572; Montecorvino Rovella, Kingdom of Naples
- Died: 8 January 1643 (aged 70–71); Naples, Kingdom of Naples
- Other name: C. Mallius Eudoxus
- Occupations: mathematician, physicist, astronomer

Academic background
- Education: University of Naples Federico II
- Influences: Clavius; Viète; Stevin; Galilei; Ghetaldi; Schreck

Academic work
- Discipline: Mathematician, physician, astronomer
- Institutions: University of Padua
- Notable students: Giovanni Francesco Sagredo
- Influenced: Borelli

Signature
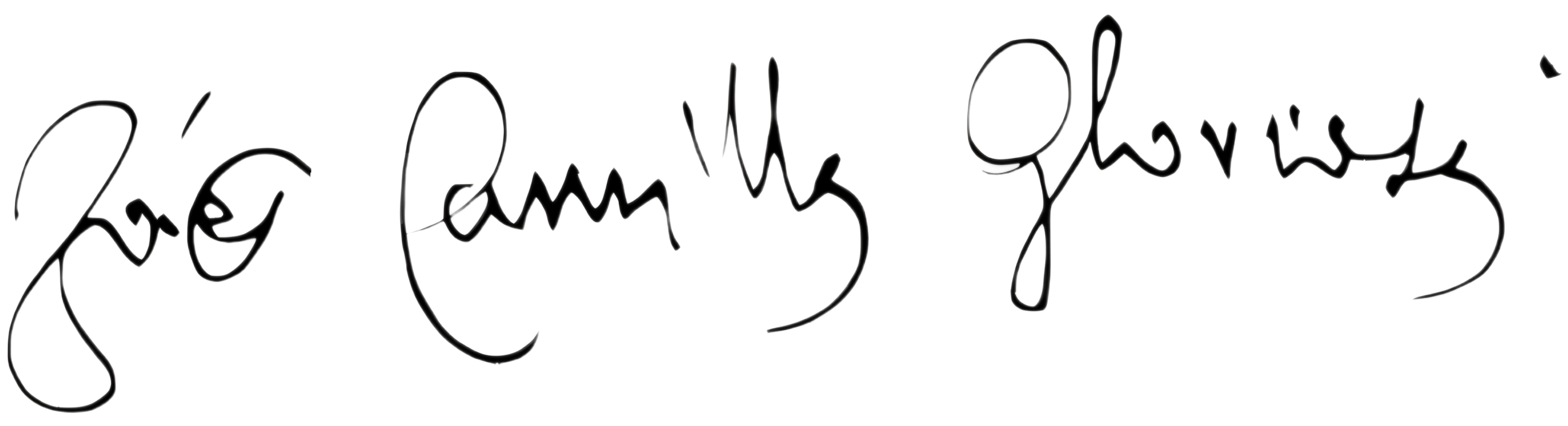

Giovanni Camillo Glorioso (or Gloriosi) (1572 – 8 January 1643) was an Italian mathematician and astronomer. He was a friend of Marino Ghetaldi and Galileo Galilei's successor as professor of mathematics at Padua.

== Life ==
Giovanni Camillo Glorioso was born in the village of Montecorvino Rovella, near Salerno. He earned degrees in philosophy and theology from the University of Naples and studied mathematics with Vincenzo Filliucci and Giovanni Giacomo Staserio at the Jesuit college in Naples. He was a friend and correspondent of Galileo Galilei and replaced him as professor of mathematics at the University of Padua in 1613. He became famous for his observations of the comet of 1618, of Mars, and of Saturn. He was a close friend of the mathematician Antonio Santini (1577-1662) and was involved in a series of bitter arguments with the Aristotelian philosophers Scipione Chiaramonti and Fortunio Liceti and the Swiss mathematician Barthélemy Souvey, who succeeded him in the chair of mathematics at Padua in 1624.

Glorioso was particularly harsh in his attack on Scipione Chiaramonti's efforts to defend traditional Aristotelian cosmology. He criticised Chiaramonti's De tribus novis stellis and in 1636 Charamonti published a refutation, Examen censurae Gloriosi, to which Glorioso replied the following year Castigatio examinis. To this Chiaramonti responded in turn with Castigatio Ioannis Camilli Gloriosi aduersus Scipionem Claramontium Caesenatem (1638). Glorioso's final contribution to this dispute was his Responsio (1641). As he died soon after, this allowed Chiaramonti the last word, which he took with a volume of more than 500 pages, summarising his Aristotelian positions on a wide range of topics, his Opus Scipionis Claramontis Caesenatis de Universo (1644).

In contrast with Galileo, Glorioso shared Brahe's conclusion that comets were heavenly bodies, a position in agreement with our modern understanding. In a letter written on 29 May 1610 to his friend Johann Schreck, Glorioso attributed the invention of the sector to Michiel Coignet and not to Galileo, although the instrument is now mainly attributed to Coignet's friend Fabrizio Mordente. In the same letter Glorioso also claimed that Galileo did not invent the telescope, but he did only modify a previous invention by a Belgian scholar.

Glorioso was one of the leading italian algebraists of the time. In his most important work, Exercitationum Mathematicarum Decades tres (1627-1639), he confutes the quadrature of the circle by Giambattista della Porta, comments on Viète, and gives the solution of interesting questions respecting the theory of numbers. It's one of the first work to use the notation $Aqqc$ for the equivalent of the current $A^{8}$.

Late in his life Glorioso returned to Naples, where he befriended Francesco Fontana. Glorioso encouraged Fontana to devote himself to astronomical research and gave him access to his own library. Glorioso died in Naples on 8 January 1643. After his death, his library was sold to the viceroy Ramiro Núñez de Guzmán.

== Works ==
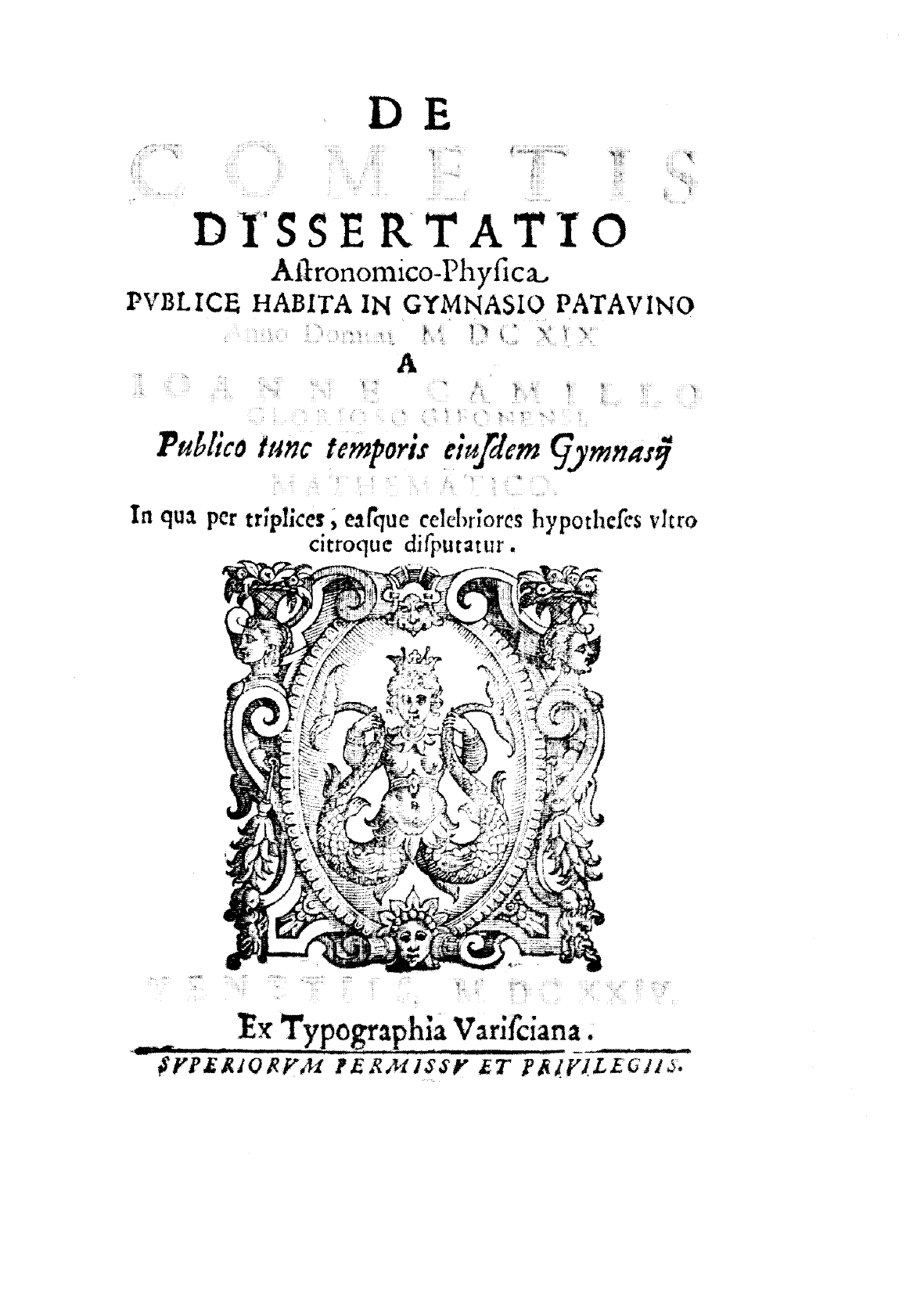
De cometis dissertatio astronomico-physica, Venice, Varisco, 1624

- Ad problema geometricum responsum. Venice: Tommaso Baglioni. 1613.
- De cometis dissertatio astronomico-physica publice habita in gymnasio Patauino anno Domini 1619 (in Latin). Venice: Giovanni Varisco & Varisco Varisco. 1624.
- Responsio ad controversias de cometis peripateticas, seu potius ad calumnias, et mendacia cuiusdam peripatetici (in Latin). Venice: Varisco. 1626.
- Exercitationum mathematicarum decas prima. In qua continentur varia et theoremata et problemata, tum… ad solvendum proposita, tum… inter legendum animadversa (in Latin). Naples: Lazzaro Scoriggio. 1627.
- Exercitationum mathematicarum decas secunda… (in Latin). Naples: Secondino Roncagliolo. 1635.
- Exercitationum mathematicarum decas tertia (in Latin). Naples: Secondino Roncagliolo. 1639.
- Responsio ad vindicias Bartholomaei Soveri (in Latin). Naples: Secondino Roncagliolo. 1630.
- Castigatio examinis Scipionis Claramontii in secundam decadem Io. Camilli Gloriosi (in Latin). Naples: Lazzaro Scoriggio. 1637.
- Responsio ad apologiam Benedicti Maghetti item responsio eiusdem ad Scipionem Claramontium (in Latin). Naples: Secondino Roncagliolo. 1641.
