= Francesco Fontana =

Italian lawyer and astronomer

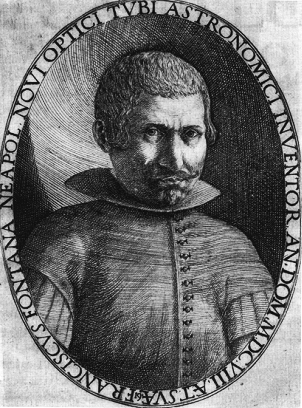
- Portrait of Francesco Fontana
- Born: c. 1585; Naples, Kingdom of Naples
- Died: July 1656 (aged circa 71); Naples, Kingdom of Naples
- Education: University of Naples
- Era: Scientific Revolution
- Known for: Discovery of the daily rotation of Mars; Discovery of the bands on Jupiter's disk
- Scientific career
- Fields: Law, Astronomy, Optics

Signature
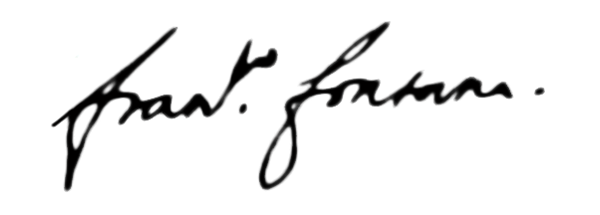

Francesco Fontana (c. 1585, Naples – July 1656, Naples) was an Italian lawyer and an astronomer whose improved telescope designs resulted in his discovery of the daily rotation of Mars and of the bands on Jupiter's disk.

== Biography ==
Francesco Fontana studied law at the University of Naples, and then he became a lawyer in the court at the Castel Capuano. Failing to always find truth in the Court, he began to study mathematics and astronomy. He created woodcuts showing the Moon and the planets as he saw them through a self-constructed telescope. Fontana was close to the botanist Fabio Colonna, who commissioned him to make microscopic observations in 1625, and the Neapolitan Jesuits, and in particular Fathers Gerolamo Sersale, Giovanni Battista Zupi and Giovanni Giacomo Staserio. Fontana traced, in 1636, the first drawing of Mars and discovered its rotation.

In February 1646, he published the book Novae coelestium terrestriumq[ue] rerum observationes, et fortasse hactenus non-vulgatae, where he presented all the observations of the Moon made from 1629 until 1645, the drawings of the bands seen on Jupiter's disc, the strange appearances of Saturn, as well as of the stars of the Milky Way. With a Fontana telescope, the Jesuit Giovanni Battista Zupi observed for the first time in 1639 the phases of Mercury, evidence, together with the phases of Venus observed by Galileo in 1610, that Copernicus's heliocentric theory was correct.

In the autumn of 1639, testing a 22-palm telescope of his own making, Fontana discovered the characteristic bands of Jupiter's atmosphere. In 1645, he claimed to have observed a satellite of Venus (Paul Stroobant demonstrated in 1887 that all similar observations were not related to a putative satellite of Venus).

He died of plague in Naples with the whole family in July 1656. The lunar crater Fontana and the crater Fontana on Mars are named in his honor.

== Telescope ==
Fontana began his career as an optician around 1620, acquiring a certain reputation with the members of the Accademia dei Lincei, for whom he made numerous microscopes and with whom he worked as microscopist. Near the end of the decade, this collaboration terminated, perhaps due to Fontana’s close ties with the Neapolitan Jesuits, hostile to the ideas of Galileo. Fontana had also built small telescopes at least as early as 1626, and was already producing instruments eight palms long by 1629. It was some years, however, before his fame spread beyond Naples and the narrow circle of the Linceans, whose chief interest was naturalist research. In early 1637, some of Fontana’s lenses arrived in Rome.

By early 1637, Fontana was already making telescopes much larger than those commonly used at the time. Since he had first entered the field of astronomy, the structure of the telescope had remained unchanged, as well as its size, and hence its magnifying power. Fontana’s instrument thus marked a major turning point, showing that the telescope, far from having fully expressed its potential, could still be improved, and not in size alone. Since his first known model, Fontana had adopted the converging eyepiece. This optical combination had been theorised by Kepler in his Dioptrice, published in Augsburg in 1611 but Fontana was likely the first to apply it in practice and was the first to make it widely known. Unlike the so-called Galilean telescope, fitted with a diverging eyepiece, the Keplerian telescope produces upside-down images (not a serious drawback for astronomical purposes) but offers the advantage of a larger and brighter field of view.

Starting in 1637, Fontana sent numerous lenses for inspection to Benedetto Castelli – the renowned pupil and collaborator of Galileo – who was staying in Rome at the time. Among them, in June of the following year, was the objective for a telescope 14 palms long (~3.1 m). This instrument was enthusiastically accepted by Castelli, who used it for planetary observations and urged the Grand Duke of Tuscany Ferdinando II de' Medici in vain to buy it (it was finally purchased by the Prince of Eccehemburg for the original price of 200 scudi).

Despite Castelli’s wholehearted support, Fontana’s optical products received a cold welcome, being considered inferior or only slightly superior to those produced by the grand-ducal craftsmen. Dating from March 1638, for instance, is a letter in which Vincentio Reinieri informs Galileo of the arrival in Genoa of ‘a portrait of the Moon, sent […] by F. D. Benedetto Castelli, with the report of a new telescope invented by a certain Fontana in Naples,’ asking Galileo if he had heard anything of this. In the reply, which has been lost, Galileo may have belittled the quality of Fontana’s telescopes, as can be deduced from a letter written the following April in which Renieri states that he has ‘been glad to find out that the spyglasses from Naples are not so miraculous as others have written, because, at the great price that was asked for them’, he had despaired of ever having one. In fact Fontana had to struggle against the stubborn reluctance of Galileo, now old and blind, to recognize the superiority of the new Neapolitan telescopes (although admitting that their magnification power was greater than those produced in Florence, he believed they could reveal nothing that he had not already discovered) and the Medicean court’s fear of losing its unchallenged primacy in optical production. For this reason, the strategy pursued by Ferdinando II was not so much that of purchasing a few models as of discovering the secret of their construction. In Florence, Fontana’s optical devices were carefully examined by the grand-ducal artisans and Galileo, as well as Castelli, who reflected on the possible techniques adopted by the Neapolitan telescope maker. Near the end of 1638, negotiations were held during which Fontana offered to give the Grand Duke exclusive rights to his method of processing lenses for the price of 2,000 scudi. The amount was deemed too high, and no agreement was reached.

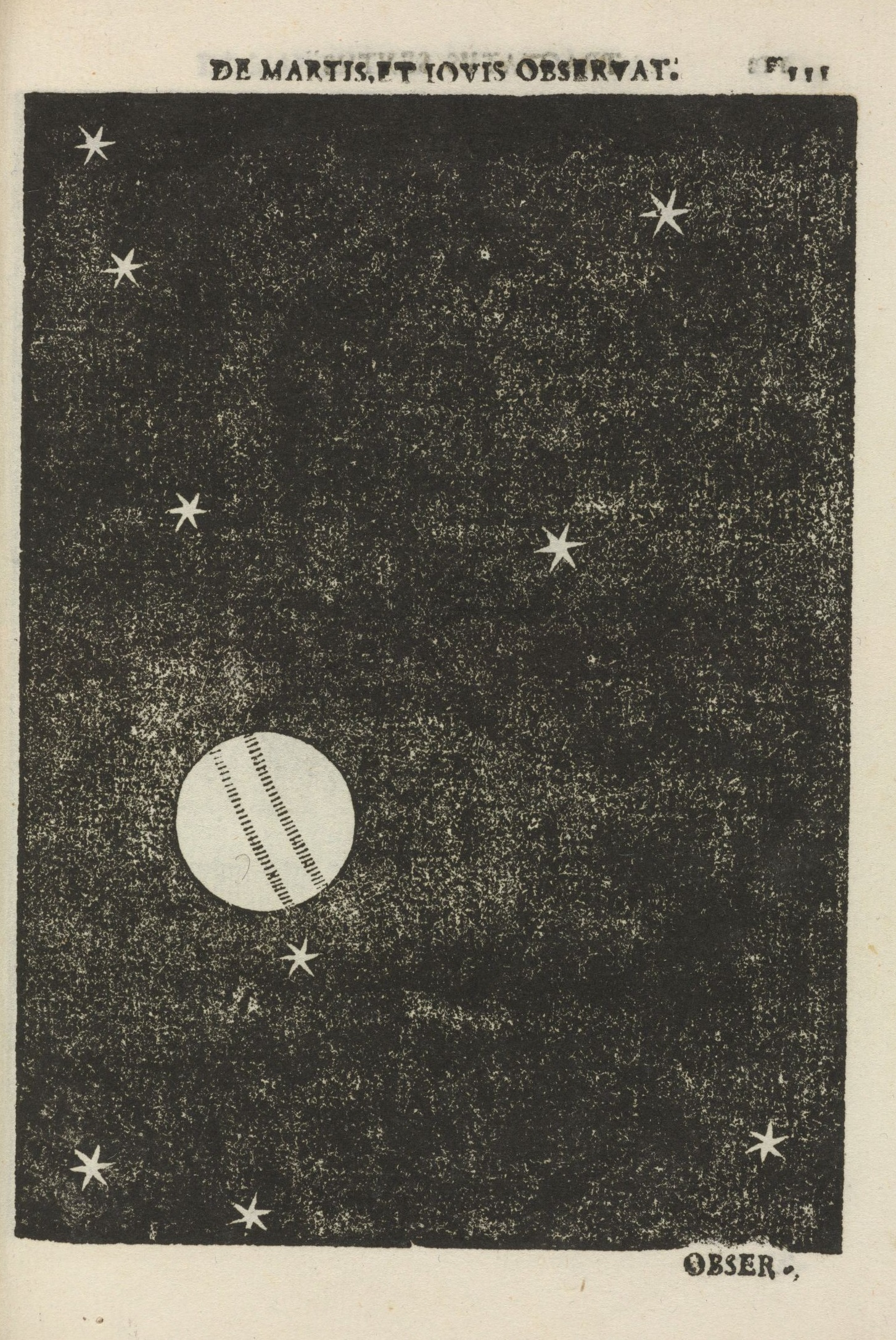
Jupiter against the night sky, woodcut, Francesco Fontana, Novae coelestium, 1646

In the meantime, however, thanks not only to Castelli but also to Giovanni Camillo Glorioso, who from 1613 to 1621 had occupied the prestigious chair at the University of Padua that had once been Galileo’s, the fame of Fontana’s telescopes had spread through much of the peninsula. In March 1638, from Naples, Glorioso had informed Antonio Santini in Milan, of an ‘admirable’ 8-palm telescope, and in the following July, of a 14-palm model with which ‘Jupiter looks like the Moon when full, and has the same cavities and prominences as are found on the Moon; Mars appears a little smaller than Jupiter, and at its centre is a prominence shaped like a very dark cone.’ In September, he sent him an interesting drawing of Saturn, done by Fontana, which Santini then sent to Peter Linder in Venice. Still from Milan, Giovanni Giacomo Cozzolani informed Carlo Antonio Manzini, in Bologna (where the news also reached Bonaventura Cavalieri) of the wondrous new phenomena observed with Fontana’s ‘spyglass’. Information, albeit confused and fragmentary, on the new 14-palm telescopes, evidently able to show the surface details of planets for the first time, reached Holland, England and France as well (where René Descartes believed that Fontana had managed to fabricate hyperbolic lenses).

In October of 1639, tired of trusting to the mediation of Castelli, Fontana wrote directly to the Grand Duke, offering him a 22-palm telescope. As proof of the instrument’s outstanding quality, the letter, which has only recently come to light, 12 contains enclosed a drawing of Jupiter made by Fontana himself, which constitutes, as of now, the earliest representation of the planet’s bands, whose discovery was later to be claimed by (or attributed to) many other authors.

== Microscope ==
Fontana also claimed to have invented the compound microscope (two or more lenses in a tube) in 1618, an invention that has many claimants including Cornelis Drebbel, Zacharias Jansen or his father Hans Martens, and Galileo Galilei.

== Bibliography ==
- Stelluti, Francesco (1630). Persio tradotto. Rome: Giacomo Mascardi. p. 47.
- Kircher, Athanasius (1646). Ars Magna Lucis et Umbrae. Rome: Lodovico Grignani. pp. 16, 831.
- Riccioli, Giovanni Battista (1651). Almagestum novum. Bologna: ex typotraphia haeredis Victorij Benatij. p. 203, 208, 485ff.
- Crasso, Lorenzo (1666). Elogii de gli huomini letterati. Vol. II. Venetia: Combi, & La Noù. pp. 296–300.
- Barbieri, Matteo (1778). Notizie istoriche dei mattematici e filosofi del Regno di Napoli. Naples: Vincenzio Mazzola-Vocola. pp. 134–138.
- Napoli Signorelli, Pietro (1786). Vicende della coltura nelle due Sicilie. Vol. V. Naples: Vincenzo Flauto. pp. 222–225.
- Rezzi, Luigi Maria (1852). "Sull'invenzione del microscopio". Atti dell'Accademia Pontificia De' Nuovi Lincei. V: 108 ff.
- Huygens, Christiaan (1888). Œuvres complètes. Vol. I. La Haye: Société hollandaise des sciences. ad Indicem.
- Favaro, Antonio (1903). "Galileo e il telescopio di Francesco Fontana". In Atti e Memorie dell'Accademia di Scienze Lettere e Arti di Padova n.s., 19: 61-71.
- Edizione nazionale delle opere di Galileo Galilei, XVII, pp. 192, 308, 363, 375, 383 s.; XVIII, pp. 18, 85; XX, p. 442.
- Il carteggio linceo della vecchia Accademia di Federico Cesi, a cura di Giuseppe Gabrieli, in Memorie della Reale Accademia nazionale dei Lincei, classe di scienze morali storiche e filologiche, s. 6, VII (1942), pp. 1008, 1124, 1127, 1131, 1144f., 1205.
- Arrighi, Gino (1964). "Gli "occhiali" di Francesco Fontana in un carteggio inedito di A. Santini". Physis. VI: 432–448.
- Paolo Galluzzi; Maurizio Torrini, eds. (1975). Le opere dei discepoli di Galileo Galilei. Carteggio 1642–48. Vol. I. Florence: Giunti-Barbèra. ad Indicem.
- Mersenne, Marin (1983). Correspondance. Vol. XV. Paris: éditions du CNRS. ad Indicem.
- Baroncelli, Giovanna (1987). "L'astronomia a Napoli al tempo di Galileo". In Fabrizio Lomonaco; Maurizio Torrini (eds.). Galileo e Napoli. Nales. pp. 197–225.
- Anastasio, Pamela (1997). "FONTANA, Francesco". Dizionario Biografico degli Italiani (in Italian). Vol. 48: Filoni–Forghieri. Rome: Institute of the Italian Encyclopaedia. ISBN 978-88-12-00032-6.
- Del Santo, Paolo (2009). "Italian Optics in the 17th Century: Fontana, Divini and Campani". Astrum 2009: Astronomy and Instruments: Italian Heritage Four Hundred Years After Galileo. Rome: 153–169.
- Del Santo, Paolo (2009). "On an Unpublished Letter of Francesco Fontana to the Grand-Duke of Tuscany Ferdinand II de' Medici". Galilæana: Journal of Galilean Studies. VI: 235–251. doi:10.1400/112985.
