= On the Equilibrium of Planes =

Mechanical treatise by Archimedes

On the Equilibrium of Planes I-II
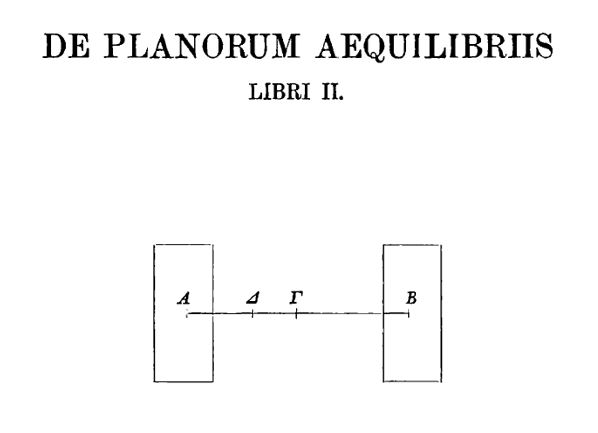
- Author: Archimedes
- Language: Ancient Greek
- Genre: Physics, Geometry

On the Equilibrium of Planes (Ancient Greek: Περὶ ἐπιπέδων ἱσορροπιῶν, romanized: Perí epipédōn isorropiôn) is a treatise by Archimedes in two books. The first book contains a proof of the law of the lever and culminates with propositions on the centre of gravity of the triangle and the trapezium. The second book, which contains ten propositions, examines the centres of gravity of parabolic segments.

According to Pappus of Alexandria, Archimedes' work on levers and his understanding of mechanical advantage caused him to say: "Give me a place to stand on, and I will move the Earth" (Ancient Greek: δός μοί ποῦ στῶ καὶ κινῶ τὴν γῆν, romanized: dṓs moi poû stṓ kaí kinô tḗn gên), though other ancient testimonia are ambiguous regarding the context of the saying.

== Overview ==
The lever and its properties were already well known before the time of Archimedes, and he was not the first to provide an analysis of the principle involved. The earlier Mechanical Problems, once attributed to Aristotle but most likely written by one of his successors, contains a loose proof of the law of the lever without employing the concept of centre of gravity. There is another short work attributed to Euclid entitled On the Balance that also contains a mathematical proof of the law, again without recourse to the centre of gravity.

In contrast, in Archimedes' work the concept of the centre of gravity is crucial. On the Equilibrium of Planes I, which contains seven postulates and fifteen propositions, uses the centre of gravity for both commensurable and incommensurable magnitudes to justify the law of the lever, though some argue not satisfactorily. Archimedes then proceeds to locate the centre of gravity of the parallelogram and the triangle, ending book one with a proof on the centre of gravity of the trapezium.

On the Equilibrium of Planes II shares the same subject matter as the first book but was most likely written at a later date. It contains ten propositions regarding the centre of gravity of parabolic segments exclusively, and examines these segments by substituting them with rectangles of equal area. This exchange is made possible by results obtained in Quadrature of the Parabola, a treatise believed to have been published after book one of On the Equilibrium of Planes.

== Contents ==
=== Book one ===
The first part of book one deals with basic properties of the balance and the law of the lever, while the second and longer part focuses on the centre of gravity of basic plane figures. The argument which allows Archimedes to establish the law of the lever and locate the centre of gravity of many figures is the sixth postulate: If magnitudes at certain lengths be in equilibrium, other (magnitudes) equal to them will also be in equilibrium at the same lengths. In Propositions 4 and 5, Archimedes proves that the centre of gravity of any system consisting of an even number of equal weights, equally distributed, will be located at the midpoint between the two centre weights. Archimedes then uses these theorems to prove the law of the lever in Proposition 6 (for commensurate cases) and Proposition 7 (for incommensurate cases).

Theorem

Weights and a lever in a 4:3 ratio.

In modern terms, given two unequal, but commensurable, weights and a lever arm divided into two unequal, yet commensurable, portions (see sketch opposite), if the magnitudes A and B are applied at points E and D, respectively, the system will be in equilibrium at point C if the weights are inversely proportional to the lengths:

$$A : B = CD : EC\,$$

Proof

Let us assume that lines and weights are constructed to obey the rule using a common measure (or unit) n and in a 4:3 ratio. Now, double the length of ED by duplicating the longer arm on the left, and the shorter arm on the right.

For demonstration's sake, reorder the lines so that CD is adjacent to LE (the two red lines together), and juxtapose with the original (as below):

It is clear that both lines are double the length of the original line ED, that LH has its centre at E, and that HK has its centre at D. Note, additionally, that EH (which is equal to CD) carries the common measure (or unit) n an exact number of times, as does EC and, by extension, CH. It remains then to prove that A applied at E, and B applied at D, will have their centre of gravity at C.

Therefore, as the ratio of LH to HK has doubled the original lengths CD and EC, similarly divide the magnitudes A and B into a 8:6 ratio (a transformation that conserves their original ratio of 4:3), and align them so that the A units (red) are centred on E, while the B units (blue) are centred on D.

Now, since an even number of equal weights, equally spaced, have their centre of gravity between the two middle weights, A is in fact applied at E, and B at D, as the proposition requires. Further, the total system consists of an even number of equal weights equally distributed, and, therefore, following the same principle, C must be the centre of gravity of the full system. Thus, the system does not incline but is in equilibrium at lengths inversely proportional to the weights or 3:4 ratio.

=== Book two ===
The main objective of book two of On the Equilibrium of Planes is the determination of the centre of gravity of any part of a parabolic segment, as shown in Proposition 8.

The book begins with a simpler proof of the law of the lever in Proposition 1, making reference to results found in Quadrature of the Parabola. Archimedes proves the next seven propositions by combining the concept of centre of gravity and the properties of the parabola with the results previously found in On the Equilibrium of Planes I. Specifically, he infers that two parabolas that are equal in area have their centre of gravity equidistant from some point, and later substitutes their areas with rectangles of equal area.

The last two propositions, Propositions 9 and 10, are rather obtuse but focus on the determination of the centre of gravity of a figure cut off from any parabolic segment by a frustum.

== Legacy ==
Archimedes' mechanical works, including On the Equilibrium of Planes, were known but little read in antiquity. Both Hero and Pappus make references to Archimedes in their work on mechanics, mostly in their discussions regarding the centre of gravity and mechanical advantage. A few Roman authors, such as Vitruvius, apparently had some knowledge of Archimedes' work as well.

In the Middle Ages, some Arabic authors were familiar with and extended Archimedes' work on balances and centre of gravity; in the Latin West, however, these ideas were virtually unknown except for a handful of limited cases. It is only in the late Renaissance that the results found in On the Equilibrium of Planes began to spread widely. Archimedes' mathematical approach to physics, especially, became a model for subsequent scientists such as Guidobaldo del Monte, Bernardino Baldi, Simon Stevin, and Galileo Galilei.

The concept of centre of gravity reached a high level of sophistication in the first half of the seventeenth century, particularly in the works of Evangelista Torricelli and Christiaan Huygens, and played a pivotal role in the development of rational mechanics.

=== Criticism ===
A number of researchers have highlighted inconsistencies within the first book of On the Equilibrium of Planes. Berggren questions the authenticity of almost half of book one, noting for instance the redundancy of Propositions 1-3 and 11–12. However, he follows Dijksterhuis in rejecting Mach's criticism of Proposition 6, which indeed proves that "if a system of weights suspended on a balance beam is in equilibrium when supported at a particular point, then any redistribution of these weights, that preserves their common centre of gravity, also preserves the equilibrium."

Additionally, Proposition 7 of book one appears incomplete in its current form, so that strictly speaking Archimedes in the first book demonstrates the law of the lever for commensurable magnitudes only. The second book of On the Equilibrium of Planes is not impacted by these shortcomings because, with the exception of the first proposition, the lever is not treated at all. There is also no definition of the centre of gravity anywhere in Archimedes' extant works, which some scholars argue makes it difficult to follow (or justify) the logical structure of some of his arguments in On the Equilibrium of Planes.
