= Fontana (surname) =

Fontana is a surname. Notable people with the surname include:

== In arts and entertainment ==
=== Architecture ===
- Carlo Fontana (1634 or 1638–1714), an Italian architect
- Domenico Fontana (1543–1607), an Italian architect
- Giovanni Fontana (architect) (1540–1614), an Italian architect
- Jakub Fontana (1710-1773) Polish architect
- Luigi Fontana (1827–1908), an Italian sculptor, painter and architect

=== Music ===
- Bill Fontana (b. 1947), an American composer and author of sound sculptures
- Carl Fontana (1928–2003), an American jazz trombonist
- D.J. Fontana (1931–2018), an American drummer
- Giovanni Battista Fontana (composer) (c. 1571–1630), an Italian composer and violinist
- Jimmy Fontana (1934–2013), an Italian composer and singer-songwriter
- Julian Fontana (1810–1869), a Polish pianist and composer
- Melanie Fontana (b. 1986), an American pop singer
- Wayne Fontana (1945–2020), an English pop singer

=== Visual arts ===
- Annibale Fontana (1540–1587), an Italian sculptor and crystal-worker
- Franco Fontana (born 1933), an Italian photographer
- Giovanni Battista Fontana (painter) (1524–1587), an Italian painter and engraver
- Lavinia Fontana (1552–1614), an Italian painter
- Lucio Fontana (1899–1968), an Argentine modern artist
- Luigi Fontana (1827–1908), an Italian sculptor, painter and architect

=== Writing ===
- D.C. Fontana (1939–2019), an American science fiction writer
- Giovanni Fontana (poet) (born 1946), an Italian poet and publisher
- Tom Fontana (born 1951), an American television writer/producer

=== Other arts ===
- Federica Fontana (born 1977), a model
- Isabeli Fontana (born 1983), a Brazilian model
- Santino Fontana, (born 1982), an American actor
- Tom Fontana (born 1951), an American television writer/producer

== In science and academia ==
- Alessandro Fontana (1936–2013), Italian academic and politician
- David Fontana (1934–2010), British academic, psychologist and author
- Felice Fontana (1730–1805), an Italian scientist
- Francesco Fontana (1580–1656), an Italian astronomer
- Giovanni Fontana (engineer) (ca. 1395 – ca. 1455), Italian physician and engineer
- Gregorio Fontana (1735–1803), an Italian mathematician
- Niccolò Fontana Tartaglia (1499–1557), an Italian mathematician

== In sport ==
- Alberto Fontana (born 1967), an Italian footballer
- Alberto Maria Fontana (born 1974), an Italian footballer
- Anthony Fontana (born 1999), an American soccer player
- Arianna Fontana (born 1990), an Italian short-track speed skater
- José de Anchieta Fontana (1940–1980), a Brazilian soccer player/footballer
- Lorenzo Fontana (born 1996), Italian rower
- Norberto Fontana (born 1975), an Argentine racing driver

== In other fields ==
- Ilaria Fontana (born 1984), Italian politician
- Lorenzo Fontana (born 1980), Italian politician
- Paul J. Fontana (1911–1997), American Marine general, flying ace and Navy Cross recipient
- Riccardo Fontana (1947–2026), Italian Roman Catholic archbishop
- Richard Fontana (birth date unknown), American open-source lawyer

== In fiction ==
- Maria Eleanor Raquel Fontana, antagonist in Dead Rising 4
