= Bonaventura Cavalieri =

Italian monk and mathematician (1598–1647)

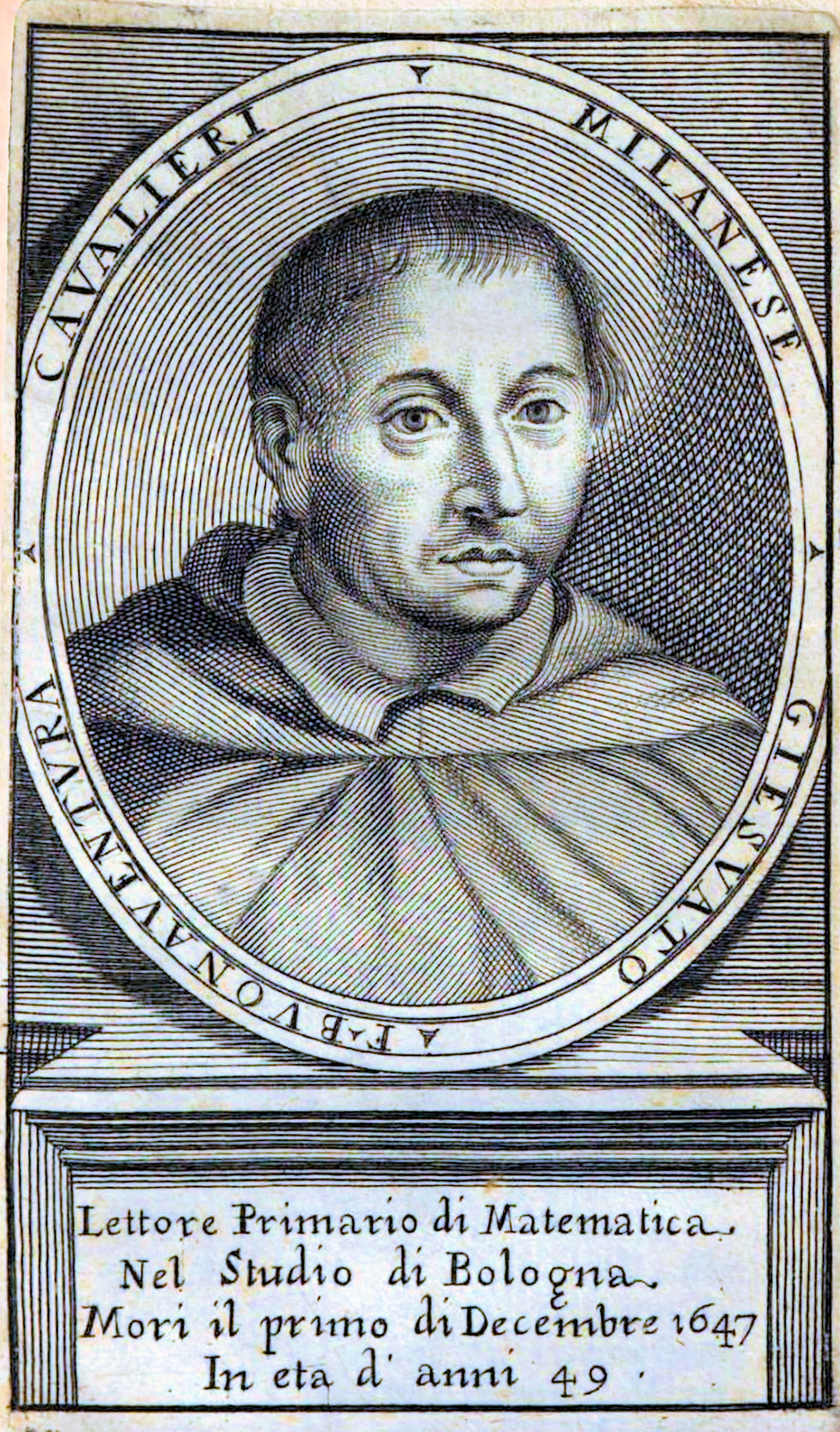
- Illustration of Cavalieri from Trattato della sfera (1682)
- Born: Bonaventura Francesco Cavalieri; 1598; Milan, Duchy of Milan, Hapsburg Spain
- Died: 30 November 1647 (aged 48–49); Bologna, Papal States
- Other name: Bonaventura Cavalerius
- Education: University of Pisa
- Known for: Cavalieri's principle Cavalieri's quadrature formula Method of indivisibles Polar coordinate system
- Scientific career
- Fields: Mathematics

Bonaventura Francesco Cavalieri (Latin: Bonaventura Cavalerius; 1598 – 30 November 1647) was an Italian mathematician and a Jesuate. He is known for his work on the problems of optics and motion, work on indivisibles, the precursors of infinitesimal calculus, and the introduction of logarithms to Italy. Cavalieri's principle in geometry partially anticipated integral calculus.

== Life ==
Born in Milan, Cavalieri joined the Jesuates order (not to be confused with the Jesuits) at the age of fifteen, taking the name Bonaventura upon becoming a novice of the order, and remained a member until his death. He took his vows as a full member of the order in 1615, at the age of seventeen, and shortly after joined the Jesuat house in Pisa. By 1616, he was a student of geometry at the University of Pisa. There he came under the tutelage of Benedetto Castelli, who probably introduced him to Galileo Galilei. In 1617, he briefly joined the Medici court in Florence, under the patronage of Cardinal Federico Borromeo, but the following year, he returned to Pisa and began teaching Mathematics in place of Castelli. He applied for the Chair of Mathematics at the University of Bologna but was turned down.

In 1620, he returned to the Jesuate house in Milan, where he had lived as a novitiate, and became a deacon under Cardinal Borromeo. He studied theology in the monastery of San Gerolamo in Milan, and was named prior of the monastery of St. Peter in Lodi. In 1623, he was made prior of St. Benedict's monastery in Parma, but was still applying for positions in mathematics. He applied again to Bologna and then, in 1626, to Sapienza University, but was declined each time, despite taking six months' leave of absence to support his case to Sapienza in Rome. In 1626 he began to suffer from gout, which would restrict his movements for the rest of his life. He was also turned down from a position at the University of Parma, which he believed was due to his membership of the Jesuate order, as Parma was administered by the Jesuit order at the time. In 1629 he was appointed Chair of Mathematics at the University of Bologna, which is attributed to Galileo's support of him to the Bolognese senate.

He published most of his work while at Bologna, though some of it had been written previously; his Geometria Indivisibilibus, where he outlined what would later become the method of indivisibles, was written in 1627 while in Parma and presented as part of his application to Bologna, but was not published until 1635. Contemporary critical reception was mixed, and Exercitationes geometricae sex (Six Exercises in Geometry) was published in 1647, partly as a response to criticism. Also at Bologna, he published tables of logarithms and information on their use, promoting their use in Italy.

Galileo exerted a strong influence on Cavalieri, and Cavalieri would write at least 112 letters to Galileo. Galileo said of him, "few, if any, since Archimedes, have delved as far and as deep into the science of geometry." He corresponded widely; his known correspondents include Marin Mersenne, Evangelista Torricelli and Vincenzo Viviani. Torricelli in particular was instrumental in refining and promoting the method of indivisibles. He also benefited from the patronage of Cesare Marsili.

Towards the end of his life, his health declined significantly. Arthritis prevented him from writing, and much of his correspondence was dictated and written by Stephano degli Angeli, a fellow Jesuate and student of Cavalieri. Angeli would go on to further develop Cavalieri's method.

In 1647, he died, probably of gout.

== Science, Mathematics Work ==
From 1632 to 1646, Cavalieri published eleven books dealing with problems in astronomy, optics, motion and geometry.

=== Work in optics ===
Cavalieri's first book, first published in 1632 and reprinted once in 1650, was Lo Specchio Ustorio, overo, Trattato delle settioni coniche, or The Burning Mirror, or a Treatise on Conic Sections. The aim of Lo Specchio Ustorio was to address the question of how Archimedes could have used mirrors to burn the Roman fleet as they approached Syracuse, a question still in debate. The book went beyond this purpose and also explored conic sections, reflections of light, and the properties of parabolas. In this book, he developed the theory of mirrors shaped into parabolas, hyperbolas, and ellipses, and various combinations of these mirrors. He demonstrated that if, as was later shown, light has a finite and determinate speed, there is minimal interference in the image at the focus of a parabolic, hyperbolic or elliptic mirror, though this was theoretical since the mirrors required could not be constructed using contemporary technology. This would produce better images than the telescopes that existed at the time.

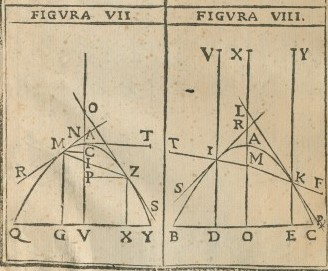
Geometrical figures from Lo Speccio Ustorio, used in proofs of properties of parabolic reflecting surfaces.

He also demonstrated some properties of curves. The first is that, for a light ray parallel to the axis of a parabola and reflected so as to pass through the focus, the sum of the incident angle and its reflection is equal to that of any other similar ray. He then demonstrated similar results for hyperbolas and ellipses. The second result, useful in the design of reflecting telescopes, is that if a line is extended from a point outside of a parabola to the focus, then the reflection of this line on the outside surface of the parabola is parallel to the axis. Other results include the property that if a line passes through a hyperbola and its external focus, then its reflection on the interior of the hyperbola will pass through the internal focus; the reverse of the previous, that a ray directed through the parabola to the internal focus is reflected from the outer surface to the external focus; and the property that if a line passes through one internal focus of an ellipse, its reflection on the internal surface of the ellipse will pass through the other internal focus. While some of these properties had been noted previously, Cavalieri gave the first proof of many.

Lo Specchio Ustorio also included a table of reflecting surfaces and modes of reflection for practical use.

Cavalieri's work also contained theoretical designs for a new type of telescope using mirrors, a reflecting telescope, initially developed to answer the question of Archimedes' Mirror and then applied on a much smaller scale as telescopes. He illustrated three different concepts for incorporating reflective mirrors within his telescope model. Plan one consisted of a large, concave mirror directed towards the sun as to reflect light into a second, smaller, convex mirror. Cavalieri's second concept consisted of a main, truncated, paraboloid mirror and a second, convex mirror. His third option illustrated a strong resemblance to his previous concept, replacing the convex secondary lens with a concave lens.

=== Work in geometry and the method of indivisibles ===
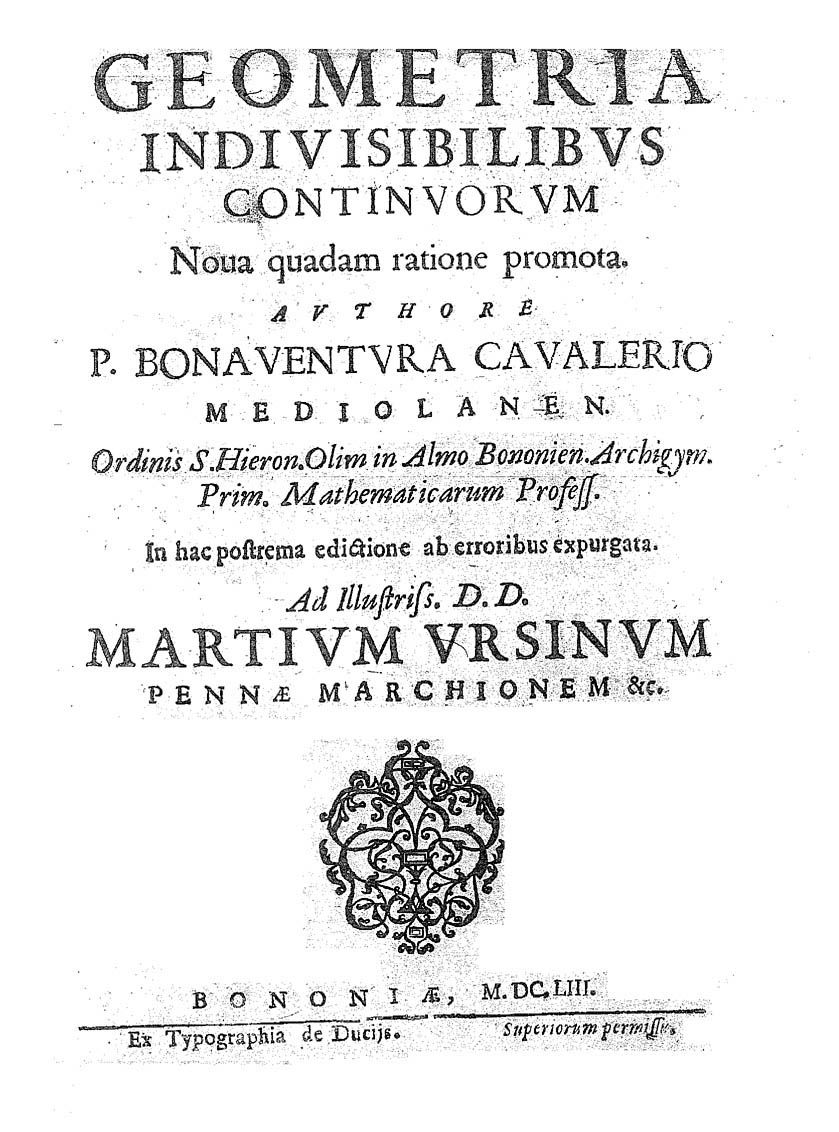
The frontispiece of the Geometria indivisibilibus.

Inspired by earlier work by Galileo, Cavalieri developed a new geometrical approach called the method of indivisibles to calculus and published a treatise on the topic, Geometria indivisibilibus continuorum nova quadam ratione promota, or Geometry, developed by a new method through the indivisibles of the continua. This was written in 1627, but was not published until 1635. In this work, Cavalieri considers an entity referred to in the text as 'all the lines' or 'all the planes' of a figure, an indefinite number of parallel lines or planes within the bounds of a figure that are comparable to the area and volume, respectively, of the figure. Later mathematicians, improving on his method, would treat 'all the lines' and 'all the planes' as equivalent or equal to the area and volume, but Cavalieri, in an attempt to avoid the question of the composition of the continuum, insisted that the two were comparable but not equal.

These parallel elements are called indivisibles respectively of area and volume and provide the building blocks of Cavalieri's method, and are also fundamental features of integral calculus. He also used the method of indivisibles to calculate the result which is now written $\int_{0}^{1} x^2\,dx = \frac13$, in the process of calculating the area enclosed in an Archimedean Spiral, which he later generalised to other figures, showing, for instance, that the volume of a cone is one-third of the volume of its circumscribed cylinder.

An immediate application of the method of indivisibles is Cavalieri's principle, which states that the volumes of two objects are equal if the areas of their corresponding cross-sections are in all cases equal. Two cross-sections correspond if they are intersections of the body with planes equidistant from a chosen base plane. (The same principle had been previously used by Zu Gengzhi (480–525) of China, in the specific case of calculating the volume of the sphere.)

The method of indivisibles, as set out by Cavalieri, was powerful but was limited in its usefulness in two respects. First, while Cavalieri's proofs were intuitive and later demonstrated to be correct, they were not rigorous; second, his writing was dense and opaque. While many contemporary mathematicians furthered the method of indivisibles, the Geometria indivisibilibus critical reception was severe. Andre Taquet and Paul Guldin both published responses to the Geometria indivisibilibus. Guldin's particularly in-depth critique suggested that Cavalieri's method was derived from the work of Johannes Kepler and Bartolomeo Sovero, attacked his method for a lack of rigorousness, and then argues that there can be no meaningful ratio between two infinities, and therefore it is meaningless to compare one to another.

Cavalieri's Exercitationes geometricae sex or Six Geometric Exercises (1647) was written in direct response to Guldin's criticism. It was initially drafted as a dialogue in the manner of Galileo, but correspondents advised against the format as being unnecessarily inflammatory. The charges of plagiarism were without substance, but much of the Exercitationes dealt with the mathematical substance of Guldin's arguments. He argued, disingenuously, that his work regarded 'all the lines' as a separate entity from the area of a figure, and then argued that 'all the lines' and 'all the planes' dealt not with absolute but with relative infinity, and therefore could be compared. These arguments were not convincing to contemporaries. The Exercitationes nonetheless represented a significant improvement to the method of indivisibles. By applying transformations to his variables, he generalised his previous integral result, showing that$\int_{0}^{1} x^n\,dx = \frac1{n+1}$ for $n\in\{3,\dots,9\}$, which is now known as Cavalieri's quadrature formula.

=== Work in astronomy ===
Towards the end of his life, Cavalieri published two books on astronomy. While they use the language of astrology, he states in the text that he did not believe in or practice astrology. Those books were the Nuova pratica astrologica (1639) and the Trattato della ruota planetaria perpetua (1646).

=== Other work ===
He published tables of logarithms, emphasising their practical use in the fields of astronomy and geography.

Cavalieri also constructed a hydraulic pump for a monastery that he managed. The Duke of Mantua obtained one similar.

== Legacy ==
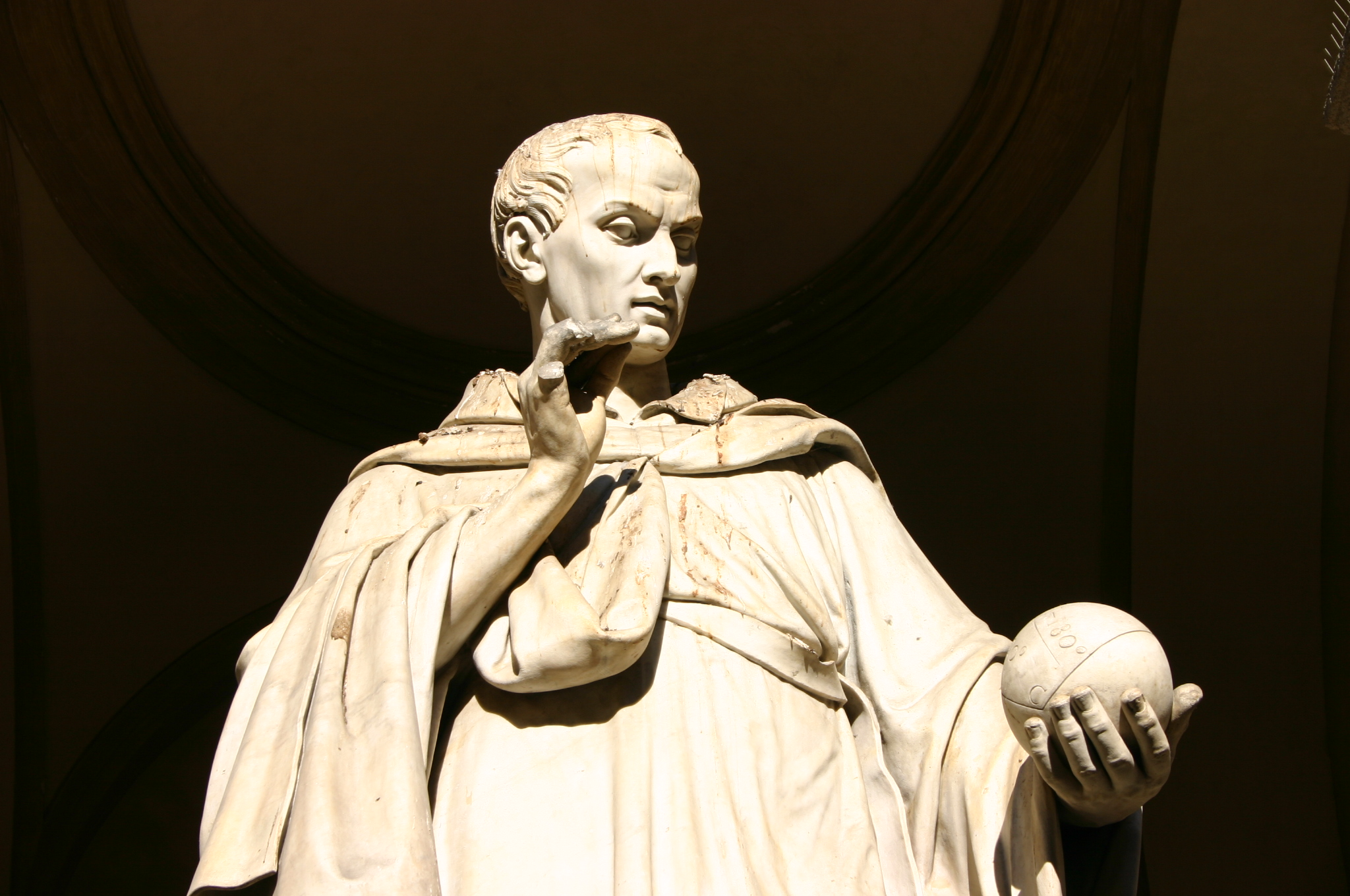
Monument to Cavalieri by Giovanni Antonio Labus, Palazzo di Brera, Milan, 1844

According to Gilles-Gaston Granger, Cavalieri belongs with Newton, Leibniz, Pascal, Wallis and MacLaurin as one of those who in the 17th and 18th centuries "redefine[d] the mathematical object".

The lunar crater Cavalerius is named after Cavalieri.

== See also ==
- Evangelista Torricelli
- Stefano degli Angeli
- Cavalieri's quadrature formula

== Sources ==
- The Galileo Project: Cavalieri
