= Cesare Marsili =

Italian philosopher (1592–1633)

Cesare Marsili (Bologna, 31 January 1592 – Bologna, March 22, 1633) was an Italian intellectual and associate of Galileo Galilei.

== Early life ==
Cesare Marsili was born into one of the most important senatorial families of Bologna, the son of Filippo Marsili and Elizabetta Rossi. From an early age he assumed various positions of authority in the city, becoming a member of the Council of Elders, tribune of the people, and standard-bearer of justice. In 1622, just thirty years old, was elected Superintendent of Water, a position for which he required hydraulic and mathematical skills that he had probably learned from Giovanni Antonio Magini, professor of mathematics and astronomy at the University of Bologna. On 10 November 1628, he married a noblewoman named Elena Ballatini.

An efficient government man and an educated scholar, Marsili was a member of several academies, including the Gelati, the Notte and the Torbidi. In 1624 he went to Rome following the election of Pope Urban VIII and there he met Galileo Galilei, through whom he became a member of the Accademia dei Lincei in 1625. Galileo had had a close friendship with Filippo Salviati for many years, and since his early death had lacked a close confidant. Marsili quickly came to fill this role for him. Marsili was also an enthusiastic jouster and is known to have participated a number of tournaments between 1615 and 1628.

== Correspondence with Galileo ==
Marsili's friendship with Galileo and the extensive correspondence between them cast light on the nature of Galileos' work and the activities of the Accademia dei Lincei. Because of his social standing, he was a vital link between Galileo and the political elites in Rome and Bologna. From this correspondence emerges Marsili's passion for experiments and measuring instruments, to which he devoted his own studies and activities. On one occasion, we know that Galileo send him two top-quality telescope lenses, and promised him a telescope in due course.

The letters also provide insight into otherwise unknown experiments. In April 1626, after learning from Marsili that "a certain engineer" in Bologna had built a device that imitated the motion of the tides, Galileo responded that he had made a similar machine himself twenty years previously, but that it had not been for studying the tides. Galileo's accounts indicate that he had a clear idea of the principles of the thermometer by around 1606-08, so the claim to have invented it properly belong to him. In another letter of 7 July 1626, Marsili reported that a Bolognese artisan had succeeded in manufacturing a mirror that could produce the effects of a telescope, but that it had not yet been possible for him to verify its working. As the correspondence continued, it was clear that Marsili and Galileo were developing the concept of the reflecting telescope, an idea that was to be developed by Cavalieri.

== Relations with Cavalieri ==
As prominent member of the ruling families in Bologna, Marsili played a key role in the appointment of Bonaventura Cavalieri to the chair of mathematics at the University, vacant since the death of Magini, in 1617. There was no shortage of candidates, including Kepler, who politely declined, doubting the freedom he would enjoy at Bologna as a Protestant heliostaticist. Thanks to the lobbying undertaken by Marsili, Galileo was highly regarded in Bologna, and he was a patron of Cavalieri, who was a pupil of his associate Benedetto Castelli. Castelli, who was professor of mathematics at Pisa, was known to Marsili through his work as Superintendent of Water, when he had visited Bologna with a commission of experts sent by the pope to resolve a dispute between Bologna and Ferrara over the management of the Po and the Reno, and he recommended Cavalieri.

After Cavalieri took up his chair, they worked together to promote the ideas of Galileo; Marsili also mediated the argument which broke out between Galileo and Cavalieri when the young mathematician published The Burning Mirror in 1632, which Galileo felt made use of his own ideas and demonstrations. Thanks to Marsili's good offices, amicable relations between the two men were restored.

== Dialogue Concerning the Two Chief World Systems ==
Marsili's friendship proved invaluable to Galileo in the preparation of his great work Dialogue Concerning the Two Chief World Systems. Galileo finally decided to finally respond to Francesco Ingoli's work of 1616, known as De situ et quiete Terrae contra Copernici Systema disputatio challenging the theories of Copernicus. Marsili undertook to obtain a copy of it, and took part in the discussions Galileo held with his friends to work out the main lines of his counter-argument. Marsili also saw a manuscript draft of Galileo's response, and found himself the main point of contact between Galileo and other thinkers, including the peripatetic Scipione Chiaramonti and Kepler. Marsili was well aware of the importance Galileo's Dialogue, and undertook a sustained campaign of letter writing to make other Bolognese writers and scholars aware of its forthcoming publication. While preparing the ground for Galileo's ideas, he carefully avoided confrontation with traditional Aristotelian scholars. He also ordered 32 copies of the Dialogue from the printers, to sell to interested readers in Bologna.

Because of the importance Galileo's book, Marsili sought to have his own name included in it in some positive light. In his letter to Galileo of 27 March 1631 he explicitly requested a mention, and at the same time informed him of a discovery he had made. The marble sundial created some five decades previously by Ignazio Danti on the facade of Santa Maria Novella did not in fact align with the sun at the equinox. He went on to refer to a number of other discrepancies between modern astronomical data and that reported by Ptolemy and other ancient writers. Galileo obliged him. In the fourth day of his Dialogue, Marsili features in a complimentary exchange between Salviati and Sagredo:

SALVIATI: 'There is now a fifth novelty from which one might be able to able to argue for the motion of the terrestrial globe. This refers to the extremely subtle things being discovered by the most illustrious Mr. Cesare Marsili, member of a very noble family of Bologna, and also Lincean Academician; in a most learned essay he states that he has observed a constant though extremely slow motion of the meridian line. Having recently seen this essay with astonishment, I hope he sends copies of it to all students of the marvels of nature.' SAGREDO: 'This is not the first time I have heard of this gentleman's refined learning and of his great concern to be a patron to all scholars. If this or some other work of his comes out, we can be sure it will be a thing of distinction.'

After the publication of the Dialogue in 1632, Marsili died, on 22 March 1633. He was buried in the family chapel in the San Petronio Basilica. His essay, referred to in the Dialogue is not extant and appears never to have been published, like other works attributed to him by eighteenth-century biographers.
