= Fontana (lunar crater) =

Lunar impact crater

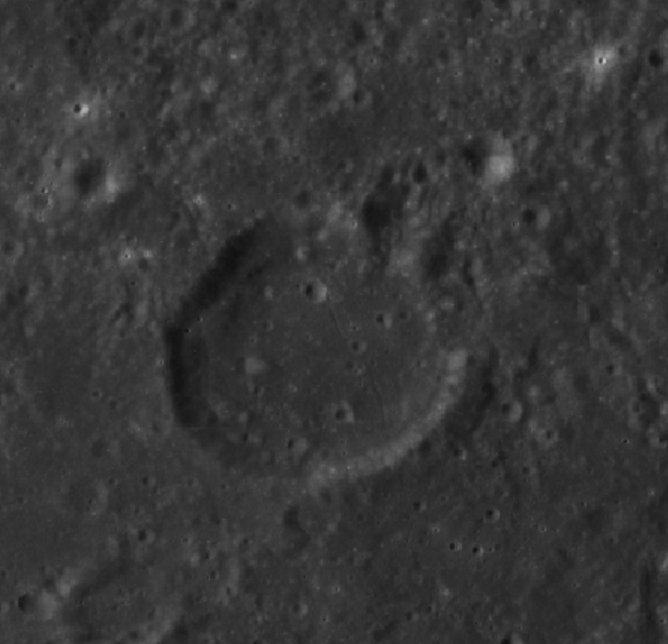
- LROC image
- Coordinates: 16.1°S 56.6°W
- Diameter: 31.47 km (19.55 mi)
- Depth: 1.5 km (0.93 mi)
- Colongitude: 57° at sunrise
- Formation: Early Imbrian
- Eponym: Francesco Fontana

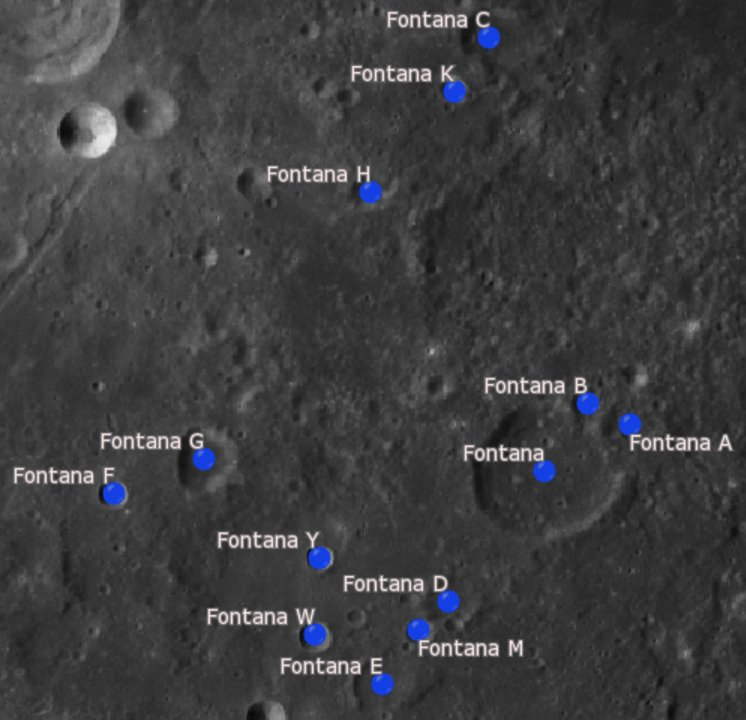
Satellite features

Fontana is a lunar impact crater that is located in the southwestern part of the Moon's near side, to the south of the Oceanus Procellarum. It lies east of Crüger crater, to the west-northwest of the flooded crater Zupus. Midway between Fontana and Zupus is a rille system designated Rimae Zupus.

The Fontana crater has been dated to the Early Imbrian period on the lunar geologic timescale. The low rim is bright but narrow and roughly circular. There is an outward bulge at the northern end, and the northwest rim is heavily degraded with a cleft. The interior floor is marked only by several small craterlets, and a low hill is visible on the floor under grazing illumination.

This formation is named after Italian astronomer Francesco Fontana (c. 1585-1646). His name was originally assigned to the Zupus dark spot by the Italian astronomer Giovanni Riccioli in 1651. Its modern designation was officially adopted by the International Astronomical Union in 1935.

== Satellite craters ==
By convention these features are identified on lunar maps by placing the letter on the side of the crater midpoint that is closest to Fontana.

Fontana	Latitude	Longitude	Diameter
A	15.7° S	56.1° W	13 km
B	15.5° S	56.3° W	11 km
C	12.8° S	57.1° W	14 km
D	17.0° S	57.3° W	11 km
E	17.6° S	57.9° W	13 km
F	16.2° S	59.9° W	7 km
G	16.0° S	59.2° W	15 km
H	14.0° S	57.9° W	9 km
K	13.2° S	57.3° W	7 km
M	17.2° S	57.5° W	6 km
W	17.2° S	58.3° W	6 km
Y	16.7° S	58.3° W	5 km

Between Fontana C and Sirsalis J is a lunar swirl feature and an associated magnetic anomaly.
