= Cavalieri's principle =

Geometrical concept relating area and volume

This animation illustrates Cavalieri's Principle in action: two shapes which have the same cross sections that only differ by a horizontal translation have the same volume.

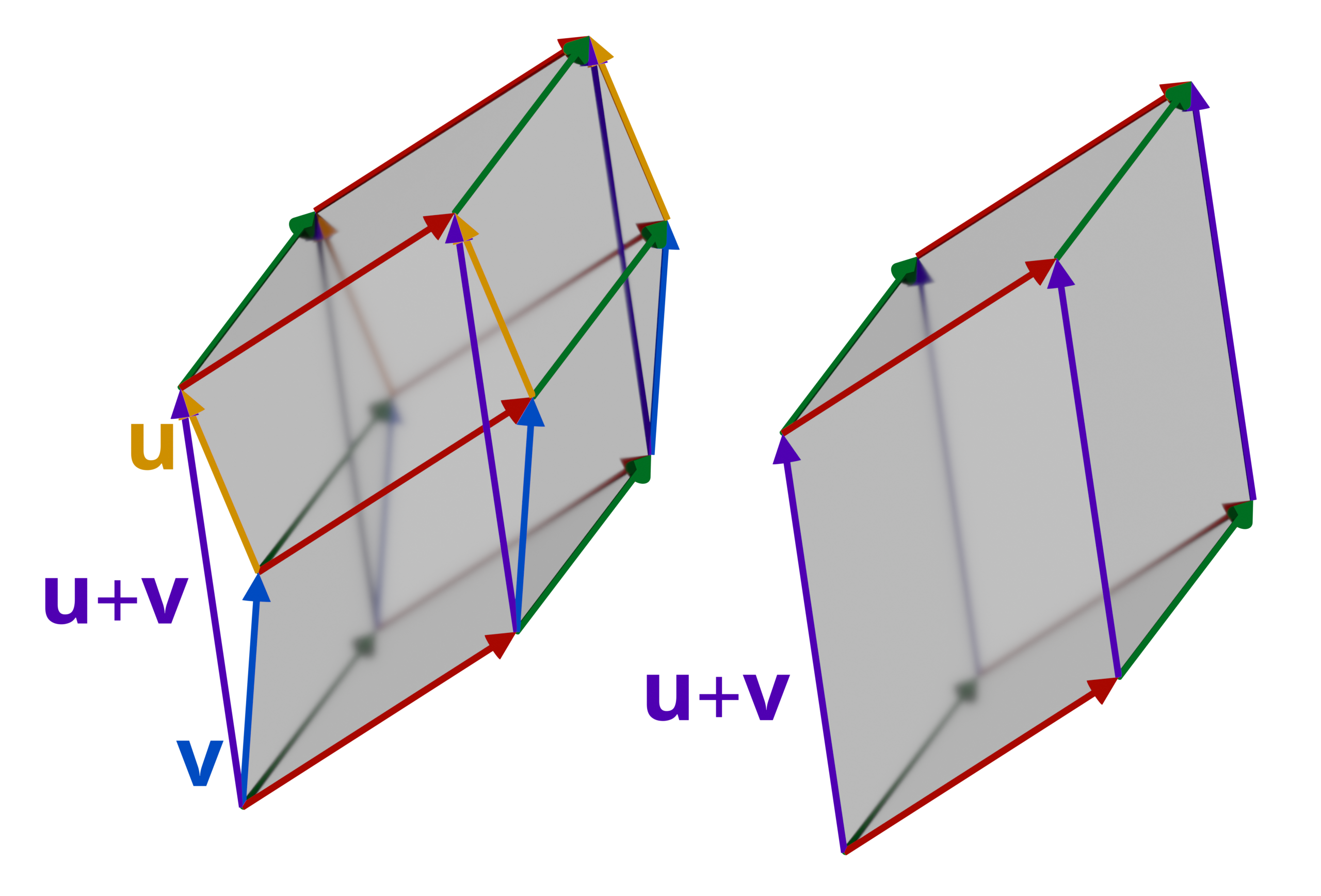
Both parallelepipeds have the same volume by Cavalieri's principle. This can be used to show that the determinant is multilinear.

This highlights Cavalieri's principle in two dimensions. Both regions have equal area despite the lower region's vertical slices being shifted along a sine wave.

In geometry, Cavalieri's principle, a modern implementation of the method of indivisibles, named after Bonaventura Cavalieri, is as follows:

- 2-dimensional case: Suppose two regions in a plane are included between two parallel lines in that plane. If every line parallel to these two lines intersects both regions in line segments of equal length, then the two regions have equal areas.
- 3-dimensional case: Suppose two regions in three-space (solids) are included between two parallel planes. If every plane parallel to these two planes intersects both regions in cross-sections of equal area, then the two regions have equal volumes.

Today Cavalieri's principle is seen as an early step toward integral calculus and, while it is used in some forms, such as its generalization in Fubini's theorem and layer cake representation, results using Cavalieri's principle can often be shown more directly via integration. In the other direction, Cavalieri's principle grew out of the ancient Greek method of exhaustion, which used limits but did not use infinitesimals.

== History ==
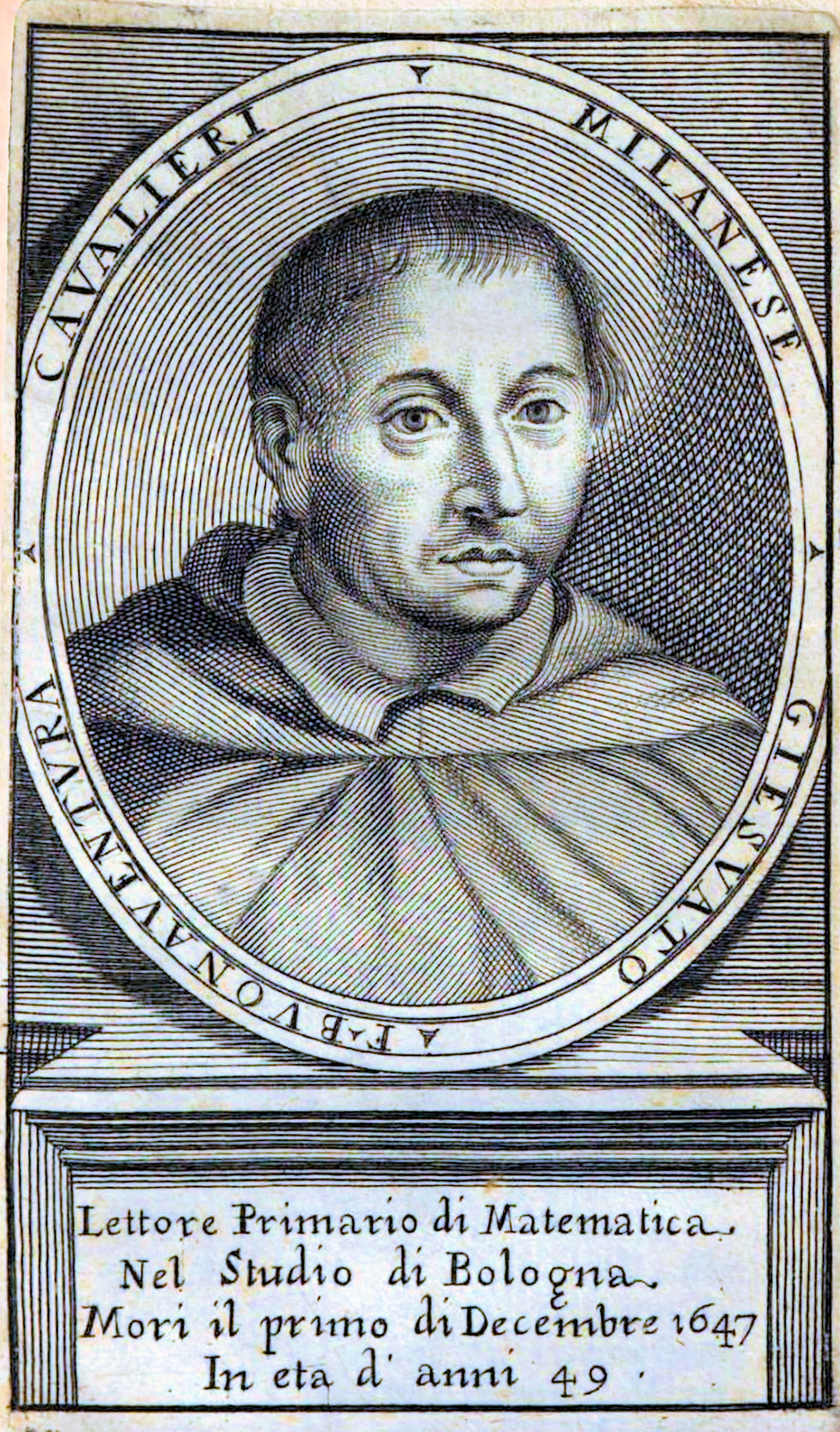
Italian mathematician Bonaventura Cavalieri (1598–1647), from a 1682 publication of his Trattato della sfera

Cavalieri's principle was originally called the method of indivisibles, the name it was known by in Renaissance Europe. Cavalieri developed a complete theory of indivisibles, elaborated in his Geometria indivisibilibus continuorum nova quadam ratione promota (Geometry, advanced in a new way by the indivisibles of the continua, 1635) and his Exercitationes geometricae sex (Six geometrical exercises, 1647). While Cavalieri's work established the principle, in his publications he denied that the continuum was composed of indivisibles in an effort to avoid the associated paradoxes and religious controversies, and he did not use it to find previously unknown results.

In the 3rd century BC, Archimedes, using a method resembling Cavalieri's principle, found the volume of a sphere given the volumes of a cone and cylinder in his work The Method of Mechanical Theorems. In the 5th century AD, Zu Chongzhi and his son Zu Gengzhi established a similar method to find a sphere's volume. Neither of the approaches, however, was known in early modern Europe.

The transition from Cavalieri's indivisibles to Evangelista Torricelli's and John Wallis's infinitesimals was a major advance in the history of calculus. The indivisibles were entities of codimension 1, so that a plane figure was thought as made out of an infinite number of 1-dimensional lines. Meanwhile, infinitesimals were entities of the same dimension as the figure they make up; thus, a plane figure would be made out of "parallelograms" of infinitesimal width. Applying the formula for the sum of an arithmetic progression, Wallis computed the area of a triangle by partitioning it into infinitesimal parallelograms of width 1/∞.

== 2-dimensional ==
=== Cycloids ===
The horizontal cross-section of the region bounded by two cycloidal arcs traced by a point on the same circle rolling in one case clockwise on the line below it, and in the other counterclockwise on the line above it, has the same length as the corresponding horizontal cross-section of the circle.

N. Reed has shown how to find the area bounded by a cycloid using Cavalieri's principle. A circle of radius r can roll in a clockwise direction upon a line below it, or in a counterclockwise direction upon a line above it. A point on the circle thereby traces out two cycloids. When the circle has rolled any particular distance, the angle through which it would have turned clockwise and that through which it would have turned counterclockwise are the same. The two points tracing the cycloids are therefore at equal heights. The line through them is therefore horizontal (i.e. parallel to the two lines on which the circle rolls). Consequently each horizontal cross-section of the circle has the same length as the corresponding horizontal cross-section of the region bounded by the two arcs of cycloids. By Cavalieri's principle, the circle therefore has the same area as that region.

Consider the rectangle bounding a single cycloid arch. From the definition of a cycloid, it has width 2πr and height 2r, so its area is four times the area of the circle. Calculate the area within this rectangle that lies above the cycloid arch by bisecting the rectangle at the midpoint where the arch meets the rectangle, rotate one piece by 180° and overlay the other half of the rectangle with it. The new rectangle, of area twice that of the circle, consists of the "lens" region between two cycloids, whose area was calculated above to be the same as that of the circle, and the two regions that formed the region above the cycloid arch in the original rectangle. Thus, the area bounded by a rectangle above a single complete arch of the cycloid has area equal to the area of the circle, and so, the area bounded by the arch is three times the area of the circle.

== 3-dimensional ==
Proof without words that the volume of a cone is a third of a cylinder of equal diameter and height: 1. A cylinder and a cone have radius r and height h.; 2. The volume ratio is maintained when the height is scaled to h' = r √π.; 3. Decompose the cone into thin slices.; 4. Reshape each slice into a square of the same area using Cavalieri's principle.; 5. Replicate the pyramid twice.; 6. Combine them into a cube to show the volume ratio is 1:3.

=== Cones and pyramids ===
The fact that the volume of any pyramid, regardless of the shape of the base, including cones (circular base), is (1/3) × base × height, can be established by Cavalieri's principle if one knows only that it is true in one case. One may initially establish it in a single case by partitioning the interior of a triangular prism into three pyramidal components of equal volumes. One may show the equality of those three volumes by means of Cavalieri's principle.

In fact, Cavalieri's principle or similar infinitesimal argument is necessary to compute the volume of cones and even pyramids, which is essentially the content of Hilbert's third problem – polyhedral pyramids and cones cannot be cut and rearranged into a standard shape, and instead must be compared by infinite (infinitesimal) means. The ancient Greeks used various precursor techniques such as Archimedes's mechanical arguments or method of exhaustion to compute these volumes.

=== Paraboloids ===
The disk-shaped cross-sectional area of the flipped paraboloid is equal to the ring-shaped cross-sectional area of the cylinder part outside the inscribed paraboloid.

Consider a cylinder of radius $r$ and height $h$, circumscribing a paraboloid $y=h\left(\frac{x}{r}\right)^2$ whose apex is at the center of the bottom base of the cylinder and whose base is the top base of the cylinder.
Also consider the paraboloid $y=h-h\left(\frac{x}{r}\right)^2$, with equal dimensions but with its apex and base flipped.

For every height $0\le y\le h$, the disk-shaped cross-sectional area $\pi\left(\sqrt{1-\frac{y}{h}}\,r\right)^2$ of the flipped paraboloid is equal to the ring-shaped cross-sectional area $\pi r^2-\pi\left(\sqrt{\frac{y}{h}}\,r\right)^2$ of the cylinder part outside the inscribed paraboloid.

Therefore, the volume of the flipped paraboloid is equal to the volume of the cylinder part outside the inscribed paraboloid. In other words, the volume of the paraboloid is $\frac{\pi}{2}r^2h$, half the volume of its circumscribing cylinder.

=== Spheres ===
The disk-shaped cross-sectional area of the sphere is equal to the ring-shaped cross-sectional area of the cylinder part that lies outside the cone.

If one knows that the volume of a cone is $\frac{1}{3}\left(\text{base} \times \text{height}\right)$, then one can use Cavalieri's principle to derive the fact that the volume of a sphere is $\frac{4}{3}\pi r^3$, where $r$ is the radius.

That is done as follows: Consider a sphere of radius $r$ and a cylinder of radius $r$ and height $r$. Within the cylinder is the cone whose apex is at the center of one base of the cylinder and whose base is the other base of the cylinder. By the Pythagorean theorem, the plane located $y$ units above the "equator" intersects the sphere in a circle of radius $\sqrt{r^2-y^2}$ and area $\pi\left(r^2 - y^2\right)$. The area of the plane's intersection with the part of the cylinder that is outside of the cone is also $\pi\left(r^2 - y^2\right)$. As can be seen, the area of the circle defined by the intersection with the sphere of a horizontal plane located at any height $y$ equals the area of the intersection of that plane with the part of the cylinder that is "outside" of the cone; thus, applying Cavalieri's principle, it could be said that the volume of the half sphere equals the volume of the part of the cylinder that is "outside" the cone. The aforementioned volume of the cone is $\frac{1}{3}$ of the volume of the cylinder, thus the volume outside of the cone is $\frac{2}{3}$ the volume of the cylinder. Therefore the volume of the upper half of the sphere is $\frac{2}{3}$ of the volume of the cylinder. The volume of the cylinder is

$$\text{base} \times \text{height}=\pi r^2 \cdot r = \pi r^3$$

("Base" is in units of area; "height" is in units of distance. Area × distance = volume.)

Therefore the volume of the upper half-sphere is $\frac{2}{3}\pi r^3$ and that of the whole sphere is $\frac{4}{3} \pi r^3$.

=== The napkin ring problem ===
If a hole of height $h$ is drilled straight through the center of a sphere, the volume of the remaining band does not depend on the size of the sphere. For a larger sphere, the band will be thinner but longer.

In what is called the napkin ring problem, one shows by Cavalieri's principle that when a hole is drilled straight through the centre of a sphere where the remaining band has height $h$, the volume of the remaining material surprisingly does not depend on the size of the sphere. The cross-section of the remaining ring is a plane annulus, whose area is the difference between the areas of two circles. By the Pythagorean theorem, the area of one of the two circles is $\pi \times (r^2-y^2)$, where $r$ is the sphere's radius and $y$ is the distance from the plane of the equator to the cutting plane, and that of the other is $\pi \times \left(r^2 - \left(\frac{h}{2}\right)^2\right)$. When these are subtracted, the $r^2$ cancels; hence the lack of dependence of the bottom-line answer upon $r$.

== Generalisation to measures ==
Let $\mu$ be a measure on $\Omega \subset \mathbb R^N$. Then Cavalieri's principle would be transcribed for $f \colon \Omega \to \mathbb R^+$ integrable as
$$\int_\Omega f\,\mathrm d\mu=\int_0^\infty \mu\bigl(\{\,x \in \Omega : f(x) > t\,\}\bigr)\,\mathrm dt \;.$$
For a function $f$ on $\Omega$ with values in $\mathbb R$, know that it can be rewritten as the difference of two positive functions $f=f^+ - f^-$, where $f^+$ and $f^-$ denote the positive and negative parts of $f$ respectively.

== See also ==
- Fubini's theorem (Cavalieri's principle is a particular case of Fubini's theorem)
