= Campani =

Campani may refer to:

== Places ==
- Câmpani, a commune in Bihor County, Romania

== People ==
- Campani or Campanians, an ancient Italic people of Oscan origin settled in the area of Capua
- Campani, the inhabitants of the modern Italian Region of Campania, around Naples
- Al Campanis (Alessandro Campani, 1916–1998), Italian-born American baseball player and general manager
- Fabrizio Campani (also Fabrizio Capanus, died 1605), Italian Roman Catholic Bishop of Ferentino
- Giovanni Antonio Campani, called Campanus (1429–1477), Neapolitan-born humanist, protégé of Cardinal Bessarion
- Giuseppe Campani (1635–1715), Italian optician and astronomer
- Luca Campani (born 1990), Italian professional basketball player
- Matteo Campani-Alimenis or Mathieu Campani-Alimenis (17th century), Italian mechanician and natural philosopher

== Other uses ==
- Campani compound microscope, on exhibit at the Museo Galileo in Italy, formerly attributed to Galileo Galilei
