= Sant'Anatolia di Narco =

- Comune
- Comune di Sant'Anatolia di Narco
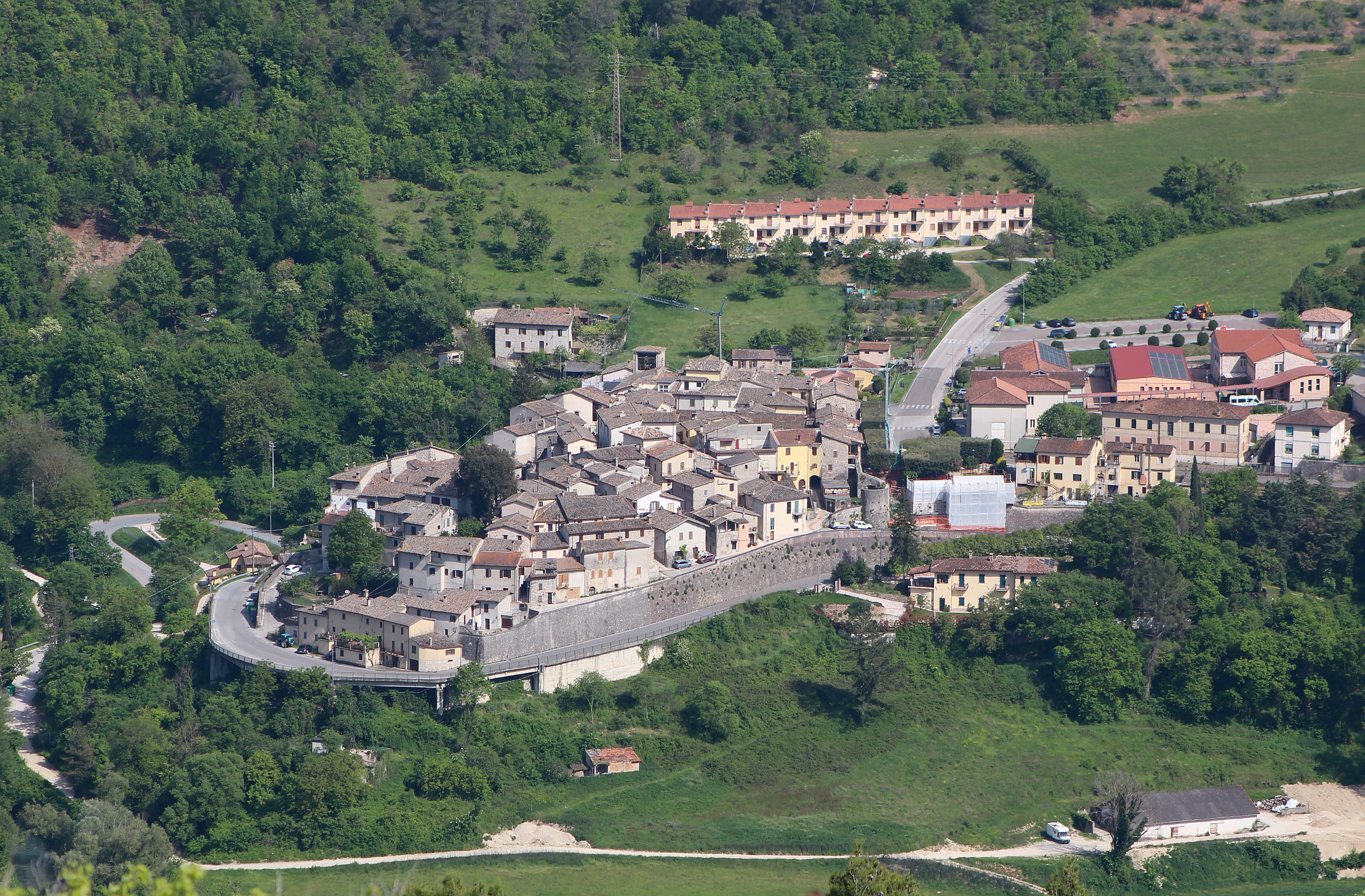
- View of the town

- Coat of arms

- Location within Italy Location within Umbria
- Coordinates: 42.732987°N 12.835709°E
- Country: Italy
- Region: Umbria
- Province: Perugia (PG)

Government
  - Mayor: Tullio Fibraroli

Area
  - Total: 47.2 km^{2} (18.2 sq mi)
- Elevation: 328 m (1,076 ft)

Population (1 January 2025)
  - Total: 486
  - Density: 10.3/km^{2} (26.7/sq mi)
- Demonym: Santanatoliesi
- Time zone: UTC+1 (CET)
  - Summer (DST): UTC+2 (CEST)
- Postal code: 06040
- Dialing code: 0743
- Patron saint: Sant'Anatolia
- Saint day: 9 July
- Website: Official website

Sant'Anatolia di Narco is a comune (municipality) in the Province of Perugia in the Italian region Umbria, located about 60 km southeast of Perugia, in the middle Valnerina. It is a medieval town commanded by a 12th-century castle, with a 14th-century line of walls.

== Etymology ==
The name Narco has been variously explained. It has been connected to the Naharci, a Sabine people of the valley, while other traditions link it to Syrian monks or derive it from a French noble named Narco.

== History ==
In the 8th century the area is recorded as a Lombard curtis, an organized rural estate.

In 1195 a castle known as Naharco was built by Conrad of Urslingen, imperial vicar. In the early 13th century this castle was destroyed and subsequently rebuilt by Spoleto, at which time it was renamed Sant'Anatolia in honor of a martyr venerated by the Benedictines.

Throughout the 13th century the territory was contested between the dukes of Spoleto, the comune of Spoleto, and the Papacy, eventually remaining under the authority of Spoleto and the Papal States.

In 1332 the area came under Ghibelline influence associated with Federico di Urbino. In 1338 several castles refused submission to Spoleto, and the dispute was brought before the ducal court at Montefalco. The outcome was an acquittal and the recognition of full jurisdiction, together with the formation of a federation of twelve castles under the Abbey of San Pietro in Valle.

Between the 14th and 16th centuries there were ongoing territorial disputes with Caso and Scheggino. In 1522 an uprising against Spoleto, led by the bandits Picozzo and Petrone, was suppressed by troops of the Orsini family; the castle was burned and the rebels were killed.

In 1551 a local statute was issued, establishing a system of government based on a general council of household heads, alongside officials including a vicario, podestà, camerario, baiulo, and notary. The community remained broadly loyal to Spoleto and the Papacy until 1798.

Between 1809 and 1814 the territory formed part of the rural canton of Spoleto. By 1827 it included the subordinate communities of Caso, Gavelli, Monte San Vito, and Civitella.

After Italian unification there were proposals to merge the valley communities into Scheggino, but these met with opposition, particularly due to rivalry with Sant'Anatolia. In 1880 the municipality of Castel San Felice was suppressed and annexed to Sant'Anatolia.

In 1895 the population amounted to 1,188 inhabitants.

In 1927 the municipality was dissolved and incorporated into Spoleto under appointed administration, before municipal autonomy was restored in 1930.

== Geography ==
Sant'Anatolia di Narco is situated on the banks of the Nera river, on a hill near the road connecting Terni to Norcia. It lies about 34 kilometres (21 mi) from Terni and stands at an elevation of approximately 328 metres (1,076 ft) above sea level.

Sant'Anatolia lies on a small rise at the foot of Mount Cuperno to the west, although, owing to the configuration of the Valnerina (historically known as the Narco valley), it may be considered as lying within a valley, with a relatively enclosed horizon.

The climate is characterized by hot summers and cold, damp winters, influenced by proximity to the river and by numerous springs emerging between the pieve and the castle. Winds from the north and south prevail. A nearby stream known as the Renari is present.

=== Subdivisions ===
The municipality includes the localities of Caso, Castel San Felice, Gavelli, Grotti, San Martino-Agelli, Sant'Anatolia di Narco.

In 2021, 68 people lived in rural dispersed dwellings not assigned to any named locality. At the time, most of the population lived in Sant'Anatolia di Narco proper (246), and Castel San Felice (116).

=== Castel San Felice ===
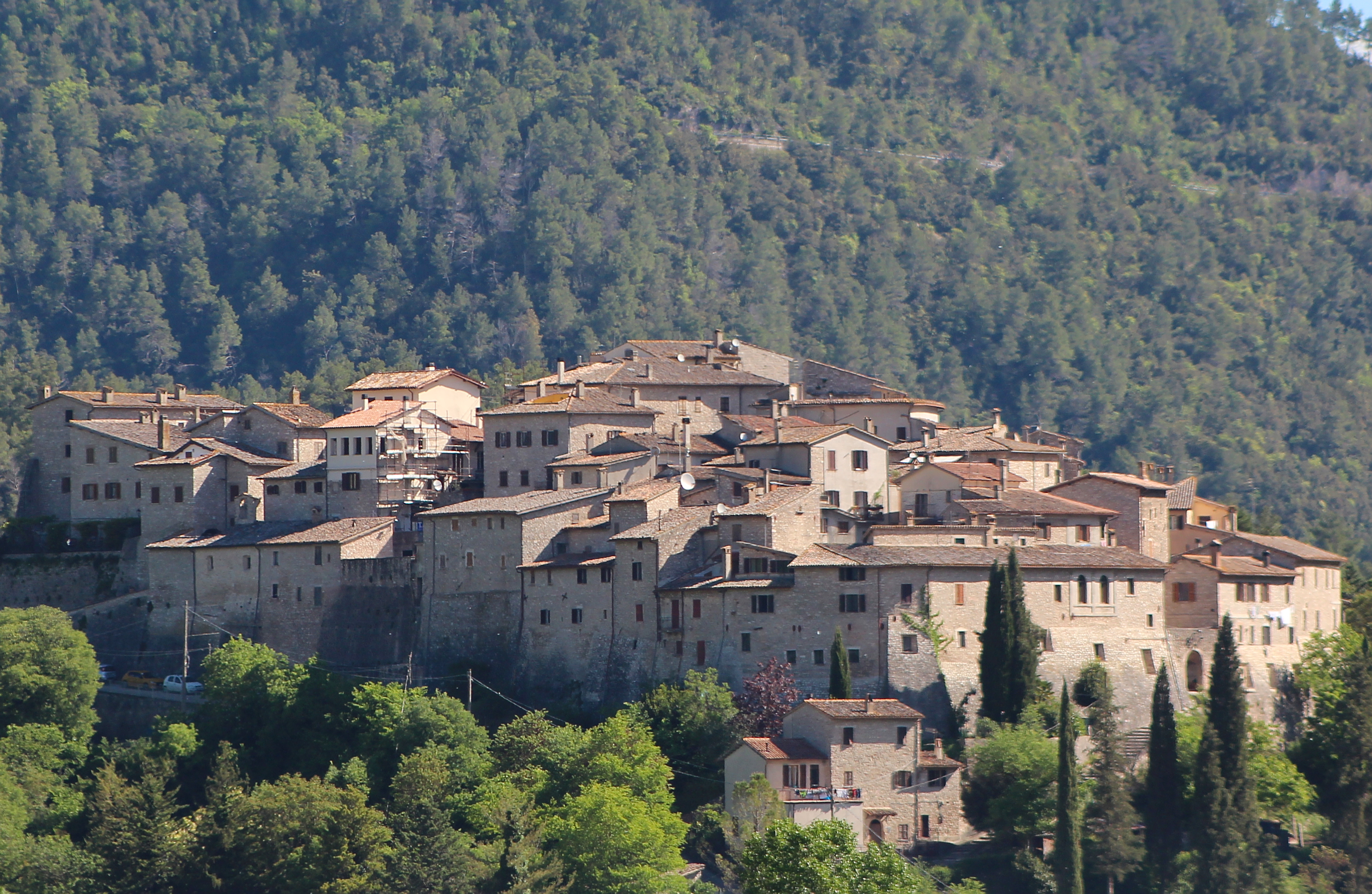
Castel San Felice

Castel San Felice is a small fortified village on the right bank of the Nera River at an elevation of 334 metres (1,096 ft). The settlement occupies a hill within the area dominated by the Coscerno massif, which rises to 1,685 metres (5,528 ft). The site is connected by ancient routes that linked the castles of the valley with the city of Spoleto.

The settlement appears to have developed in connection with Benedictine land‑reclamation works initiated in the 6th century. The monastery established at that time is identified with the present church of San Felice di Narco. The village itself later developed on the hill north of the church and follows the typical layout of fortified hilltop settlements, with concentric ring streets intersected by steep radial streets often formed by stairways.

Buildings are arranged along this street pattern and consist of houses typically organized on two levels, accessed by steep external staircases. The lower level usually served as storage space, sometimes formed within the structures connecting adjacent houses. Many of the buildings are reported to be in a state of abandonment, while others have been adapted for different uses. Two small churches within the castle, dedicated to Saint Paul and Saint Sebastian, gradually lost their religious function as the church of San Felice di Narco became the principal place of worship in the area.

== Economy ==
In the late 19th century the territory produced wheat, maize, wine, oil, acorns, fruit, and truffles.

== Transportation ==
=== Railway ===
From 1926 to 1968 Sant'Anatolia di Narco was served (via the station of the same name) by the Spoleto-Norcia railway, a narrow-gauge line connecting Spoleto with Norcia, which ran from 1 November 1926 to 31 July 1968, when it was closed down. The traces of the railway are almost all preserved, and parts of the trackbed has been converted into a cycle path.

== Religion and culture ==
The name of Sant'Anatolia derives from its patron saint, Saint Anatolia. Her feast day is celebrated on 9 July.

=== Church of Sant'Anatolia ===
The parish church of Sant'Anatolia stands in a square within the settlement. The church has been restored and contains interior painted decoration dating to the 14th and 15th centuries. The high altar has an inlaid marble frontal produced by a 17th‑century Neapolitan workshop. The church also contains a wooden crucifix with statues of the Madonna Addolorata and Saint Francis that come from the former church of Santa Croce, as well as several 17th‑century paintings and a gilded Rococo‑style frame.

=== Abbey of San Felice and Mauro ===
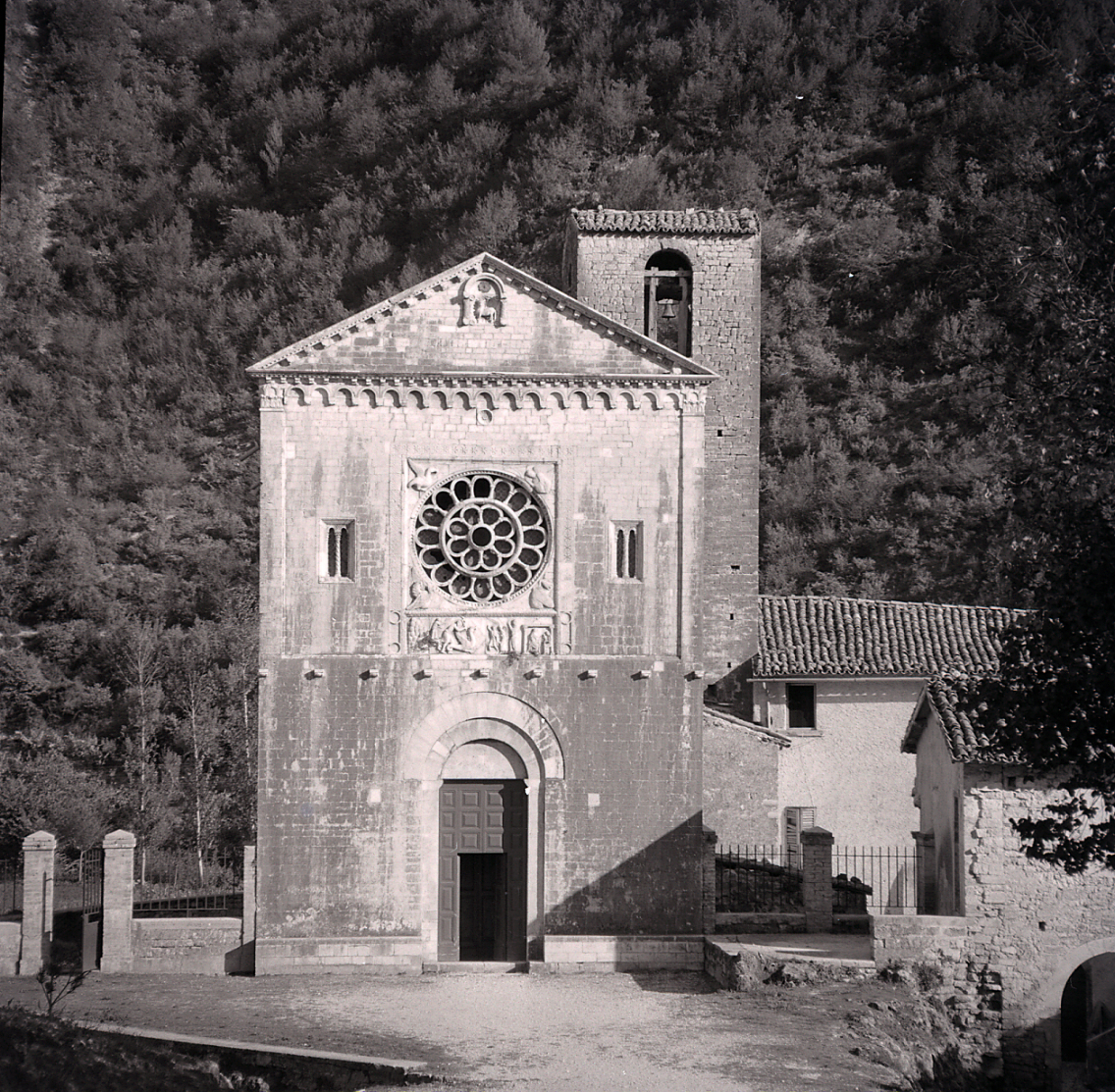
Abbey of San Felice and Mauro. Picture by Paolo Monti.

In the hamlet of Castel San Felice stands the Abbey of San Felice and Mauro. The church of San Felice di Narco is associated with the monastery, founded by Benedictines in the 6th century.

The present church reflects a reconstruction of an earlier monastic complex carried out around 1190. The building has a single nave and a façade that follows models derived from the basilica of San Salvatore in Spoleto.

The façade includes sculptural decoration characteristic of Romanesque architecture in Umbria, including biforas, a rose window, and a low‑relief frieze depicting scenes from the lives of Saints Felix and Maurus. In the crypt a stone sarcophagus of the titular saint is preserved behind iron grilles.

=== Convent of Santa Croce ===
The convent of Santa Croce was built in the 13th century. The blessed Cristina, a Franciscan tertiary, lived there in the 14th century. Abandoned, it was rebuilt in 1610. It was under the patronage of the Lateran Basilica and was attributed to the Franciscan order.

=== Other churches ===
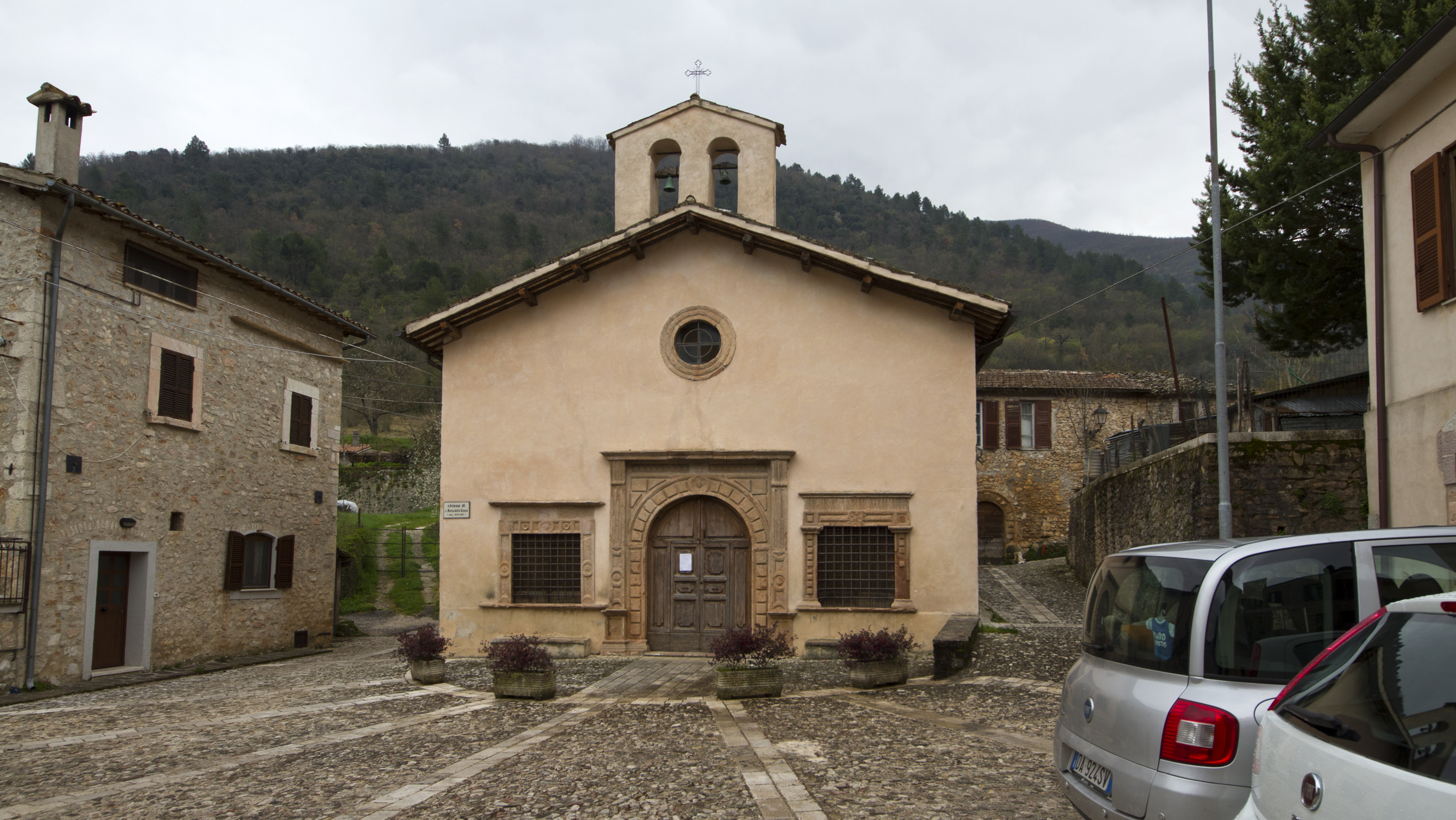
Madonna delle Grazie, Sant'Anatolia di Narco

The church of the Madonna delle Grazie stands about 19 metres (62 ft) outside the castle near the Porta superiore.

Approximately 0.25 miles (0.40 km) to the north, along the road, there is a small church dedicated to the Virgin Mary, formerly the parish church (pieve), which retains that designation.

=== Other cultural sites ===
The castle that dominates the town dates back to 1198, while the walls, featuring two 15th-century towers, were built between the 13th or 14th century.

Since 2008, Sant'Anatolia has been home to the Museo della Canapa, which is housed in the 16th-century town hall and is one of the branches of the Umbrian Apennine Ridge Eco-museum. The museum presents documentation on the entire cycle of hemp production and processin. It also preserves textile collections dating from the 17th to the 20th centuries.

== Notable people ==
Among other people, Sant'Anatolia di Narco is the birthplace of Giuseppe Campani, an astronomer and maker of scientific instruments, and Matteo Campani-Alimenis, an inventor and priest active in the seventeenth century.
