= Francesco Eschinardi =

Italian mathematician

Reverend Francesco Eschinardi
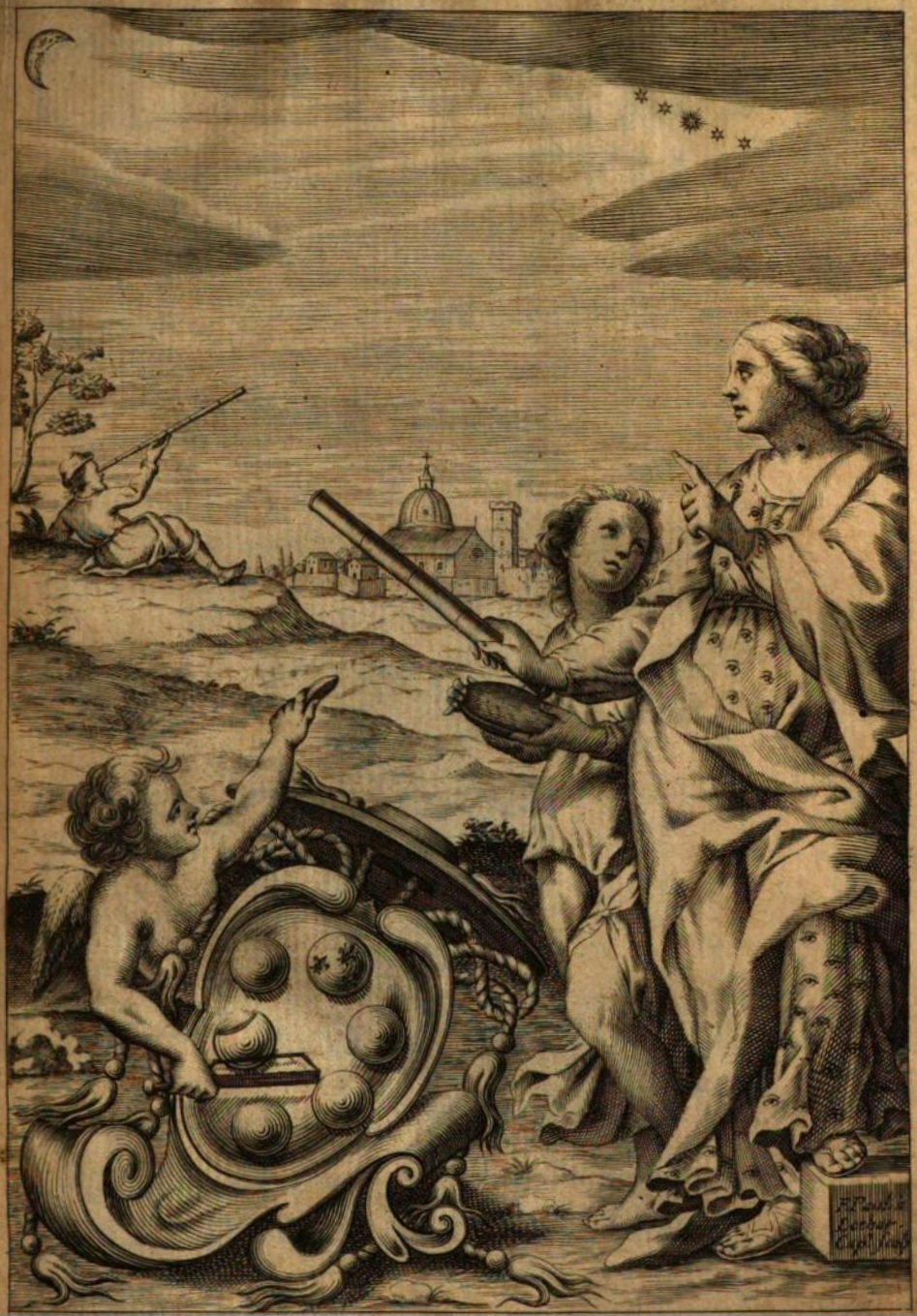
- Titlepage of Eschinardi's Centuria Problematum Opticorum, Rome, 1666
- Born: 13 December 1623; Rome, Papal States
- Died: 12 January 1703 (aged 79); Rome, Papal States
- Other name: Costanzo Amichevoli
- Occupations: Jesuit priest, university teacher, mathematician, physicist
- Known for: Development of the thermometer
- Parent: Pietro Eschinardi

Academic background
- Influences: Copernicus; Galilei; Borelli

Academic work
- Discipline: Optics, astronomy, experimental physics
- Institutions: Roman College
- Notable students: Filippo Bonanni; Francesco Valesio

Francesco Eschinardi, (also known under the pseudonym Costanzo Amichevoli; 13 December 1623 – 12 January 1703), was an Italian Jesuit, physicist and mathematician.

== Life ==
Eschinardi was born in Rome on 13 December 1623. He entered the Society of Jesus in 1637 at the age of 14 and subsequently joined the faculty of the Roman College, teaching logic in 1658, physics in 1659, and metaphysics in 1660. Traveling extensively, he taught at various Jesuit seminaries and Italian universities. He became professor of mathematics in Florence and at Perugia, then from 1665 he was again teaching at the Roman College, where he held the chair of mathematics, geometry and astronomy. He was Filippo Bonanni's tutor and Giuseppe Campani's scientific mentor.

Eschinardi had a solid scientific background and knowledge of the works of the proponents of the ‘new science’, from Copernicus to Galilei and Borelli. He was concerned with a great number of scientific projects, ranging from the physics of sound to perpetual motion, and he also was involved with attempting to graduate thermometers on a scientific principle. He was also a skilled astronomer who carried out much valuable work. From his observatory at the Roman College, he was the first to observe the great comet of 1668. Together with Marco Antonio Cellio and Giuseppe Pontio, Eschinardi was one of the first to see the great comet of 1680 on 17 November while observing the moons of Jupiter to determine longitudes. Cassini received the observations of the comet from Eschinardi while Edmond Halley was in Paris in the first weeks of 1681, and in the autumn of 1681 Halley met Eschinardi in Rome, where he learnt at first hand of the observations. Eschinardi had a deep interest in the archaeology of Rome and the conversations between the two probably stimulated the interest in Roman archaeology that led to some of Halley's papers in Philosophical Transactions.

Eschinardi was an active member of the Physical-Mathematical Academy founded by Giovanni Ciampini and contributed regularly to the Giornale de' Letterati from 1668 to 1675. He often collaborated with his fellow Jesuits Athanasius Kircher and Mario Bettinus. Bettinus' Apiaria universae philosophiae mathematicae, published in 1648, included an appendix describing a water clock (horologium hydraulicum) invented by Eschinardi. He died in Rome on 12 January 1703.

== Contributions ==
Eschinardi was one of the great Jesuit experimentalists of the latter half of the Seventeenth century. Though still tied to certain traditional patterns, especially in astronomy with the reaffirmation of the geocentric theory, he showed a sincere admiration for the innovative work of modern scholars and the desire to follow in their footsteps by using the experimental method.

In 1680 Eschinardi published an account of experiments, many of which he designed and analyzed, performed at the Physical-Mathematical Academy (Raguagli ... dati ad un'amico in Parigi [G. D. Cassini] sopra alcuni pensieri sperimentali proposti nell'Accademia Fisicomatematica di Roma. Rome: Tinassi, 1680). Almost half of the Raguagli deals with traditional mechanical subjects, like load-bearing wheels (the principles of carriages being a chief interest of Ciampini's), the operation of the rudder, and the improvement of clocks. Eschinardi follows Galileo's lead in mechanics in most respects, including the kinematics of free fall and projectile motion. The Raguagli report various plans and results, for example, a proposal by Ciampini to build in Rome a great sundial for the exact observation of the solstices and equinoxes, as Cassini had done in Bologna, a project later accomplished by Francesco Bianchini on commission from Pope Clement XI. For the rest, Eschinardi's work discusses all the current problems in observational astronomy: how best to determine atmospheric refraction, observe eclipses, measure the moon's libration, diversify gnomonics, and so on. Following Borelli, he maintains an anti-Aristotelian position that explains the condensation and rarefaction of air as the outcome of the motions of corpuscles having the shape of small spirals. He also states that, thanks to the presence of minute empty spaces, they are able to undergo contraction and dilatation. The Raguagli discuss also physical problems, including the improvement and use of thermometers, and Torricelli's experiment.

Eschinardi showed a keen interest in geography and engineering. In his “Speech on the cutting of the Isthmus between the Red Sea and the Mediterranean” delivered in 1680 at the Physical-Mathematical Academy, Eschinardi explored the idea of a proto-Suez Canal between the Mediterranean and the Red Sea. As a geographer, he mapped the Ager Romanus. Eschinardi was also the first to provide information about the nocturnal projection clock invented by Matteo Campani-Alimenis.

Historians of science today emphasize the importance of Eschinardi's work in optics and in the development of the thermometer. Eschinardi and James Gregory were engaged in a dispute regarding who was the initiator of the principle of optical equivalence.

== Works ==
- Microcosmi physicomathematici (in Latin). Vol. 1. Perugia: Tipografia episcopale. 1658.
- De sono pneumatico (in Latin). Rome. 1672.
- Regola di tramutare il tempo ordinario degli oriuoli in pendolo (in Italian). Rome: Nicolò Angelo Tinassi. 1672.
- Architettura civile (in Italian). Terni: Bernardino Arnazzini. 1675.
- Ragguagli dati ad un amico in Parigi sopra alcuni pensieri sperimentabili proposti nell'accademia fisicomatematica di Roma (in Italian). Rome: Nicolò Angelo Tinassi. 1680.
- Lettera al signor Francesco Redi nella quale si contengono alcuni discorsi fisicomatematici (in Italian). Rome: Nicolò Angelo Tinassi. 1681.
- Architettura militare (in Italian). Rome: Angelo Bernabò. 1684.
- Cursus Physicomathematicus (in Latin). Vol. 1. Rome: Johannes Jacobus Komarek. 1689.
- Descrizione di Roma e dell'agro romano (in Italian). Rome: Domenico Francioli. 1750 [1696].

== Sources ==
- Muccillo, Maria (1993). "ESCHINARDI, Francesco". Dizionario Biografico degli Italiani (in Italian). Vol. 43: Enzo–Fabrizi. Rome: Istituto dell'Enciclopedia Italiana. pp. 273–274. ISBN 978-88-12-00032-6.
- Fazzari, Michela (2007). "Incredibili visioni: Roma e i microscopi alla fine del '600". In Dario Generali; Marc J. Ratcliff (eds.). From Makers to Users. Microscopes, Markets and Scientific Practices in the Seventeenth and Eighteenth Centuries – Dagli artigiani ai naturalisti. Microscopi, offerta dei mercati e pratiche scientifiche nei secoli XVII e XVIII. Florence: Olschki. pp. 3–42. doi:10.1400/178212.
- Elazar, Michael; Feldhay, Rivka (2018). "Jesuit Conceptions of Impetus After Galileo: Honoré Fabri, Paolo Casati, and Francesco Eschinardi". Emergence and Expansion of Preclassical Mechanics. Boston Studies in the Philosophy and History of Science. Vol. 270. pp. 285–323. doi:10.1007/978-3-319-90345-3_10. ISBN 978-3-319-90343-9.
- Knowles Middleton, W. E. (1975). "Science in Rome, 1675-1700, and the Accademia Fisicomatematica of Giovanni Giustino Ciampini". The British Journal for the History of Science. 8 (2): 138–154. doi:10.1017/S0007087400013972. JSTOR 4025638.
- Feldhay, Rivka; Heyd, Michael (1989). "The Discourse of Pious Science". Science in Context. 3 (1): 109–142. doi:10.1017/S0269889700000740.
- Shapiro, Alan E. (2008). "Images: Real and Virtual, Projected and Perceived, from Kepler to Dechales". Early Science and Medicine. 13 (3): 270–312. doi:10.1163/157338208X285044. JSTOR 20617731.
- Ciancio, Luca; Romagnani, Gian Paolo (2010). Unità del sapere, molteplicità dei saperi: Francesco Bianchini (1662-1729), tra natura, storia e religione. Verona: QuiEdit. pp. 60–61. ISBN 978-8864640648.
