= Eugenio Lo Sardo =

Italian curator

Eugenio Lo Sardo (born 1954) is a professor, scholar, archivist and curator. Director of the Rome State Archives (2009–2014), and subsequently of the Italian National Archives (2014–2018), he has curated a number of major exhibitions. His prime area of interest is the history of European civilization at its origins and at its borders (his current research on Alexander the Great and the East involves both).

== Exhibitions ==
The origins of European civilisation is a major theme in his work: Lo Sardo curated and edited the catalogues for: Eureka: il genio degli Antichi (National Archaeological Museum of Naples, 2006) and Apoteosi - da uomini a dei (Apotheosis: From Mortal to Immortal, Museum of Castel Sant'Angelo 2013). He is now preparing a third with the provisional title Alexander the Great and the Orient: Conquest and Wonder.

His study of borders is a second major theme: he has worked on the Jesuit missionaries to China, and the discovery of the geographical and philosophical studies of Michele Ruggieri, S.J., responsible for the translation of the First book of Confucius. Ruggieri's Atlante can be found in all the major libraries of the world and was republished in Macao. At the Museum of Macao Lo Sardo curated the exhibition Journey to the End of the World (2014, with its catalogue in Chinese, Portuguese and English). In India, he supervised the re-publication of the Itinerary of Ludovico de Varthema and curated four exhibitions in Goa, Delhi, Kolkata, and Mumbai.

In the same vein, in 2001 he curated the exhibition Athanasius Kircher: Il Museo del Mondo (Palazzo Venezia, Rome, 2001) dedicated to the German Jesuit Athanasius Kircher and his museum, the Kircherian Museum. On the relationship of Rome and Egypt he curated La Lupa e la Sfinge (2008, Castel Sant'Angelo), and edited their exhibition catalogues. The studies on Kircher lead to teaching for the Faculty of Letters at the University of Rome "La Sapienza", where he explored the themes of ancient iconology. The lectures were collected as Il Cosmo degli Antichi (Donzelli 2006), which has been translated into French and Greek.

As Director of the State Archive of Rome, he curated a number of exhibitions and presentations: Caravaggio una vita dal vero, (Caravaggio: A Real Life; the catalogue contains transcriptions of all the Roman archival sources on the great painter); La casa di Michelangelo a Roma (Michelangelo's House in Rome) and Michelangelo e Iacopo Galli. At the Italian National Archives, in addition to assembling documentation of great historical interest about the secret services and other Italian government agencies, he curated three exhibitions and edited their catalogues: BAR - Bellezza, Arte, Ristoro (Coffee Bar - Beauty, Art, Refreshment); La Grande Guerra - l'Italia e il Levante (The Great War - Italy and the Levant); Nuove Fonti, Storia d'Italia (The History of Italy: New Sources).

== Research ==
At the outset of his career a major research project with the University of Naples involved the Italian Enlightenment and the extraordinary figure of Gaetano Filangieri, an illustrious philosopher, a friend of Benjamin Franklin, whose ideas may well have influenced the drafting of the Constitution of the United States. On this subject he wrote three books: a general study of Naples and London in the Eighteenth Century: Napoli e Londra nel XVIII secolo, le relazioni economiche (Jovene 1991), and two specialized books on Filangieri.
