= Francesco Valesio =

Italian diarist and archeologist

- Born: 14 April 1670; Rome, Papal States
- Died: 17 May 1742 (aged 72); Rome, Papal States
- Resting place: Santa Maria in Posterula ad Ursum
- Education: Roman College; Sapienza University of Rome
- Occupation: Abbot
- Parent(s): Carlo Valois and Giovanna Valois (née Mancini)
- Writing career
- Genre: Diary
- Notable work: Diary of Rome

Francesco Valesio (14 April 1670 – 17 May 1742) was an Italian diarist and archeologist.

== Life ==
Francesco Valesio was born in Rome on 14 April 1670, to Carlo Valois, medical doctor originally from Bordeaux and Giovanna Mancini of Rome. He initiated his university studies at the Roman College, where he studied philosophy and mathematics under Antonio Baldigiani and Francesco Eschinardi. He continued the course of his studies at the Sapienza University, studying Greek under Pietro Antonio Russo, and jurisprudence under Giuseppe Carpani. He was intended for further study, but then his attention was captured by antiquity and he joined the famous “academy” of Giovanni Ciampini.

He entered the clerical state and was appointed Abbot, even if he remained always in Rome, living under somewhat reduced circumstances near San Carlo al Corso. In his home he kept a large library, which became a meeting point for small groups of scholars and antique dealers. He was a close friend of the antiquarian Philipp von Stosch. He worked as censor of hagiographies. Unlike other in his circumstance, he was not wont to flatter rich patrons.

His main interests were archeology (he published an essay with title Spiegazione di alcune statue del Campidoglio, i.e. explanation of some statues of Campidoglio) and history (he published Memorie istoriche della città di Corneto, i.e. historical memories of the Etruscan town of Tarquinia).

His most important work is the Diario di Roma, a diary of the everyday events in Rome which runs from 9 August 1700 to 10 March 1711 and from 24 December 1724 to 27 March 1742, two months before his death. Pope Benedict XIV on 2 September 1745 ordered that the manuscripts with his diary were conserved in the Archivi del Popolo Romano.

Other works of him are Museum Cortonense about the ancient times of the town of Cortona and a new edition of the work of Fioravante Martinelli Roma ricercata nel svo sito con tutte le curiosità, che in essa si ritrouano, tanto antiche, come moderne which contains uncommon facts and places of Rome.

He died on 17 May 1742 in Rome and was buried in the church of S. Maria in Posterula. A distinct unrelated Francesco Valesio served as physician for King Phillip II of Spain.

== Works ==
- Museum cortonense. Rome: Fausto Amidei. 1750.
- Gli Atti de gloriosi martiri Felice e Adauto. Rome: Giovanni Maria Salvioni. 1733.
- Roma ricercata nel suo sito, con tutte le curiosità. Rome: Giovanni Francesco Buagni. 1699.
