= Cipriano Di Divini =

Italian painter

Cipriano Divini (16 September 1603 – 4 February 1686) was an Italian painter of the Baroque period.

== Biography ==
He was born in San Severino Marche. His brother, Eustachio Divini, became a famous manufacturer of optic glass in Rome.

He painted a Marriage of St Catherine of Alexandria (1662) for the church of this titular saint in Sanseverino. He also painted for the church of San Valentino (1636) in Castel di Lago and the church of Madonna del Piano (1645) near Gubbio.
