= Campani compound microscope =

The Campani compound microscope is a microscope on exhibit at the Museo Galileo in Italy, thought to have been built by optical instrument maker Giuseppe Campani in the second half 17th century. For a time it was thought to have been built by Italian scientist Galileo Galilei but no longer bares that attribution.

== Description ==
This Museo Galileo microscope is a compound microscope made of cardboard, leather and wood, and is inserted in an iron support with three curved legs. The outer tube is covered in green vellum decorated with gold tooling. There are three lenses (an objective lens, a field lens, and an eyepiece), all double-convex. The objective measures 11 mm in diameter and has a thickness of 3.5 mm. The glass is clear with few imperfections; the edge is ground and there are some fine chips. The field lens (diameter 30 mm, thickness 4.7 mm) is in a cell that pushes into the bottom of the inner tube. The glass is amber-green, with air bubbles, and has a ground edge that is chipped; the eyepiece, with an aperture of 24 mm, also has some bubbles; it is protected by a wooden cap that screws onto the mount. The instrument is attributed to Giuseppe Campani, an Italian optician and astronomer who lived in Rome during the latter half of the 17th century, known as an expert lens grinder and instrument maker. Compound microscopes such as this first appeared in Europe around 1620 including one demonstrated by Cornelis Drebbel in London (around 1621) and one exhibited in Rome in 1624.

The instrument was said to have been built by Galileo but no longer bares that attribution. Galileo was known for using his 1609 telescope, which used a concave eyepiece and a convex objective, either forwards of backwards to view small objects, such as flies, close up but it was not a very practical microscope. After seeing the compound microscope built by Cornelis Drebbel exhibited in Rome in 1624 that used two convex lenses, Galileo built his own improved version. Giovanni Faber, fellow of the Accademia dei Lincei, gave the name "microscope" (microscopio) to Galileo's "small eyeglass" (occhialino) in 1625.

== Bibliography ==
- Mara Miniati, ed. (1991). Museo di storia della scienza: catalogo (in Italian). Firenze: Giunti. p. 120, board n. 2. ISBN 88-09-20036-5.
- Gerard E. Turner, ed. (1991). Catalogue of microscopes (in Italian). Firenze: Giunti. p. 26, board n. 2. ISBN 88-09-20208-2.

== Sources ==
- Edward, G. Ruestow. The microscope in the Dutch Republic: the shaping of discovery. Cambridge University Press, Jan 22, 2004
