= Filippo Bonanni =

Italian scholar and writer (1638–1723)

Reverend Filippo Bonanni
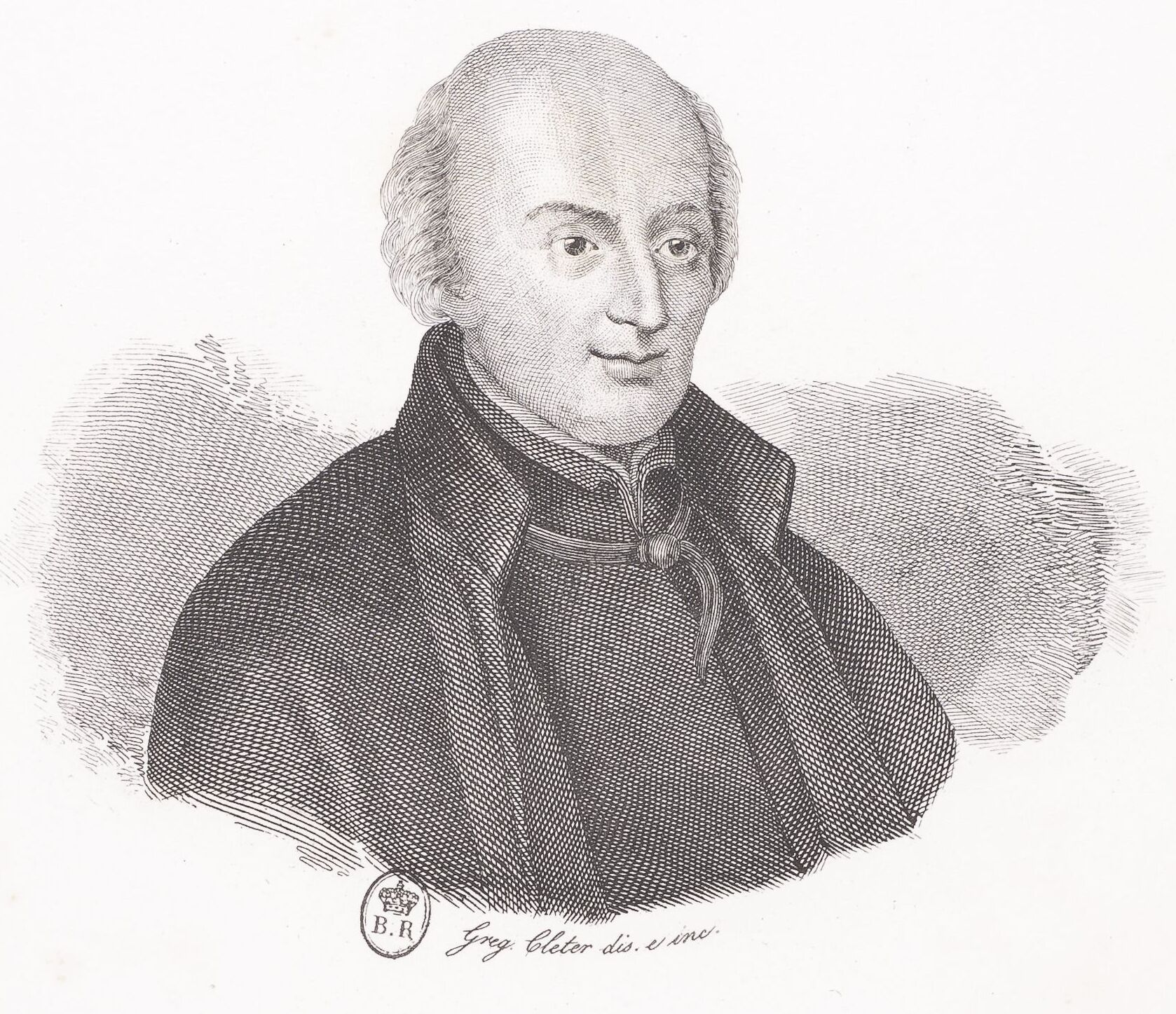
- Engraved portrait of Filippo Bonanni
- Born: January 7, 1638; Rome, Papal States
- Died: 30 March 1723 (aged 85); Rome, Papal States
- Occupations: Jesuit priest, university teacher, naturalist, physicist
- Known for: Being one of the founding fathers of conchology
- Parent: Lodovico Bonanni

Academic background
- Education: Roman College
- Doctoral advisor: Francesco Eschinardi
- Influences: Aristotle; Galilei; Kircher; Fabri

Academic work
- Discipline: Natural science, biology, optics
- Sub-discipline: Conchology; Lens manufacturing
- Institutions: Kircherian Museum
- Notable students: Raimondo di Sangro

Filippo Bonanni; S.J. or Buonanni (7 January 1638 – 30 March 1723) was an Italian Jesuit scholar. His many works included treatises on fields ranging from anatomy to music. He created the earliest practical illustrated guide for shell collectors in 1681, for which he is considered a founder of conchology. He also published a study of lacquer that has been of lasting value since his death.

== Life ==
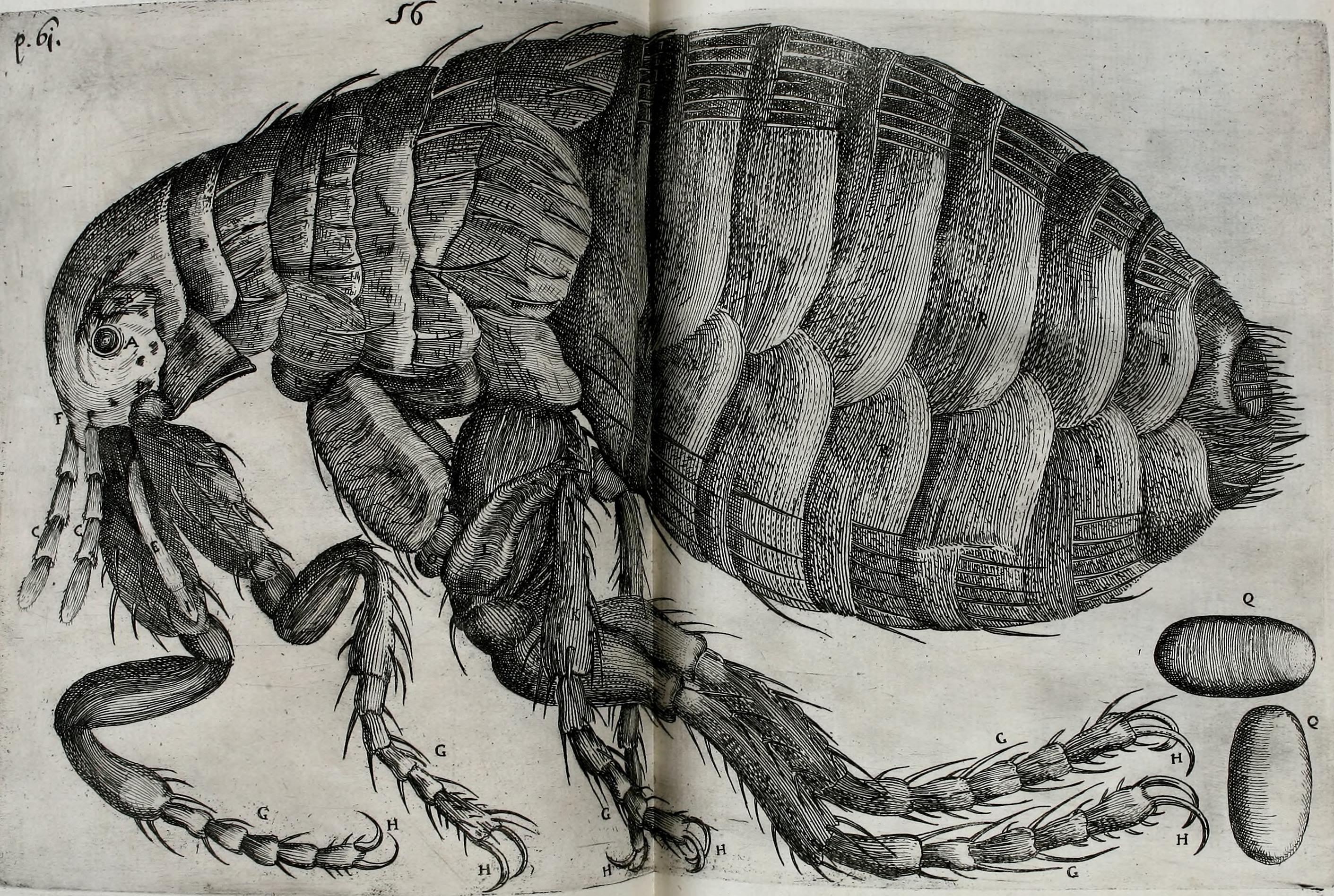
Flea drawn by Buonanni (1691).

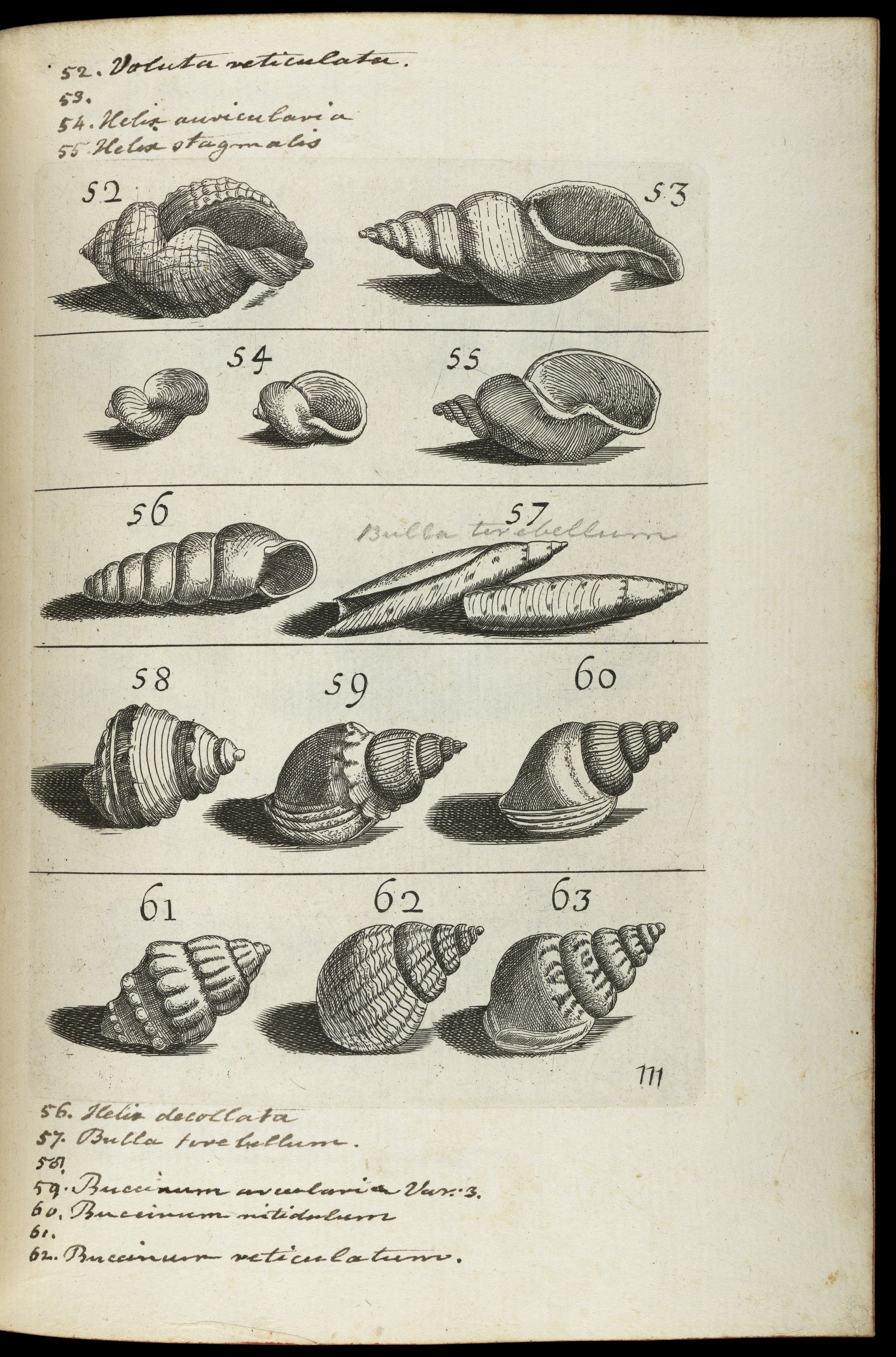
Sea shells from Recreatione dell'occhio e della mente

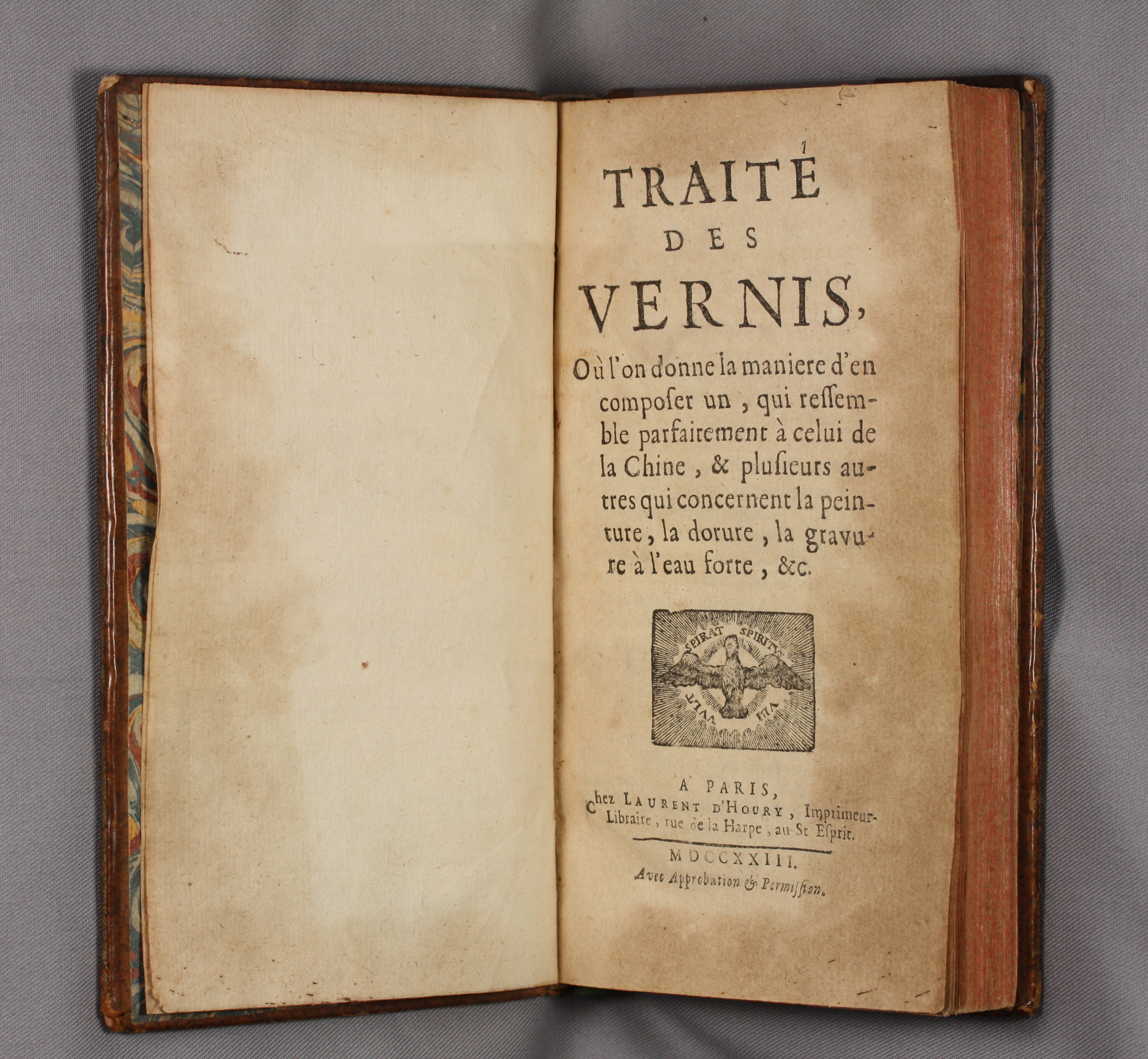
French translation of Trattato sopra la vernice

Bonanni was born in Rome in 1638, and entered the Society of Jesus in 1654, when he was still 17 years old. After his novitiate, in 1656, he was sent to study at the Society's noted Roman College. There, he became a pupil of the German scientist, Athanasius Kircher. While a student there, he undertook the manufacturing of microscopic lenses. He used his lenses to create his own microscope and to develop scientific studies of a number of specimens. He also became a skilled copper plate engraver.

From Rome, Bonanni was sent to teach in the Jesuit Colleges of Orvieto and Ancona. Upon Kircher's resignation of the post of Professor of Mathematics at the Roman College, Bonanni was chosen to succeed him. In 1698, years after Kircher's death (1680), Bonanni was appointed curator of the well-known collection installed in the Roman College, which had been under Kircher's care up to that point. The Roman College asked Buonanni to take on the project of publishing a catalogue of Kircher's museum. After ten years work, he published the Musaeum Kircherianum (1709), a large folio volume that listed all of the objects in the collection and illustrated many of them. The catalogue is divided into twelve sections (Classes) concerning the various categories of objects. The antiquities occupy the first five sections and are collected in ethnographic criteria.

Bonanni followed Aristotle in believing in theories of spontaneous generation. In critiquing the experimental work of Francesco Redi, Bonanni defended the Aristotelian view. Though he raised important questions—such as whether viewers through a microscope tended to see what they expected, rather than what was there—later writers tended to discount Bonanni as support for Aristotelianism waned.

Nonetheless, in early writing about the nature and origins of fossils, Bonanni admitted doubts about whether theories of transport could account for the numbers and distribution of fossils. He later speculated that fossils could be divided into two groups—the remains of organisms, and the "products of natural powers." Such interpretations were consistent with the new and challenging idea that the earth must have undergone "extraordinary alterations" to explain the diversity of types and locations of fossils.

=== Conchology ===
Bonanni created the earliest practical illustrated guide for shell collectors, Recreatione dell'occhio e della mente (1681). The two-volume guide was the first treatise devoted entirely to molluscs and included numerous engravings. Bonanni's work is significant for his careful attempts to precisely describe shell morphology. Due to the printing and engraving process, the spirals shown on the shells were reversed from dextral to sinistral, a mirror image problem that later books avoided. Zoological taxonomies of the time were based on visual characteristics, and Bonanni paid special attention to both form and color, and showed details (sometimes fanciful) of the creatures inside the shells. Although his work predated the adoption of Linnaeus' system of binomial nomenclature (genus + species), Bonanni laid the foundation for the new discipline of conchology. Several later Linnaean names were based on Bonanni's work, including the name of the class Bivalvia, which he introduced.

=== Lacquer ===
Among other topics, Bonanni wrote of the ingredients craftsmen in China used to make the lacquer they used on porcelain, a popular import item for Europe at the time. Like other researchers of the day, he went on to experiment with various recipes to recreate the lacquer used on porcelain and furniture. In 1720, Bonanni published his studies in Trattato sopra la vernice detta communemente cinese (1720), or Treatise on the Varnish commonly called Chinese. This work was republished repeatedly over the next century in several languages, and was re-issued in 1994 in its original Italian version.

== Scientific work ==
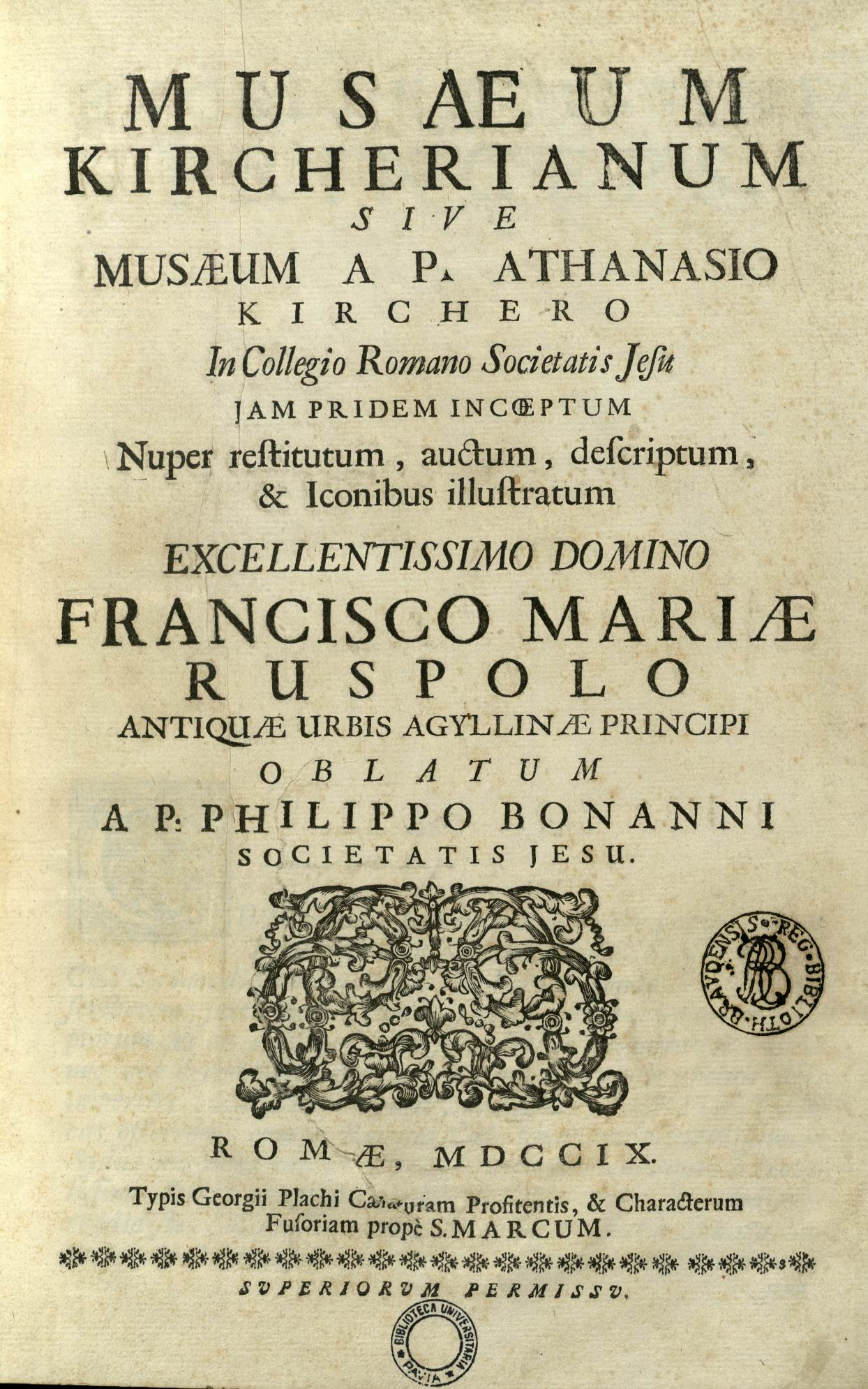
Musaeum Kircherianum, 1709

Bonanni made excellent observations, which are embodied in several works:

- Ricreatione dell'occhio e della mente

Bonanni was a shell collector and was the author of the first book devoted solely to seashells, published in Rome in 1681. Numerous Linnaean names were based on his illustrations, listed under "Bonan. recr."

- Observationes circa Viventia, quae in Rebus non Viventibus

Using a three lens microscope, in this work published in 1691 Bonanni tried to show that spontaneous generation was possible in animals "without blood and a heart", in contradiction of Francesco Redi’s experimental work. The compilation of knowledge and quality of the illustrations made this an important work.

- Numismata Pontificum Romanorum

A two-volume study started in 1696 and completed in 1702 of the coins issued by the papacy over the centuries.

- Musæum Kircherianum, sive Musaeum a P. Athanasio Kirchero in Collegio Romano Societatis Jesu... descriptum

The catalogue of Kircher's collection (1709).

- Trattato sopra la vernice detta communemente Cinese

His work on lacquer, published 1720.

- Gabinetto Armonico pieno d'istromenti sonori

First issued in 1722 and reprinted in 1723, the collection comprises 152 engravings of musical instruments from around the world.

=== Publications ===
- Ricreatione dell'occhio e della mente nell'osservation delle chiocciole (in Italian). Varese: Felice Cesaretti. 1681.
- Observationes circa viventia, quae in rebus non viventibus reperiuntur (in Latin). Roma: Domenico Antonio Ercole. 1691.
- Micrographia curiosa (in Latin). Roma: Antonio De Rossi. 1703.
- Musaeum Kircherianum (in Latin). Roma: Giorgio Placho. 1709.
- Ordinum equestrium, et militarium catalogus (in Latin and Italian). Roma: Giorgio Placeo. 1711.
- Rerum naturalium historia (in Latin). Roma: Giovanni Zempel. 1782.

== Bibliography ==
- "Elogio di P. Philippo Buonanni". Giornale de' letterati d'Italia. XXXVII: 326–388. 1725.
- Neviani, Antonio (1935). "Un episodio della lotta fra spontaneisti ed ovulisti. Il Padre Filippo Buonanni e l'Abate Anton Felice Marsili". Rivista di storia delle scienze mediche e naturali. 26: 211–232.
- Ghirardini, Cristina (2008). "Filippo Bonanni's Gabinetto armonico and the antiquiarians' writings on musical instruments". Music in Art: International Journal for Music Iconography. 33 (1/2): 168–234. JSTOR 41818565.
- Harrison, Frank Ll.; Rimmer, Joan, eds. (1964). Antique Musical Instruments and Their Players. 152 Plates from Bonanni's 18th Century "Gabinetto Armonico". New York: Dover Publications. ISBN 0-486-21179-7.
- Hilpert, Gisela, Filippo Bonanni und seine Gabinetto armonico, Diss., Leipzig 1945.
- Mazzucchelli, Giammaria (1763). "BUONANNI (Filippo)". Gli scrittori d'Italia, cioè notizie storiche e critiche intorno alle vite e agli scritti dei letterati italiani. Vol. 2, part 4. Brescia: G. Bossini. pp. 2329–2333.
- Nicéron, Jean-Pierre (1734). Mémoires pour servir à l'histoire des hommes illustres dans la rèpublique des lettres. Vol. XXX. pp. 22–30.
- Mandosio, Prospero (1682). Bibliotheca romana, seu Romanorum scriptorum centuriae. Vol. II. Rome. pp. 297 ff.
- Manget, Jean-Jacques (1731). Bibliotheca scriptorum medicorum veterum et recentiorum. Vol. I. Geneva. pp. 349–52.
- Sommervogel, Carlos. Bibliothèque de la Compagnie de Jèsus. Vol. II. pp. 376–384.
- Fazzari, Michela (1999). "Redi, Buonanni e la controversia sulla generazione spontanea: una rilettura". In W. Bernardi; L. Guerrini (eds.). Francesco Redi. Un protagonista della scienza moderna. Florence: Olschki. pp. 97–127.
- Fazzari, Michela (2004). "Filippo Buonanni: un caso di invisibilità creata dai contemporanei, ovvero come si diventa invisibili". In M.T. Monti; M.J. Ratcliff (eds.). Figure dell'Invisibilità. Le scienze della vita nell'Italia dell'Antico Regime. Florence: Olschki. pp. 21–82. doi:10.1400/48300.
- Nicoli Aldini, Rinaldo (2004). "Filippo Bonanni et ses observations microscopiques sur les psoques (Insecta: Psocoptera) dans la deuxième moitié du XVIIe siècle". In A.N. Garcìa Aldrete; C. Lienhard; E.L. Mockford (eds.). Thorntoniana. A commemorative volume for Ian W. B. Thornton. Mexico: Universidad Nacional Autónoma de México. pp. 49–64.
- La Perna, Rafael (2005). "I «problemi» malacologici di Filippo Buonanni (1638-1725)" (PDF). Bollettino Malacologico. 41 (9–12): 102–110.
- Nicoli Aldini, Rinaldo (2020). "Albori di Entomologia merceologica e urbana nell'opera del microscopista Filippo Bonanni (1638-1725)". In E. Mazzoni; R. Nicoli Aldini (eds.). Atti del 10° Simposio "La difesa antiparassitaria nelle industrie alimentari e la protezione degli alimenti". Pinerolo: Chiriotti Editori. pp. 245–246. ISBN 978-88-96027-52-3.
