= Abbey of San Felice and Mauro =

Religious building in Castel San Felice, Italy

Coordinates: 42.741896°N 12.841648°E

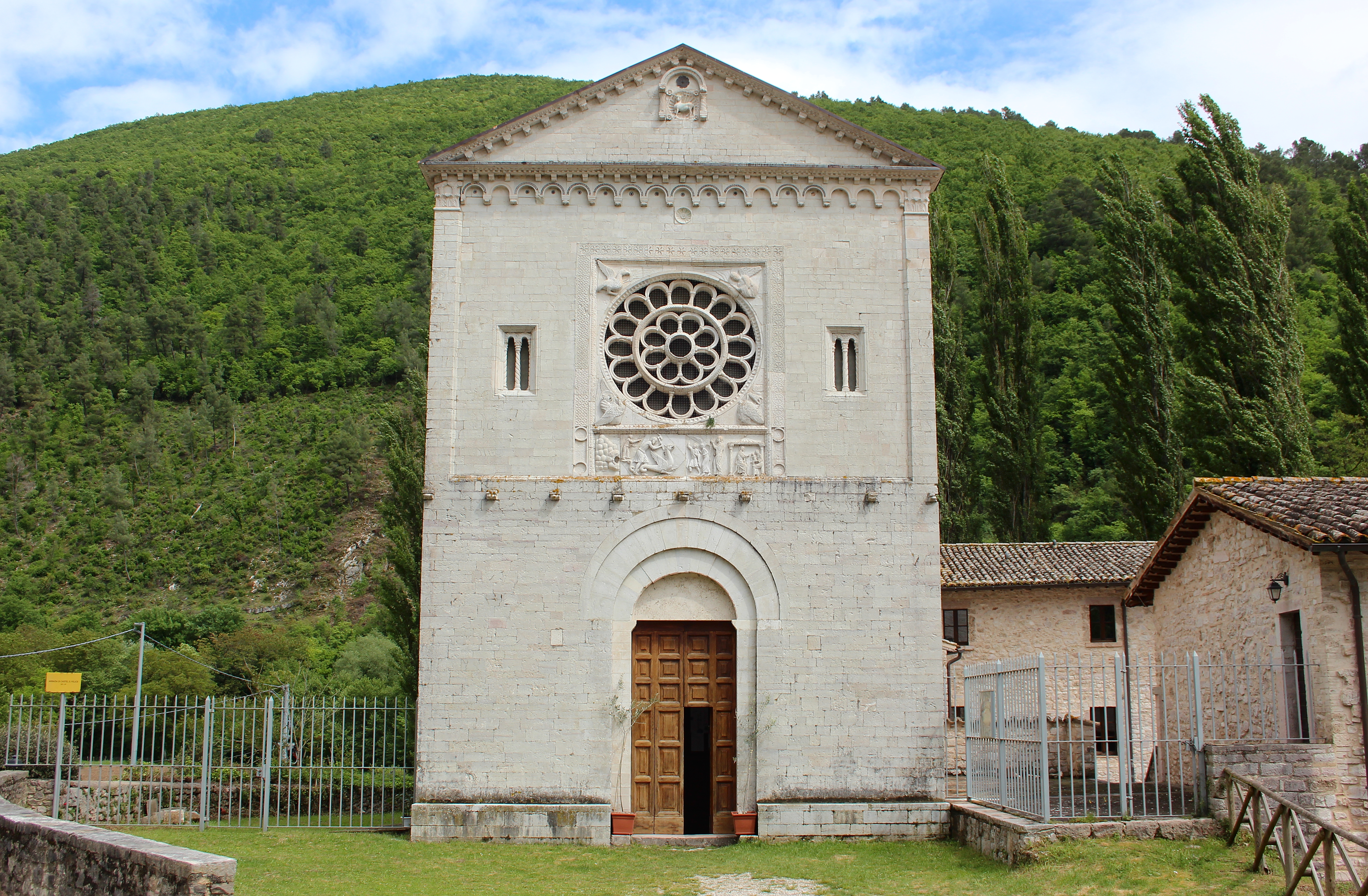
Facade of the church of San Felice and Mauro

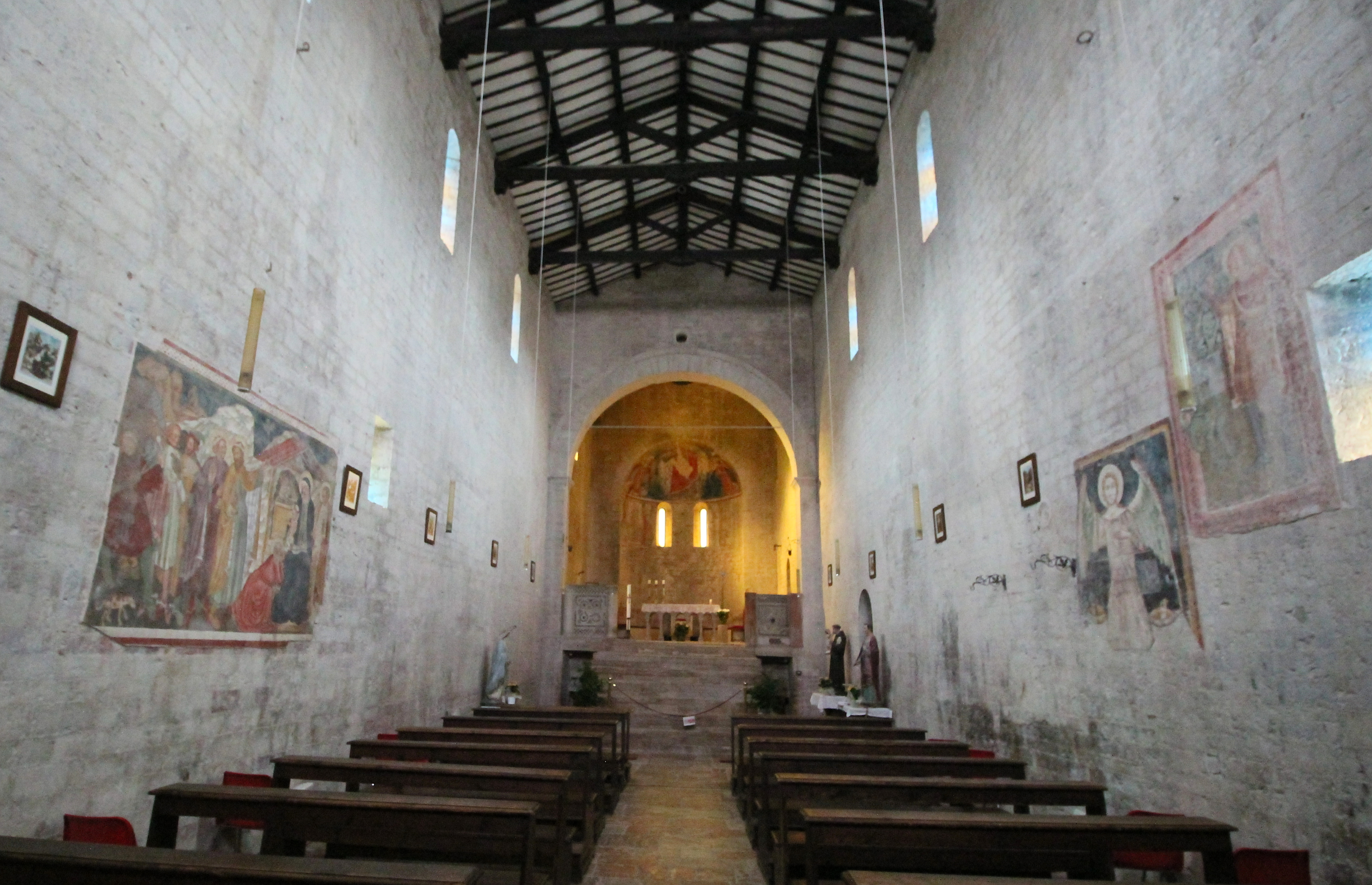
Interior of the church of San Felice and Mauro

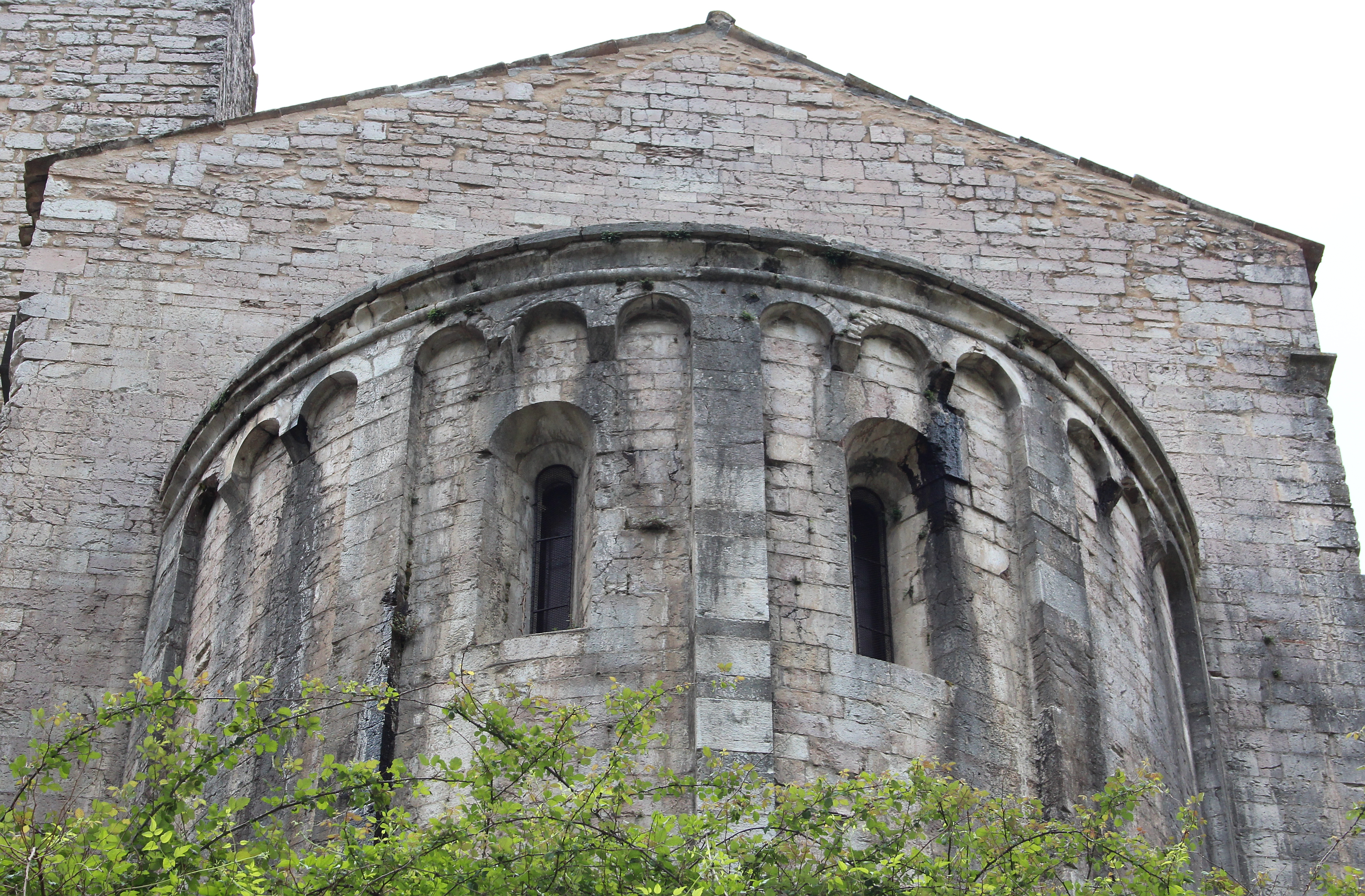
Romanesque apse of the church of San Felice and Mauro

The Abbey of San Felice e Mauro is a Roman Catholic complex including what is now the rural parish church of San Felice, a Romanesque and Gothic-style former monastery church, and the attached abbey, a former Benedictine monastery, now a rural inn and restaurant. The abbey is located just outside the hillside hamlet of Castel San Felice, which is less than a kilometer north of the small town of Sant'Anatolia di Narco. The valley area known as the Valenerina is located a handful of kilometers east of Spoleto, in the Province of Perugia, region of Umbria, Italy.

== History and description ==
A Benedictine monastery appears to have been established here by the 12th-century; tradition holds that Saint Maurus, a 4th-century Roman soldier from Syria, left with his son, Felix, to move to this area of Italy, perhaps practicing an eremitic life in caves in nearby mountains. Legend also hold that, like St George, Maurus slew a dragon that had unleashed terror on the community. Legend also holds that his son Felix, with angelic help miraculously resurrected a dead child. When Felix died, his father built a small chapel to house his tomb.

The structures we see now underwent various reconstructions over the centuries. The church, in ruins by 1530 was restored by a wealthy noble from Spoleto. In 1922, the church was stripped of the Baroque additions and restored to highlight its original construction.

Like many churches in this part of Umbria, the façade has Gothic elements with a rose window and two flanking mullioned windows. Around the rose window are the symbols of the four evangelists. Below this window, is a decorative sculpted frieze, that appear to be spolia from an earlier church; it displays two scenes: one of St Maurus axing a dragon and the second includes St Felix healing a child in a mother's lap. The portal has rounded arches. The interior has a robust colonnade forming three naves. The naves have some 15th-century frescoes. From the outside, the semicircular Romanesque apse is evident. At the presbytery, steps lead down to a heavily vaulted crypt with a small ancient sarcophagus the putatively held the relics of Felix.

The stone former abbey has a small courtyard and is near a small ancient bridge over the river Nera. On the hill-side above is the once-fortified hamlet of Castel San Felice.
