= Eustachio Divini =

- Portrait of Eustachio Divini in Dioptrica Pratica by Carlo Antonio Manzini, Bologna 1660
- Born: 4 October 1610; San Severino Marche, Papal States
- Died: 22 February 1685 (aged 74); San Severino Marche, Papal States
- Era: Scientific Revolution
- Known for: Optical instrument making
- Scientific career
- Fields: Optics; Mechanics; Astronomy
- Academic advisors: Benedetto Castelli

Eustachio Divini (4 October 1610 – 22 February 1685) was an Italian manufacturer and experimenter of optical instruments for scientific use in Rome.

== The origins ==
Eustachio was born on 4 October 1610 in San Severino Marche, from the illustrious Divini's family. At the age of four his mother, Virginia Saracini, died and seven years later his father, Tardozzo Divini, also died, so his brothers Vincenzo and Cipriano looked after him and his basic education before moving to Rome. At that time Divini was initiated into the military career but after a severe disease in 1629 he had to give up. After that he joined again his brothers.

== The Roman career ==
His brother Vincenzo, who frequented the literary and scientific circle in Rome, incited him to follow the lessons of monk Benedetto Castelli, disciple of Galilei. So Eustachio began his new fertile formative experience with people of his same generation such as Evangelista Torricelli, Giovanni Alfonso Borelli, Bonaventura Cavalieri and Michelangelo Ricci. In the early 1640s Divini practiced as a clock-maker. Subsequently, his good relationship and friendship with Torricelli led him to cultivate a shared interest, the construction of optical instruments, microscopes and telescopes and their improvement. Divini's factory of instruments was located in the area of Navona square in Rome, and it is very probable that quite a high number of artisans (mechanics, glassmakers, tanners etc.) where working under Divini's direction. Since 1646 to about mid-century his lenses and glasses spread all over Europe granting him the role of Italy's foremost optician.

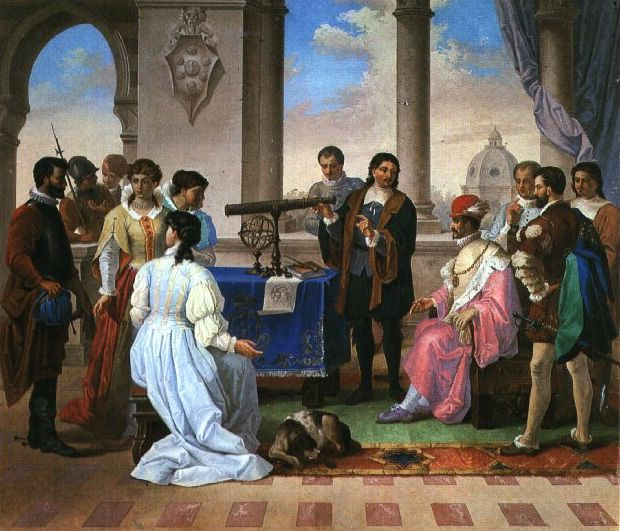
Divini at Ferdinando II de' Medici court (M. Piervittori 1884)

Many types of telescopes of various lengths were owned by prominent secular and ecclesiastic authorities in Rome. Divini's reputation and earnings were obtained not only thanks to the manufacture of optical instruments, but also thanks to the frequenting of a circle of scholars of the Roman College, where the astronomical research and the quality of the instruments of observation were both important. Differently from Francini, Galilei's artisan, this group produced new working methods and new optical systems. These discoveries were published and spread all over Europe. The Court of Medici in Florence bought many Divini's telescopes and was not only a test bench for him, but also a spreading engine for the notoriety of the optician, because of the role of the associated Accademia del Cimento in triggering astronomical research in all Europe. So it isn't a surprise that the prestigious Royal Society of London dedicated to Divini with the inscription: "Divinus Eustachius: De Sancto Severini, Insignis Mathematicus". The astronomers of the Accademia del Cimento substituted several Divini's objectives for Torricelli's lenses, obtaining a perfect combination with Divini's convex oculars and composed eyepieces. Recent tests and analysis of telescopes conserved in Florence Science Museum confirm these changes on Divini's telescopes and the better quality of Torricelli's objective lenses.

Divini's first publication was a print appeared in 1649 where he intended to document the possibilities offered by his telescopes. Indeed, at the centre he depicted a selenography derived from his observations of the full moon in March 1649, using two telescopes, and around the crescent Saturn, Venus and Jupiter. He deserved fame mainly for his use of micrometer eyepiece consisting in a grid of wires inserted in a biconvex eyepiece, thanks to which he could draw the moonspots in the exact position. A copy of that selenography was given later by Eustachio Divini to his hometown San Severino, his birth town he kept in touch continuously together with his brother Cipriano, a well-established painter in Rome.

Divini's contributes to microscope optics and mechanics, shared with Campani brothers (Giuseppe and Matteo), are unquestionable. He designed, among the others, coupled lenses to reduce chromatic aberration, devised a mirror to send light onto the specimen to be observed, and created the Vase microscope. quoted for having been used by Malpighi in his discovery of red blood cells flowing in capillaries around 1660.

Eustachio Divini re-discovered the spot, the satellites shadows and the changing shape belt upon Jupiter in 1665, with his telescopes (after the astronomer Giovanni Domenico Cassini who first used Divini's telescopes when he was living in Rome). These discoveries had permitted previously to argue out the rotation of Jupiter around its axis, whereas Divini was able to demonstrate the amateurs and astronomers community that his instruments were as effective as the ones made by his rivals, Campani brothers, manufacturer of telescopes for Cassini.

== Challenges and disputes ==
It was around the middle of seventeenth century, after the development of telescope handicraft initiated by Galilei, Francini, Fontana, Torricelli and others; that direct comparisons of telescopes – paragoni – became regular and exciting events in the Italian world of science, also hailed by the Accademia del Cimento in Florence, one of the earliest societies dedicated to the experimental method. Eustachio Divini was one of the protagonists, against his will, of these contests.

Divini's reputation as the best European maker of telescopes begun to be superseded in 1656, when Christiaan Huygens announced the discovery of a "moon" of Saturn (the satellite that was called Titan later on). The Dutch astronomer, discovered it in 1655 using his own telescopes, then followed its movements for months, seeing the satellite make a complete revolution of Saturn "arms" every sixteen days. During those months he recognized also phases of different width in the anses, the mysterious formation accompanying the planet, and reasoned that If that body had to rotate remaining attached to the planet in a few days, its appearance should have been changing shape more frequently than it did. He recognized the role of that fortuitous circumstance in permitting him to guess and declare – in 1659 – the real nature of the planet's ring. Nevertheless, while writing: "I perceive this ring very plainly with the eyes", he was underestimating the role of his insights and gestalt switch for the interpretation of what he had seen. We can interpret Huygens' worry to attribute his discovery to a visual fact as a sort of pre-defensive attitude, demonstrating that any change of the heavens based on the strongest logical reason, was still hampered by the Inquisition in that post-Galilean age.

So Huygens, in his memorial dedicated to Prince Leopold of Medici, suggested that the previous wrong interpretations as "opposite bodies" or "handle like formations" of Saturn ring were due to the inferior quality of the instruments. In the same opera Huygens attributed to Divini's silkscreen the most faithful representation of the planet in circulation, while congratulating him as "praestantissimus percillorum artifex", but he ascribed to Divini's – and criticized as intentional – the introduction of "arbitrary nonexistent shadows, darker than the sky, between the body of the planet and the "bent handles". Divini, who just wanted to represent the best that his telescopes permitted to see and not to solve astronomical queries, resented Huygens' criticism. Also Divini had noticed in 1657 the satellite of Saturn, which previously he had considered a simple fixed star. Actually, the gap of the quality of his observations wasn't big (all the instruments of that age had a resolution not better than 10'’, as to say that Saturn's ring was indeed invisible to everybody. But perhaps, as it often happens in Science, it was the availability or the insight of a good theory to allow Huygens a better representation of the whole Saturn's system. Unfortunately Huygens's attitude offended Divini and provoked a series of attacks and retorts that led to mutual insults.

As Divini was unable to write in Latin, he asked Honoré Fabri (a powerful French Jesuit anti-Copernican who lived in Rome and was user-estimator of Divini's telescopes) to translate his defense of the effectiveness of his own telescopes. But Fabri imposed on Divini by making an issue out of Huygens' avowed Copernicanism, imagining a number of light and dark satellites moving behind the planet in tight formation, in such a way to reproduce the appearance of the anses. The academicians of Cimento in Florence were involved in the quarrel receiving the Brevis annotatio in Systema Saturnium signed only by Divini. Huygens promptly replied as soon as he became aware – thanks to Pierre Guisony that was living in Rome in contact with Fabri – that Divini was preparing an offensive.

Prince Leopold, a skilled astronomer, knew that the question of telescopes was disjointed from the theoretical one, and he was yet perfectly acquainted with Divini's telescopes quality. In fact in 1660 he had viewed Saturn's shadow on its ring with a telescope made by Divini, a result that Huygens would have been looking for a long time yet. So he proposed Huygens to submit his better telescope to a test in Holland, while the same test would be done in Italy to Divini's better telescope.

Huygens did not comply, but, in September 1660, after receiving a full copy of Divini's booklet Brevis Annotatio, published a complete reply,Brevis Assertio Systematis Saturnii, once again addressed to the Prince Leopold diminishing both his opponents, and humiliating Divini with the name of "vitrarius artifex" (glassworker).

In the meanwhile Prince Leopold had built models of both hypotheses by Fabri's and Huygens' and had the academicians of Cimento observed them lighted from a distance, to decide which one was more adequate to explain Saturn's appearances. After this interesting early application of the experimental method, Huygens' ring hypothesis was decidedly preferred, as Leopold communicated to Huygens in the late 1660 (even if this decision remained unpublished to avoid diplomatic troubles).

Then, in spite of Prince Leopold's suggestion to desist, Divini and Fabri counter-replied printing a new booklet in 1661, Pro sua Annotatione in Systema Saturnium Christiani Hugenii adversus ejusdem Assertionem, signed again by Divini, where Fabri was yet reinforcing his hypothesis of multiple satellites (Saturn's companions), claiming that he and Divini could not help seeing Saturn surrounded by a ring, while Divini was suggesting a paragone, in an ironic play, with two hundred scudi bet to the challenger. Huygens, after receiving from Leopold a print copy of that second reply, rejoiced in his victory over Fabri not responding to this challenge either, being sickened by both Divini and Fabri.

The tardy back out of Fabri, who communicated to Huygens the untenableness of his theory in 1664–1665, was not at all enough to recovery Divini's reputation, severely tarnished by this episode, even because Fabri subtly justified his withdrawal to the better quality of the most recent observations with Campani's telescopes, the next rising star in lenses manufacture.

The same academy of Cimento in Florence was involved in another disputation to compare Divini's and Campani's instruments in 1664. First tests were not favourable to either of them, notwithstanding the paragoni had been carefully arranged by Matteo and Giuseppe Campani brothers to put Divini at as much of a disadvantage as possible. In the paragone of 30 April 1664 Divini used a telescope manufactured by him with a very complex optical system and previously sold to the nephew of Pope Alexander VII, Cardinal Flavio Chigi, for a very high price. Since Divini's instruments was in the possession of Cardinal Chigi, the Campani brothers were able to make all the arrangements and substitutions without notifying Divini beforehand. Then Divini arrived in the test place to find his telescope arranged on chairs and was not allowed to check the conditions of the lenses or to make any changes on it, while Campani's telescope was beautifully mounted. Divini's telescope gave a worse performance of Campani's, but Divini, rather than making excuses, admitted that Campani's instrument was better than his and begged to be allowed to make the Cardinal a better telescope to replace the manifestly defective one. This easy victory and the humiliation of Divini initiated Campani to the success. The academy of Cimento and Prince Leopold was eager to know if Campani's telescopes were, indeed, better than those of Divini that had served them so well in Florence. So they inquired that the previous paragone in Rome was unfair and commanded specially designed experiments based on the reading of texts at a distance. The first of these does not permitted to establish the winner because the competitors used different telescopes; as Campani refuted to do the experiment in Florence, the test was done in different places and times (autumn 1964), Campani moved a lamp closer to the sheet to be read, whose letters could be recognized also by insight as being made of known words and famous phrases. The Accademia of Cimento devised better criteria, more similar to nowadays ophthalmic characters tables, but in the subsequent paragoni, in the late 1664, no one's telescope was definitely declared as best performer. In 1665 the Grand Duke Ferdinand II and Prince Leopold acquired a number of Campani and new Divini telescopes and subjected them to tests of their own in astronomical observations. Sometimes no clear advantage accrued either to Campani or Divini, until in July a 50-palm Campani telescope made for Cardinal Giberto Borromeo (1615–1672) resulted to be much better than all other telescopes of similar length. Divini did not take Campani's victory well, arguing a freak or bare luck. Both the antagonists proposed to the Accademia del Cimento an impartial test based on the manufacturing of the best objective lenses with given curvature starting from the same piece of glass divided in two parts. In this way their skills as lens-makers could have been assessed, but Prince Leopold did not act on the proposal: the dispute was over and Campani was the undisputed winner. Despite the undeniable merits of Divini's telescopes, it was just one of Campani's telescopes that won the day. Rather than this single defeat, they were mainly Cassini's discoveries that promoted the products by Campani, up to the end of the century. Divini, resigned to leave the top position of his art to the antagonist, wrote with pride in 1666: "my glasses have lost nothing in these paragoni, in fact after the contest and even today I have new orders from Florence" (from letter to Carlo Antonio Manzini). There are also witnesses that as late as in 1671 lenses were commissioned to both Campani and Divini from the great Observatoire de Paris, directed by Cassini.

== Back to San Severino ==
In 1674 Eustachio Divini still lived in Rome, but at some time later he decided to return to live finally in San Severino, preceded by Vincenzo (doctor until 1670) and Cipriano, charged for important public office. He had a considerable wealth, saved during his career. This is demonstrated by Saint Lorenzo's pastor that registered Divini's death on 22 February 1685 dedicating an unusual space quoting details of the notorial act of Divini's donation. Eustachio Divini was buried in the second left chapel of San Domenico Church, close to an ancestor of him, the inlayer and woodcarver Domenico Indivini (1445?–1502).

The Technical Institute of San Severino Marche was named after the scientist Eustachio Divini in 1983, on the occasion of renewed historical studies on his scientific and technological development.

== Works ==
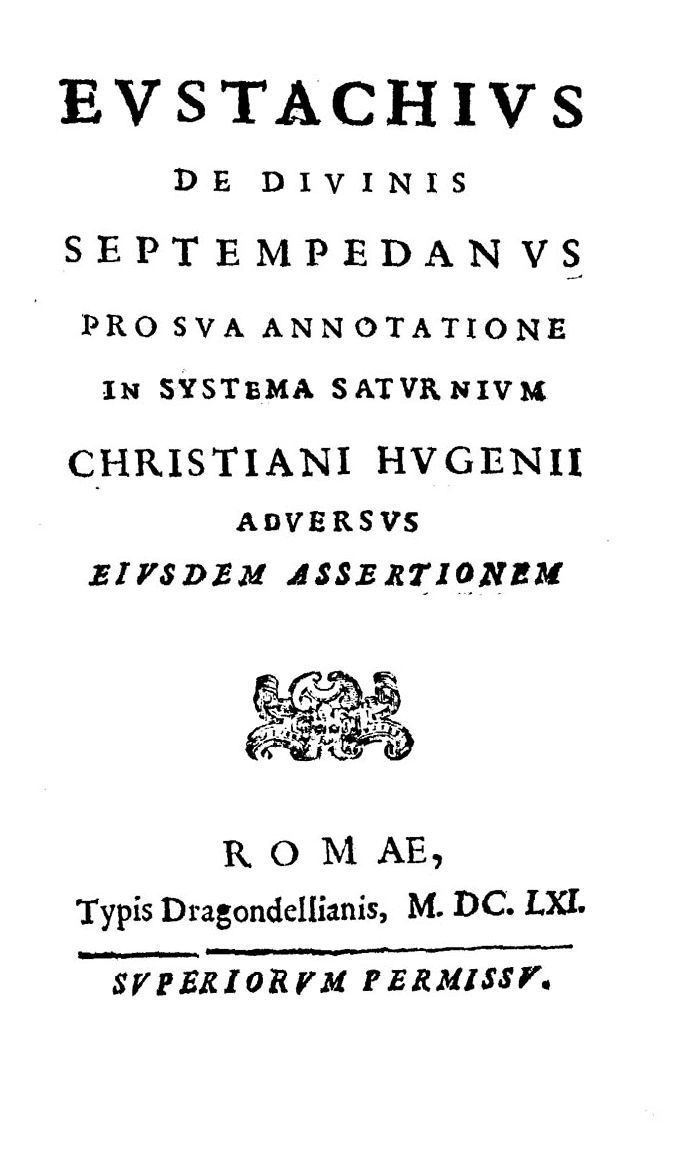
Eustachius de Diuinis Septempedanus pro sua annotatione in Systema Saturnium Christiani Hugenii aduersus eiusdem assertionem, 1661

- Brevis annotatio in systema Saturnium Christiani Eugenii (in Latin). Roma: Giacomo Dragondelli. 1660.
- Eustachius de Diuinis Septempedanus pro sua annotatione in Systema Saturnium Christiani Hugenii aduersus eiusdem assertionem (in Latin). Roma: Giacomo Dragondelli. 1661.
- Lettera all'ill.mo sig. conte Carl'Antonio Manzini. Si ragguaglia di un nuovo lauoro e componimento di lenti, che servono a occhialoni, o semplici, o composti (in Italian). Roma: Giacomo Dragondelli. 1663.
- Lettera di Eustachio Diuini. Intorno alle macchie nuouamente scoperte nel mese di luglio 1665 nel pianeta di Gioue con suoi cannocchiali (in Italian). Roma: Giacomo Dragondelli. 1666.
