= Kircherian Museum =

- Museo kircheriano
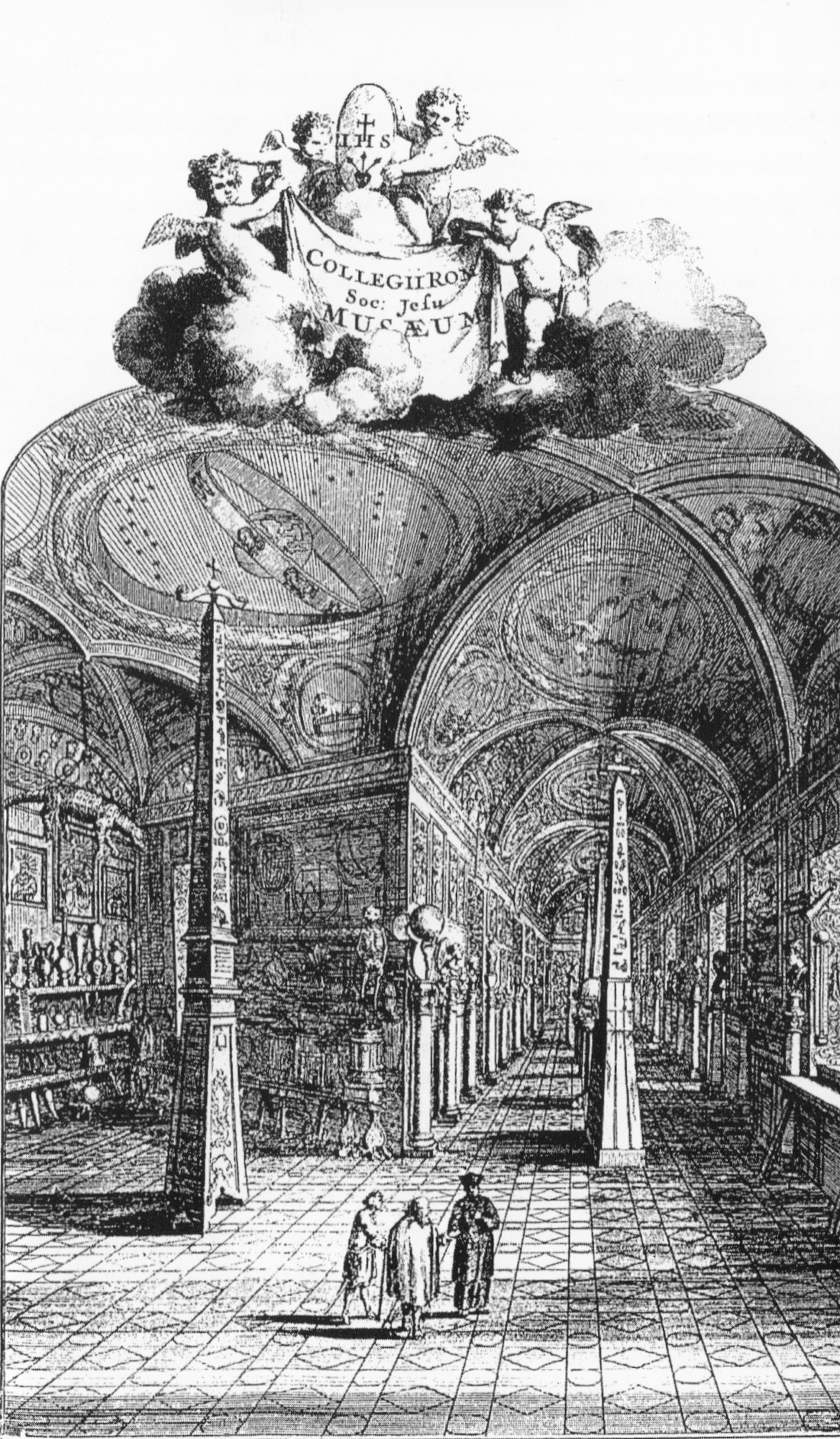
- The Kircherian Museum in 1679
- Established: 1651
- Dissolved: 1916
- Location: Piazza del Collegio Romano 4, Rome
- Coordinates: 41.8989°N 12.4845°E
- Type: Archaeology, science, and technology museum
- Founder: Athanasius Kircher

The Kircherian Museum was a public collection of antiquities and artifacts, a cabinet of curiosities, founded in 1651 by the Jesuit father Athanasius Kircher in the Roman College. Considered the first museum in the world, its collections were gradually dispersed over the centuries under different curatorships. After the Unification of Italy, the museum was dissolved in 1916 and its collection was granted to various other Roman and regional museums.

== History ==
In 1651, Italian aristocrat and antiquarian Alfonso Donnini donated his "cabinet of curiosities" to the members of the Roman College. The collection contained "various curious and precious things so that they can take care of it and their studies may benefit from it." Father Athanasius Kircher (1602–1680), professor of mathematics, physics, and oriental languages, took care of the collection and transformed it into a museum of antiquity, technology, art, science, and archeology.

Famous and admired by the most enlightened minds of his time and by his students at the Roman College for his scientific knowledge and philosophical eclecticism, Kircher added natural history objects collected during his expeditions to Sicily (1630) and Malta (1636), musical instruments, and even machines of his own invention. He used his contacts, particularly Jesuits abroad, to augment ethnographic collections with exotic objects from overseas missions.

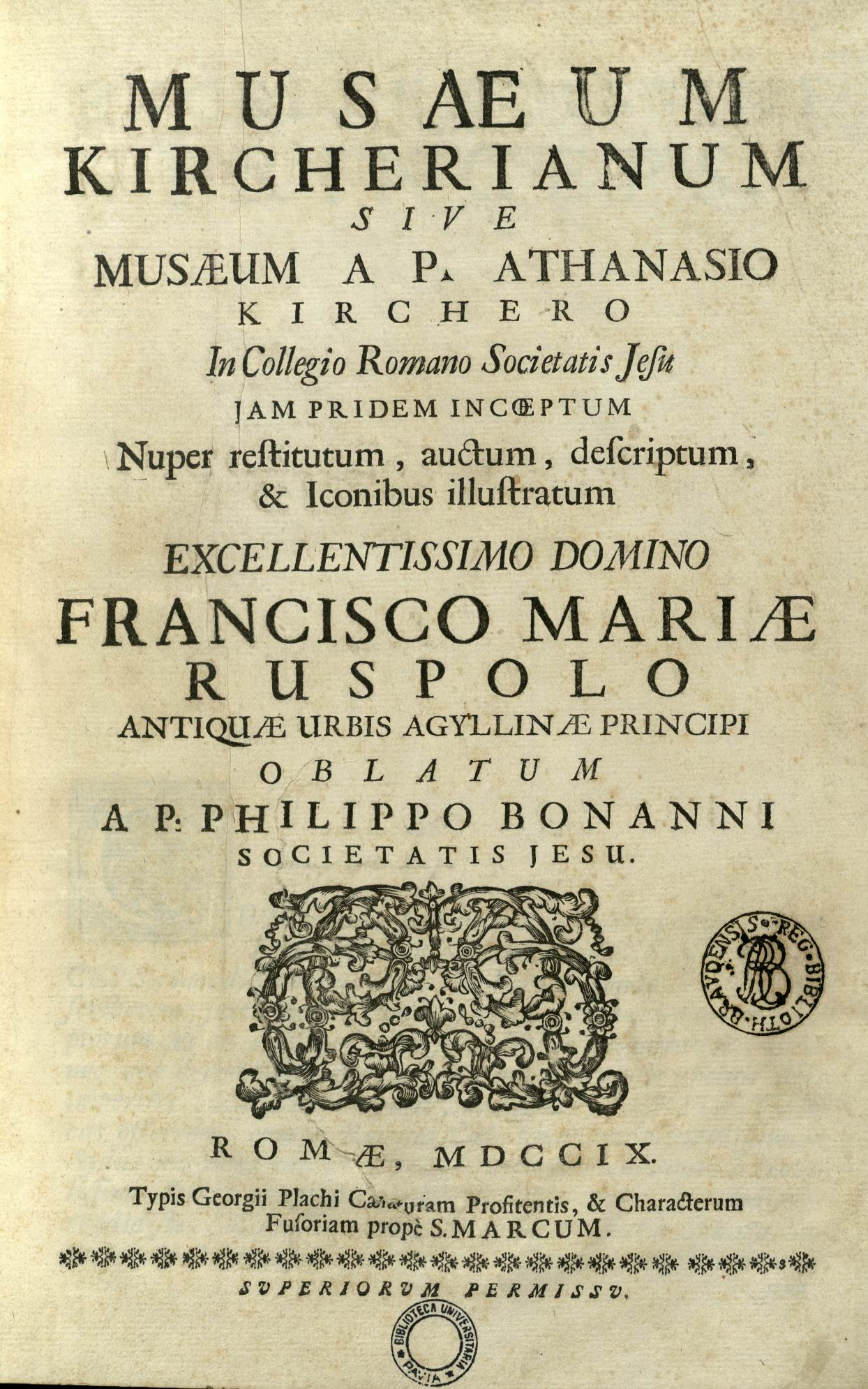
Filippo Bonanni, Musaeum Kircherianum, 1709

The museum quickly became popular and hosted many visitors. The first catalog was published in 1678 by Giorgio de Sepibus and included some illustrated tables, today the only evidence of the museum's layout. After Kircher's death in 1680, the museum went through a period of neglect. It took on new life and vigor thanks to the activity of the new curator Filippo Bonanni who published a second catalog in 1709. By comparing the two catalogs, it is clear that many objects had already disappeared from the collection. Over time the museum regained its former glory and thanks to the aid received and the many donations, it became the seat of many important collections on fields of knowledge from experimental philosophy to esotericism to technology. Fathers Orazio Borgondio (1725-1741), Contuccio Contucci (1741-1761) and Antonio Maria Ambrogi (1761-1772) succeeded Bonanni as curators; during this period the Marquis Alessandro Gregorio Capponi and King August of Poland added their donations to the museum. The archaeology collection was expanded by the Jesuit Contuccio Contucci, director of the museum between 1741 and 1761.

=== Dispersement ===
The last Jesuit director of the Museum was the scholar Antonio Maria Ambrogi (1713–1788). In 1773, following the Suppression of the Jesuits by Clement XIV, the Roman College was entrusted to the clergy of Rome and the collections began to undergo drastic alterations: many finds ended up in the Pio-Clementino Museum in the Vatican Museums. In 1814, the Society of Jesus was reconstituted by Pius VII, and in 1824, Leo XII returned the college and museum to the Jesuits. From 1839 and for almost twenty years, the museum was directed by Giuseppe Marchi. Marchi attempted a reorganization of the collection and produced a monograph on the ancient coins preserved there, the Aes grave del Museo Kircheriano.

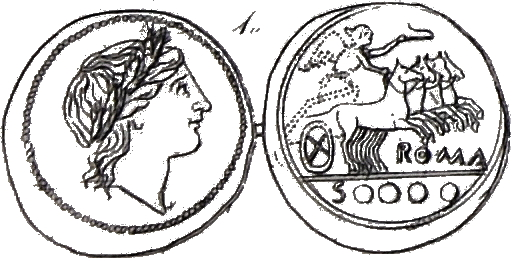
Print from Aes grave del Museo Kircheriano depicting Roman coins

When Rome was conquered in 1870 and became the capital of the Kingdom of Italy, most of the ecclesiastical properties were expropriated by the new, unified state. The Ennio Quirino Visconti Liceo Ginnasio and the Biblioteca Nazionale Centrale di Roma were placed in the Roman College. The Kircherian Museum also became a state museum and between 1881 and 1913 was directed by Luigi Pigorini, who increased its collections by joining the Pigorini National Museum of Prehistory and Ethnography to it.

In 1913, a decree of the Ministry of Education authorized the definitive dispersion of the collections, which were distributed in the new state museums of the capital. The Etruscan and Italic antiquities went to the National Etruscan Museum, the Roman ones to the National Roman Museum, the medieval and Renaissance to the Castel Sant'Angelo and, in 1916, the new Museo nazionale del Palazzo di Venezia. Some curiosities, such as the wooden models of the Roman obelisks, remained at the college; the Pigorini National Museum of Prehistory and Ethnography was finally transferred to Roman neighborhood of Europa in the 1960s.

== Legacy ==
An exhibition dedicated the Kircherian museum was held in Rome at the Palazzo Venezia in 2001. The Italian Ministero della Cultura published a catalog with photos of objects in the Kircher collection that had been dispersed to other institutions. In recent years, the teachers and pupils of the Liceo Visconti have prepared a museum layout that recalls the historic Kircherian museum.

== See also ==
- List of Jesuit sites
- Antiquarianism

== Bibliography ==
- Encyclopedism in Baroque Rome: Athanasius Kircher and the Museo del Collegio Romano between Wunderkammer and the scientific museum, curated by Maristella Casciato. Venice, Marsilio 1986. ISBN 88-317-4846-7
- Findlen, Paula (1995). "Scientific spectacle in Baroque Rome: Athanasius Kircher and the Roman College Museum". Roma Moderna e Contemporanea. III (3): 625–665.
- Athanasius Kircher - the museum of the world [Rome, Palazzo di Venezia, February 28 - April 22, 2001], Ministry for Cultural Heritage and Activities, Central Office for Archival Heritage. Curated by Eugenio Lo Sardo. Rome, De Luca 2001. ISBN 88-8016-421-X, ISBN 88-8016-409-0
- Claudia Cerchiai (edited by), The Roman College from its origins to the Ministry for Cultural Heritage and Activities, Rome, 2003.
- Alberto Bartòla, «At the origins of the Roman College museum. Documents and testimonies ", in Nuncius, 1, 2004, pp. 297–356.
- Angela Mayer-Deutsch, Das Museum Kircherianum. Kontemplative Momente, historische Rekonstruktion, Bildrhetorik, Zürich, 2010.
- Nathalie Lallemand-Buyssens, «The acquisitions of Athanasius Kircher in the museum of the Romain Collège à la lumière de documents inédits», in History of Art, n. 133, Oct-Dec 2012, pp. 107–129.
- Filippo Bonanni (1709). Musaeum Kircherianum (in Latin). Roma: Giorgio Placho.
