= Matteo Campani-Alimenis =

Italian mechanician and natural philosopher

Matteo or Mathieu Campani-Alimenis (born in Spoleto, Italy) was a mechanician and natural philosopher of the 17th century.

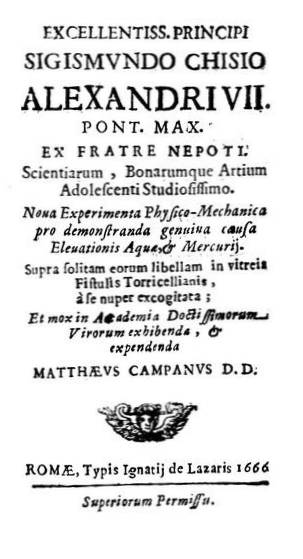
Noua experimenta physico-mechanica (1666)

== Life ==
He held a curacy at Rome in 1661, but devoted himself principally to scientific pursuits. As an optician he is chiefly celebrated for, the manufacture of the large object-glasses with which Cassini discovered two of Saturn's satellites, and for an attempt to rectify chromatic aberration by using a triple eyeglass; and in clock-making, for his invention of the illuminated dial-plate, and that of noiseless clocks, as well as for an attempt to correct the irregularities of the pendulum which arise from variations of temperature. Campani published in 1678 a work on horology, and on the manufacture of lenses for telescopes.

His younger brother Giuseppe was also an ingenious optician (indeed the attempt to correct chromatic aberration has been ascribed to him instead of to Matteo), and is, besides, noteworthy as an astronomer, especially for his discovery, by the aid of a telescope of his own construction, of the spots in Jupiter, the credit of which was, however, also claimed by Eustachio Divini.

== Works ==
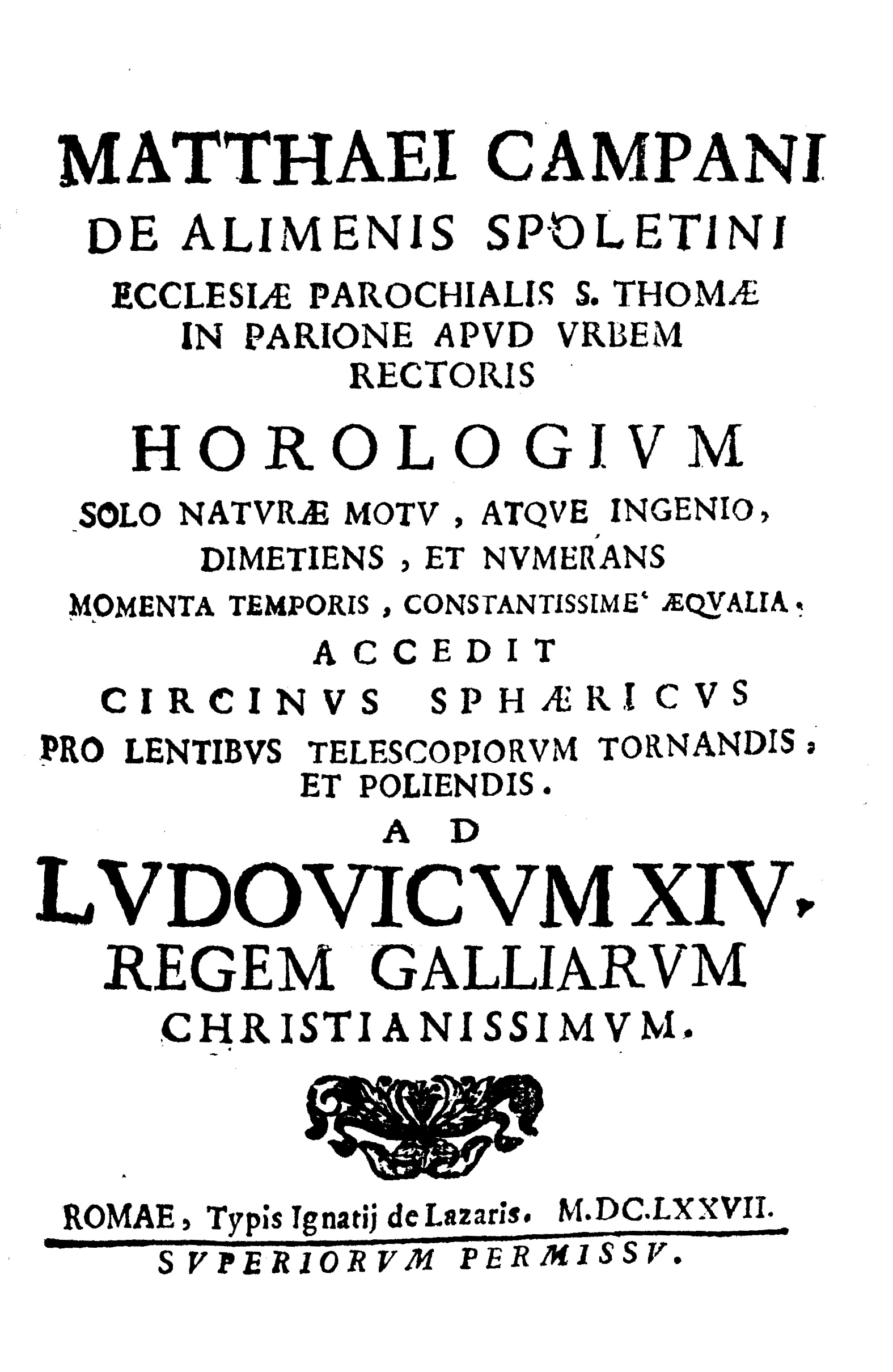
Horologium solo naturae motu, atque ingenio, dimetiens, et numerans momenta temporis, constantissime aequali, 1677

- Nova experimenta physico-mechanica pro demonstranda genuina causa elevationis aquae et mercurii (in Latin). Roma: Ignazio Lazzari. 1666.
- Horologium solo naturae motu, atque ingenio, dimetiens, et numerans momenta temporis, constantissime aequalia (in Latin). Roma: Ignazio Lazzari. 1677.

== See also ==
- List of astronomical instrument makers
