= Giuseppe Campani =

Italian optician and astronomer

- Campani's compound microscop, Museo Galileo, Florence
- Born: 1635; Castel San Felice, Spoleto, Papal States
- Died: 28 July 1715 (aged 79–80); Rome, Papal States
- Occupation: Instrument maker
- Known for: Early telescopes

Giuseppe Campani (1635–July 28, 1715) was an Italian optician and astronomer who lived in Rome during the latter half of the 17th century.

== Life ==
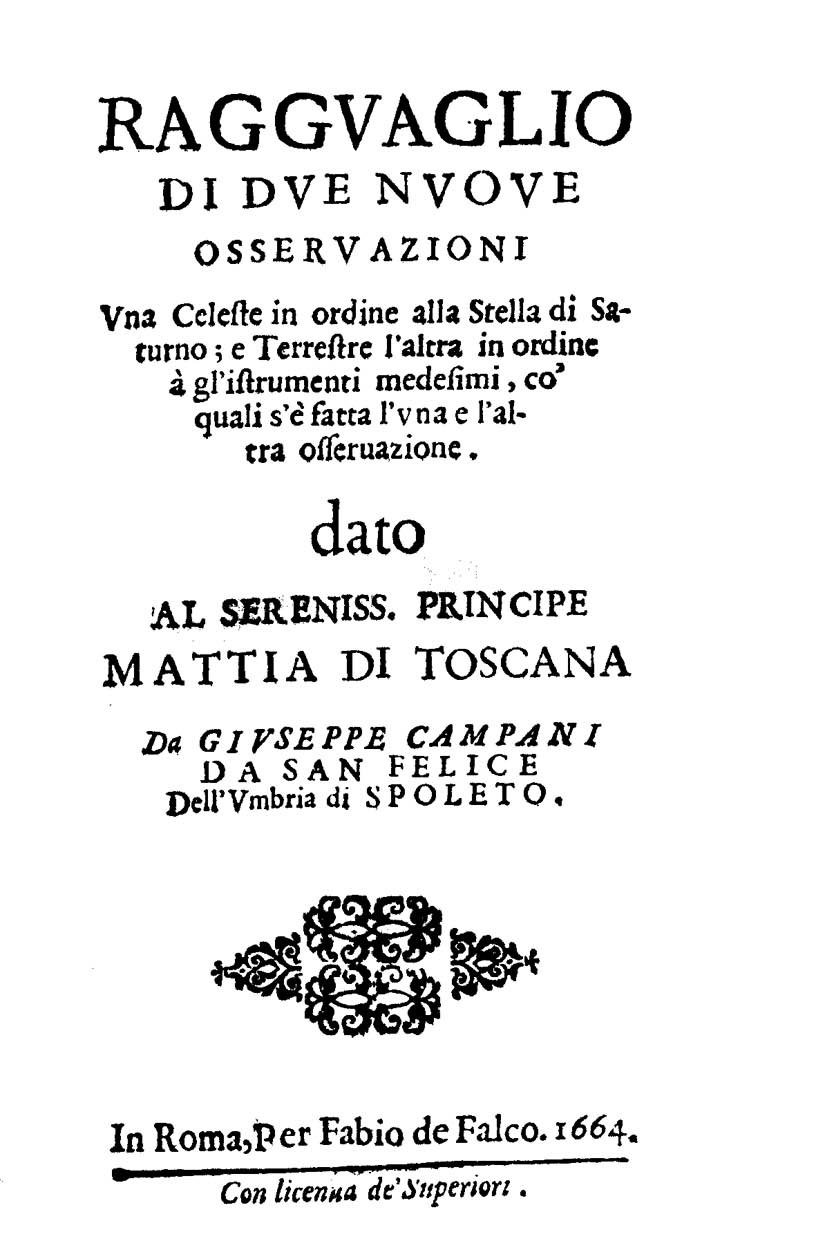
Ragguaglio di due nuove osservazioni una celeste in ordine alla stella di Saturno; e terrestre l'altra in ordine a gl'istrumenti medesimi, co' quali s'e fatta l'una e l'altra osservazione, 1664

Giuseppe Campani was born in 1635. He was an Umbrian from Castel San Felice near Spoleto. His lenses and telescopes, made in Rome, were sent as far as Florence and Paris. Campani was known as the best maker of optical instruments of his age. His brother, Matteo Campani-Alimenis, and he were experts in grinding and polishing lenses, especially for very long focal length aerial telescope objectives. His brother is also noted as a mechanician for his work on clocks. He was a priest in charge of a parish in Rome.

Louis XIV of France ordered several long-focus lenses (86, 100, 136 feet respectively) for the astronomer Giovanni Domenico Cassini. With these Cassini found several moons of the planet Saturn, among other discoveries. Constantijn Huygens, Jr., brother of Christiaan Huygens, acquired one of Campani's telescopes. While in London in 1689 he ordered a new tube for the instrument from the instrument maker John Marshall.

== Astronomer ==
Campani made many observations himself. Cassini called his attention to the spots on Jupiter, and he disputed with Eustachio Divini, an Italian optician, the priority of their discovery. His astronomical observations and his descriptions of his telescopes are detailed in the following papers: Ragguaglio di due nuovi osservazioni, una celeste in ordine alla stella di Saturno, e terrestre l'altra in ordine agl' instrumenti (Rome, 1664, and again in 1665); Lettere di G. C. al sig. Giovanni Domenico Cassini intorno alle ombre delle stelle Medicee nel volto di Giove, ed altri nuovi fenomeni celesti scoperti co' suoi occhiali (Rome, 1666).

== Instruments ==
Campani's entire workshop was donated to the Gabinetto di Fisica of the Academy of Sciences of Bologna Institute in 1747. His telescopes were 20 to 50 feet (6.1 to 15.2 m) in length. A 10 feet (3.0 m) telescope by Campani was tested in 1871 and was found to provide good definition and a flat field, with a magnification of about 20 times. A tripod compound monocular microscope made by Campani is held in the Billings microscope collection at Walter Reed Army Medical Center in Washington, D.C.

== Works ==
- Ragguaglio di due nuove osservazioni una celeste in ordine alla stella di Saturno; e terrestre l'altra in ordine a gl'istrumenti medesimi, co' quali s'e fatta l'una e l'altra osservazione (in Italian). Roma: Fabio Di Falco. 1664.
