= Sarah Windsor Tomlinson =

Sarah Windsor Tomlinson (28 December 1809 – 17 October 1872) was a British writer from Salisbury, Wiltshire. She was the wife of British scientist Charles Tomlinson, a member of the Royal Society.

== Biography ==
Windsor was born on Innocent’s Day at Salisbury, Wiltshire in 1809. She was educated by her elder sister, Maria, who shaped her character and upbringing. She also trained in Sunday-School teaching and parochial work at St Thomas's Church, Salisbury, under the guidance of the vicar, Rev. Capel, and his wife. At the age of 22, Sarah worked as an educator for the two eldest daughters of a lady in North Wiltshire; she served under the lady for five years, to whom she owed her development in becoming a good wife and housekeeper.

In 1835, Windsor's elder sister Maria married Rev. L. Tomlinson, who managed a large school in Salisbury with his brother Charles Tomlinson. Sarah married Charles in 1839, and the couple moved to London, where they lived in a small house at 12 Bedford Place, Euston. Charles was involved in a wide range of literary and scientific engagements in London. For many years, the couple worked together on the Saturday Magazine, publishing weekly articles about nature, science, history and technology. Sarah also wrote several books for the Committee of General Literature and Education, under the Society for Promoting Christian Knowledge. Among her prominent works were a series titled First Steps in General Knowledge, Sketches of Rural Affairs and Lessons Derived from the Animal World. In 1842, the couple moved to a bigger house at 178 Hampstead Road after Charles was appointed at King’s College. The couple often received boarding students from the Department of Applied Sciences, which placed great responsibility on Sarah to manage the household and discipline of the students. The couple also hosted Saturday evening parties, which were attended by scientists, artists, and writers.

In 1866, the Tomlinsons moved to a new home at 7 North Road, Highgate. Sarah became a superintendent to a parochial mission in London, where her duties included reading books to mothers assembled at the weekly meetings. While she served there, she wrote Tales For Mission Rooms, By a Lady Superintendent, a collection of short stories about morality and values. Sarah was struck with a debilitating disease as she was writing these tales, and she persevered to complete them through her 14 months of illness.

She died on 17 October 1872 and was buried on 23 October on the eastern side of Highgate Cemetery. Her husband Charles was later buried in the same grave (plot no.19020). The grave is now under a footpath and does not have a headstone.

== Publications ==
Tomlinson authored a wide range of books throughout the course of her life, among which were:

- First Steps in General Knowledge (SPCK, 1846)
- Lessons Derived from the Animal World (SPCK, 1847)
- Sketches of Rural Affairs (with numerous illustrations; SPCK, 1851)
- Tales for Mission Rooms, By a Lady Superintendent (SPCK, 1873)
