= George Merryweather =

British inventor

George Merryweather was a British medical doctor and inventor, known for inventing the Tempest Prognosticator.

== Inventions ==
In 1832 George wrote his first essay "The means of maintaining uniform temperature and supporting fire without the agency of wood or coal". He invented the "Platina Lamp", which was described to "keep burning for a fortnight on an economical mixture of pure alcohol and whisky, at a cost of one penny for eight hours".

His best-known invention was the Tempest Prognosticator—a weather predicting device also called "The Leech Barometer". It consists of twelve glass bottles containing leeches, which, when disturbed by the atmospheric conditions preceding a storm, climb upwards, triggering a small whalebone hammer which rings a bell. Merryweather referred to the leeches as his "jury of philosophical councilors", suggesting that the more of the leeches that climbed, and the more the bell was rung, the greater the likelihood of a storm. He explained that the twelve bottles were placed in a circle in order that his "little comrades" might see one another and "not endure the affliction of solitary confinement".

The invention had great success and caused a sensation when it was put on show at the Great Exhibition, so in 1850–1 Merryweather wrote "An essay explanatory of the tempest prognosticator in the Great Exhibition 1851". At this time he was an honorary curator of Whitby Literary and Philosophical Society. The device is on permanent exhibition there (as at 2026).

After the success of the Tempest Prognosticator at the Great Exhibition, Merryweather tried to persuade the British government to install his device at ports around the British coast. However, the government and the Meteorological Department decided to use barometers and weather charts instead.

Modern science considers Merryweather's methods underlying the "Tempest Prognosticator" to be unproven.

== Career as a doctor of medicine ==
In 1835 Merryweather finished studying in MD University of Edinburgh. In 1840 he worked as a family doctor in Whitby, and by 1849 he was a surgeon.
