= Emma Anne Georgiana Davenport =

British novelist

Emma Anne Georgiana Davenport (c. 1819-1910) was a British children's novelist. She is best known for her works published in the catalogue of New and Popular Works Principally for Young Persons by Griffith and Farran, which includes Fickle Flora and Her Seaside Friends (1863) and Our Birthdays and How to Improve Them (1881). For a period of her career she published educational books under the direction of The Committee of General Literature and Education, appointed by the Society for Promoting Christian Knowledge. How we Dine, or Dinners Ready (1866) is the most notable of her educational contributions.

== Early life ==
Emma Anne Georgiana Webber Davenport was born circa 1819. Her parents were Caroline Frances Fynes-Clinton and the Very Reverend James Webber, Dean of Ripon (1772-1847). They married on 13 September 1813. The Very Rev. James Webber was painted as an example of church abuses in his time and thus was buried without monument when he died in 1847. Emma was one of seven children.

== Marriage ==
Emma Anne Georgiana Davenport married Charles Edgecombe Davenport on 28 January 1847. Charles was the youngest son of Rear-Admiral Sir Salusbury Pryce Humphreys (1778-1845) and Maria Davenport (m. 31 May 1810). Charles was a member of the Royal Regiment and thus the couple and their children moved multiple times through Scotland and England over their life together. His highest position was as Lieutenant in the Depot Battalion 1st, or The Royal Regiment of Foot during 1851. During this time the family lived in Aberdeen, Scotland. The couple had six children.

Emma Davenport outlived her husband by 35 years. He died in December 1875 at the age of 56. Emma Davenport died at 91 years old on 7 December 1910 in the Hastings district of Sussex, England.

== Career ==
Emma Davenport published fourteen novels over a 26 year span. Most of these can be classified as chapter books for children, however the book The Dawn and the Object (1867) was critiqued as an adult novel. Many of her books were written with the intent of teaching young children and encouraging their curiosities. In the preface of her novel Jamie's Questions (1858), she says "Enough only is said to excite curiosity, and to tempt an intelligent child to seek further, after having gained a slight knowledge of many things that provoke natural inquiry." Through her novels, Davenport encouraged children to seek what is to be learned from everyday life. Many of her novels included illustrations by various artists.

== Publications ==
Major Works, sorted in order of publication date:

- Philip: A story of Real Life, Written by a Mother for her Own Children (1855)
- Weak and Willful, a Tale for Children (1857)
- Jamie's Questions (1858)
- Live Toys, or Anecdotes of our Four-Legged and other Pets (1861)
- Fickle Flora and her Seaside Friends (1863)
  - Illustrated by John Absolon
- The Happy Holidays, or Brothers and Sisters at Home (1865)
- How we Dine, or Dinners Ready (1866)
- The Dawn and the Object (1867)
- Phillis, or the Jealous One (1867)
- Grandmamma, a Tale for Children (1868)
- Constance and Nellie, or the Lost Will (1869)
- Vain Ambition, or Only a Girl (1878)
- The Holidays Abroad, or Right at Last (1881)
- Our Birthdays, and how to Improve Them (1881)
