= Barograph =

Barometer that graphs pressure over time

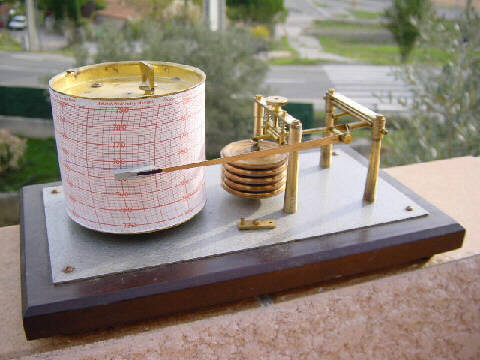
A traditional barograph, without its protective case

A barograph is a barometer that records the barometric pressure over time in graphical form. This instrument is also used to make a continuous recording of atmospheric pressure. The pressure-sensitive element, a partially evacuated metal cylinder, is linked to a pen arm in such a way that the vertical displacement of the pen is proportional to the changes in the atmospheric pressure.

== Development ==
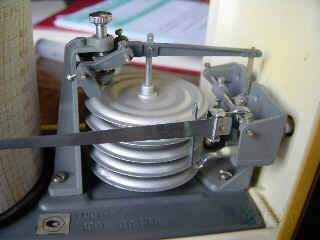
A barograph fitted with five aneroid capsules stacked in series, to amplify the amount of movement

Alexander Cumming, a watchmaker and mechanic, has a claim to having made the first effective recording barograph in the 1760s using an aneroid cell. Cumming created a series of barometrical clocks, including one for King George III. However, this type of design fell out of favour. Since the amount of movement that can be generated by a single aneroid is minuscule, up to seven aneroids (so called Vidie-cans) are often stacked "in series" to amplify their motion. This type of barograph was invented in 1844 by the Frenchman Lucien Vidi (1805–1866).

In such barographs one or more aneroid cells act through a gear or lever train to drive a recording arm that has at its extreme end either a scribe or a pen. A scribe records on smoked foil while a pen records on paper using ink, held in a nib. The recording material is mounted on a cylindrical drum which is rotated slowly by clockwork. Commonly, the drum makes one revolution per day, per week, or per month and the rotation rate can often be selected by the user.

Various other types of barograph have also been invented. Karl Kreil described a machine in 1843 based on a syphon barometer, where a pencil marked a chart at uniform intervals. Francis Ronalds, the Honorary Director of the Kew Observatory, created the first successful barograph utilising photography in 1845. The changing height of the mercury in the barometer was recorded on a continuously moving photosensitive surface. By 1847, a sophisticated temperature-compensation mechanism was also employed. Ronalds’ barograph was utilised by the UK Meteorological Office for many years to assist in weather forecasting and the machines were supplied to numerous observatories around the world.

== Modern use ==
Today, traditional recording barographs for meteorological use have commonly been superseded (though not all) by electronic weather instruments that use computer methods to record the barometric pressure. These are not only less expensive than earlier barographs but they may also offer both greater recording length and the ability to perform further data analysis on the captured data, including automated use of the data to forecast the weather. Older mechanical barographs are highly prized by collectors as they make good display items, often being made of high-quality woods and brass.

The most common weather Barograph found in homes and public buildings these days are the 8-day type. Some important manufacturers of barographs are Negretti and Zambra, Short and Mason, and Richard Ferris among others. The late Victorian to early 20th century is generally considered to be the heyday of Barograph manufacture. Many important refinements were made at this time, including improved temperature compensation and modification of the pen arm, to allow less weight to be applied to the paper, allowing better registration of small pressure changes (i.e. less friction on the nib). Marine barographs (used on ships) often include damping. This evens out the motion of the ship so that a more stable reading can be obtained, this can be either oil damping of the mechanism or simple coiled spring feet on the base. But, newer solid state, digital barographs eliminate this issue altogether, since they use no moving parts.

== Use in aviation ==
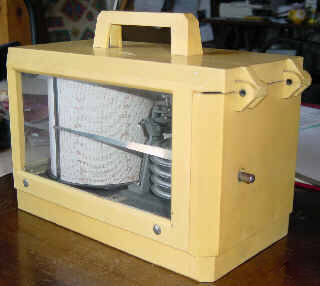
A sailplane barograph in its case

As atmospheric pressure responds in a predictable manner to changes in altitude, barographs may be used to record elevation changes during an aircraft flight. Barographs were required by the FAI to record certain tasks and record attempts associated with sailplanes. A continuously varying trace indicated that the sailplane had not landed during a task, while measurements from a calibrated trace could be used to establish the completion of altitude tasks or the setting of records. Examples of FAI approved sailplane barographs included the Replogle mechanical drum barograph and the EW electronic barograph (which may be used in conjunction with GPS). Mechanical barographs are not commonly used for flight documentation now, having been displaced by GNSS flight recorders.

== Three-day barograph ==
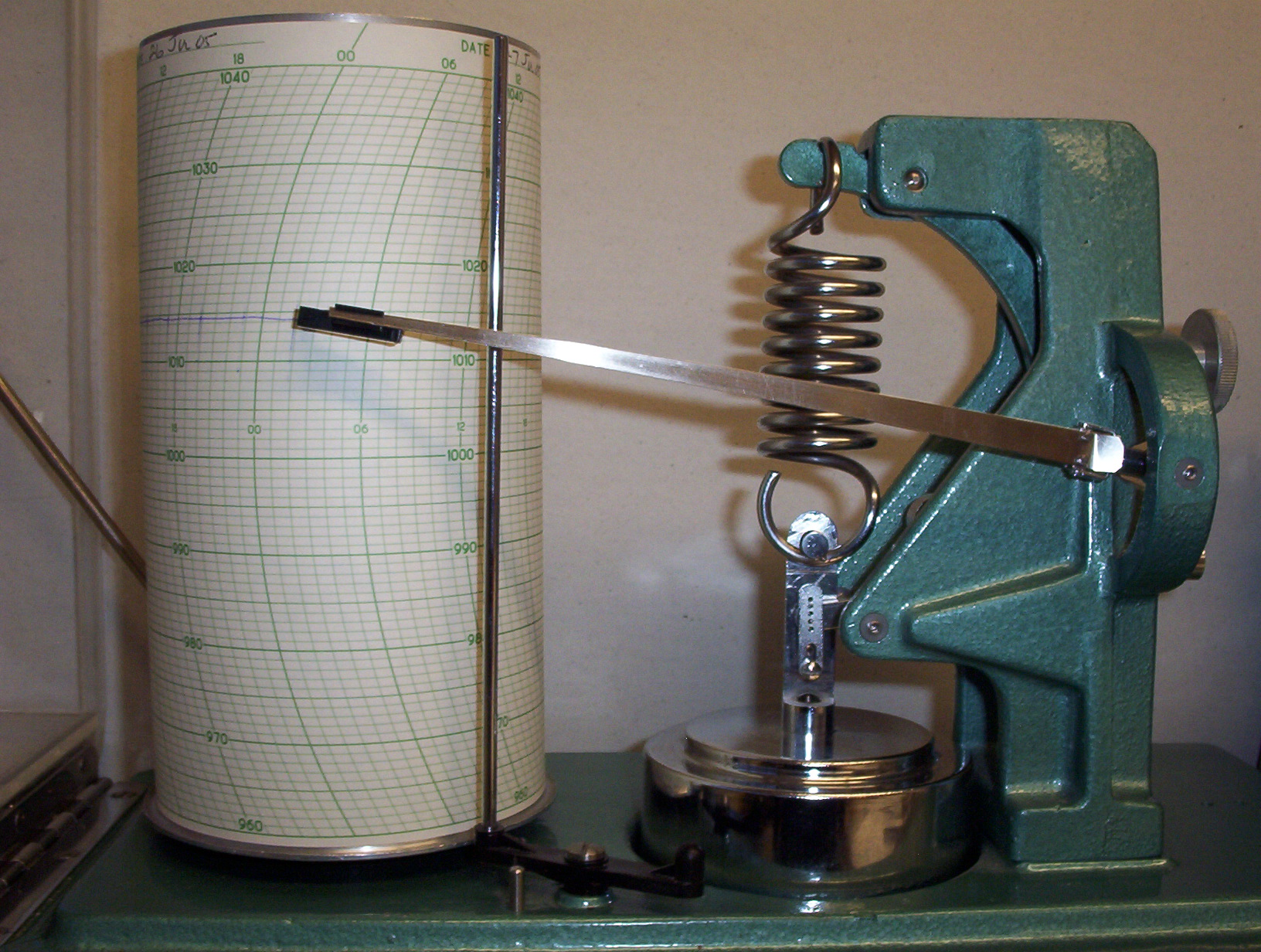
Three-day barograph of the type used by the Meteorological Service of Canada

On the top right of the picture of the three-day barograph can be seen a silver knurled knob. This is to adjust the barograph so that it correctly reflects the station pressure. Barely visible below the knob is a small silver plunger. This is pressed every three hours to leave a time mark on the paper.

The line between two of these marks is called the 'characteristic of barometric tendency' and is used by weather forecasters. The observer would first note if the pressure was lower or higher than three hours prior. Next, a code number would be chosen that best represents the three-hour trace. There are nine possible choices (0 to 8) and no single code has preference over another. In the case of the graph on the barograph, one of two codes could be picked. An 8 (steady then decreasing) or 6 (decreasing then steady). The observer should pick the 6 because it represents the last part of the trace and is thus most representative of the pressure change.

In the bottom centre is the aneroid (large circular silver object). As the pressure increases, the aneroid is pushed down causing the arm to move up and leave a trace on the paper. As the pressure decreases, the spring lifts the aneroid and the arm moves down.

After three days the drum to which the graph is attached is removed. At this point the clockwork motor is wound and if necessary corrections can be made to increase or decrease the speed and new chart is attached.

== See also ==
- Thermo-hygrograph
