= Barometer =

Scientific instrument used to measure atmospheric pressure

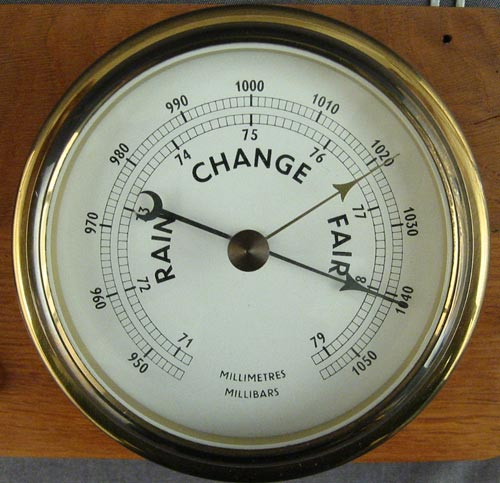
An analog barometer

A barometer is a scientific instrument that is used to measure air pressure. Pressure tendency, which is derived from barometric readings, can forecast short term changes in the weather. Many measurements of air pressure are used within surface weather analysis to help find surface troughs, pressure systems and frontal boundaries.

Barometers and pressure altimeters (the most basic and common type of altimeter) are essentially the same instrument, but used for different purposes. A pressure altimeter is used to estimate altitude by measuring the pressure of the atmosphere surrounding the altimeter and comparing the result to the expected atmospheric pressure at various altitudes, while a barometer is kept at a constant altitude and measures subtle pressure changes caused by weather and elements of weather. The average atmospheric pressure on the Earth's surface varies between 940 and 1040 hPa (mbar). The average atmospheric pressure at sea level is 1013 hPa (mbar).

== Etymology ==
The word barometer is derived from the Ancient Greek βάρος (báros), meaning "weight", and μέτρον (métron), meaning "measure".

== History ==
Evangelista Torricelli is usually credited with inventing the barometer in 1643, although the historian W. E. Knowles Middleton suggests the more likely date is 1644 (when Torricelli first reported his experiments; the 1643 date was only suggested after his death).Gasparo Berti, an Italian mathematician and astronomer, also built a rudimentary water barometer sometime between 1640 and 1644, but it was not a true barometer as it was not intended to move and record variable air pressure. French scientist and philosopher René Descartes described the design of an experiment to determine atmospheric pressure as early as 1631, but there is no evidence that he built a working barometer at that time. In 1668, Robert Hooke's marine barometer, made by Henry Hunt, was noticed, and efforts were made to make it sea-worthy.

=== Baliani's siphon experiment ===
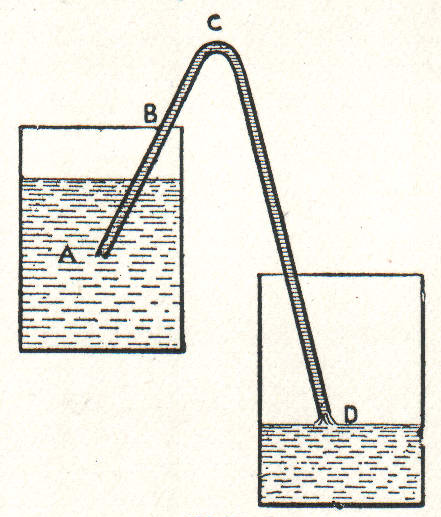
Siphon

On 27 July 1630, Giovanni Battista Baliani wrote a letter to Galileo Galilei explaining an experiment he had made in which a siphon, led over a hill about 21 m high, failed to work. When the end of the siphon was opened in a reservoir, the water level in that limb would sink to about 10 m above the reservoir. Galileo responded with an explanation of the phenomenon: he proposed that it was the power of a vacuum that held the water up, and at a certain height the amount of water simply became too much and the force could not hold any more, like a cord that can support only so much weight. This was a restatement of the theory of horror vacui ("nature abhors a vacuum"), which dates to Aristotle, and which Galileo restated as resistenza del vacuo.

=== Berti's vacuum experiment ===
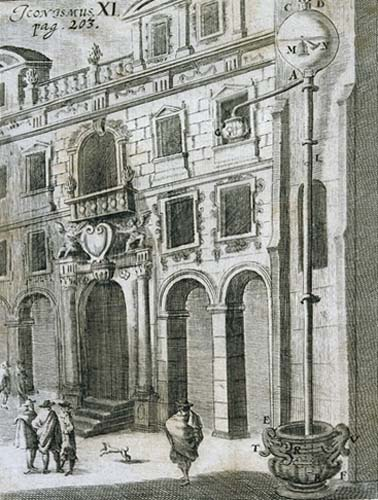
Gasparo Berti's experiment

Galileo's ideas, presented in his Discorsi (Two New Sciences), reached Rome in December 1638. Physicists Gasparo Berti and father Raffaello Magiotti were excited by these ideas, and decided to seek a better way to attempt to produce a vacuum other than with a siphon. Magiotti devised such an experiment. Four accounts of the experiment exist, all written some years later. No exact date was given, but since Two New Sciences reached Rome in December 1638, and Berti died before January 2, 1644, science historian W. E. Knowles Middleton places the event to sometime between 1639 and 1643. Present were Berti, Magiotti, Jesuit polymath Athanasius Kircher, and Jesuit physicist Niccolò Zucchi.

In brief, Berti's experiment consisted of filling with water a long tube that had both ends plugged, then standing the tube in a basin of water. The bottom end of the tube was opened, and water that had been inside of it poured out into the basin. However, only part of the water in the tube flowed out, and the level of the water inside the tube stayed at an exact level, which happened to be 10.3 m (34 ft), the same height limit Baliani had observed in the siphon. What was most important about this experiment was that the lowering water had left a space above it in the tube which had no intermediate contact with air to fill it up. This seemed to suggest the possibility of a vacuum existing in the space above the water.

=== Evangelista Torricelli ===
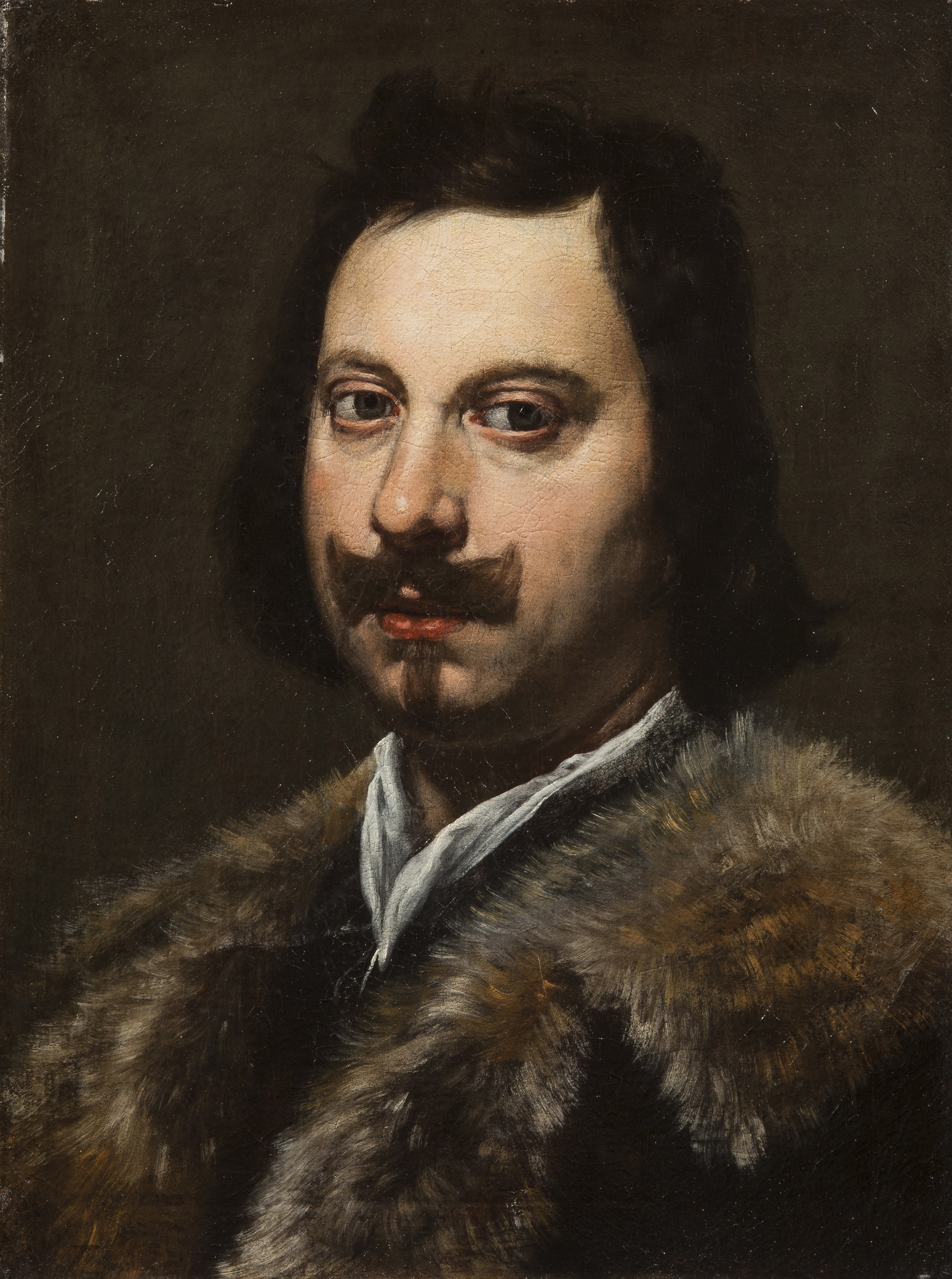
Evangelista Torricelli

Evangelista Torricelli, who was Galileo's amanuensis for the last three months of his life, interpreted the results of the experiments in a novel way. He proposed that the weight of the atmosphere, not an attracting force of the vacuum, held the water in the tube. In a letter to Michelangelo Ricci in 1644 concerning the experiments, he wrote:

Many have said that a vacuum does not exist, others that it does exist in spite of the repugnance of nature and with difficulty; I know of no one who has said that it exists without difficulty and without a resistance from nature. I argued thus: If there can be found a manifest cause from which the resistance can be derived which is felt if we try to make a vacuum, it seems to me foolish to try to attribute to vacuum those operations which follow evidently from some other cause; and so by making some very easy calculations, I found that the cause assigned by me (that is, the weight of the atmosphere) ought by itself alone to offer a greater resistance than it does when we try to produce a vacuum.

It was traditionally thought, especially by the Aristotelians, that the air did not have weight; that is, that the kilometers of air above the surface of the Earth did not exert any weight on the bodies below it. Even Galileo had accepted the weightlessness of air as a simple truth. Torricelli proposed that rather than an attractive force of the vacuum sucking up water, air did indeed have weight, which pushed on the water, holding up a column of it. He argued that the level that the water stayed at—c. 10.3 m above the water surface below—was reflective of the force of the air's weight pushing on the water in the basin, setting a limit for how far down the water level could sink in a tall, closed, water-filled tube. He viewed the barometer as a balance—an instrument for measurement—as opposed to merely an instrument for creating a vacuum, and since he was the first to view it this way, he is traditionally considered the inventor of the barometer, in the sense in which we now use the term.

==== Torricelli's mercury barometer ====
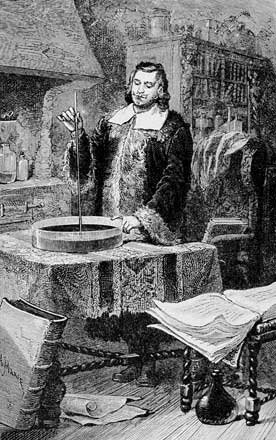
Torricelli's mercury in glass tube experiment

Because of rumors circulating in Torricelli's gossipy Italian neighborhood, which included that he was engaged in some form of sorcery or witchcraft, Torricelli realized he had to keep his experiment secret to avoid the risk of being arrested. He needed to use a liquid that was heavier than water, and from his previous association and suggestions by Galileo, he deduced that by using mercury, a shorter tube could be used. With mercury, which is about 14 times denser than water, a tube only 80 cm was now needed, not 10.5 m. Furthermore, Torricelli demonstrated that atmospheric pressure could support a column of mercury approximately 30 inches high.

=== Blaise Pascal ===
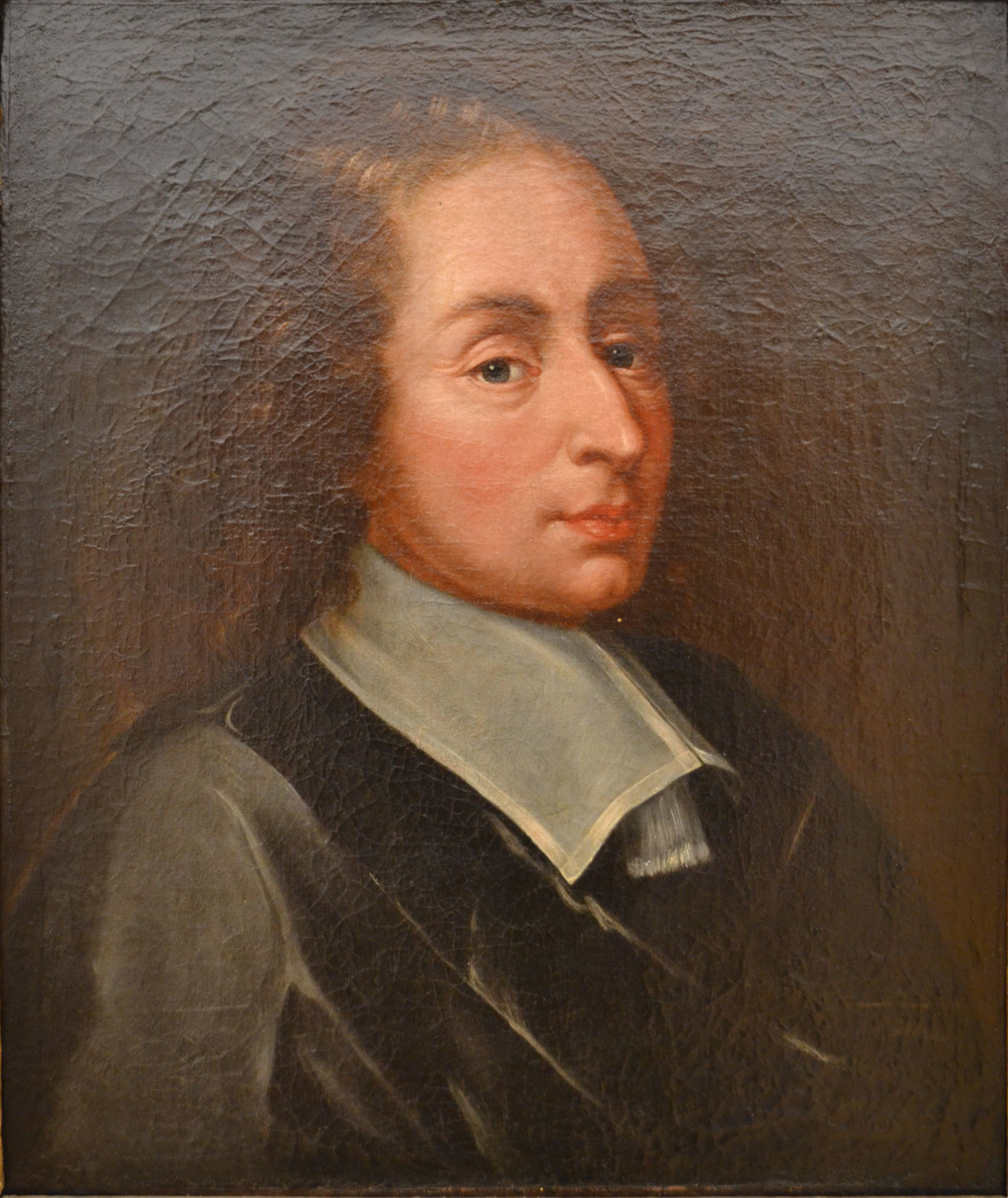
Blaise Pascal

In 1646, Blaise Pascal along with Pierre Petit, had repeated and perfected Torricelli's experiment after hearing about it from Marin Mersenne, who himself had been shown the experiment by Torricelli toward the end of 1644. Pascal further devised an experiment to test the Aristotelian proposition that it was vapours from the liquid that filled the space in a barometer. His experiment compared water with wine, and since the latter was considered more "spiritous", the Aristotelians expected the wine to stand lower (since more vapours would mean more pushing down on the liquid column). Pascal performed the experiment publicly, inviting the Aristotelians to predict the outcome beforehand. The Aristotelians predicted the wine would stand lower. It did not.

==== First atmospheric pressure vs. altitude experiment ====
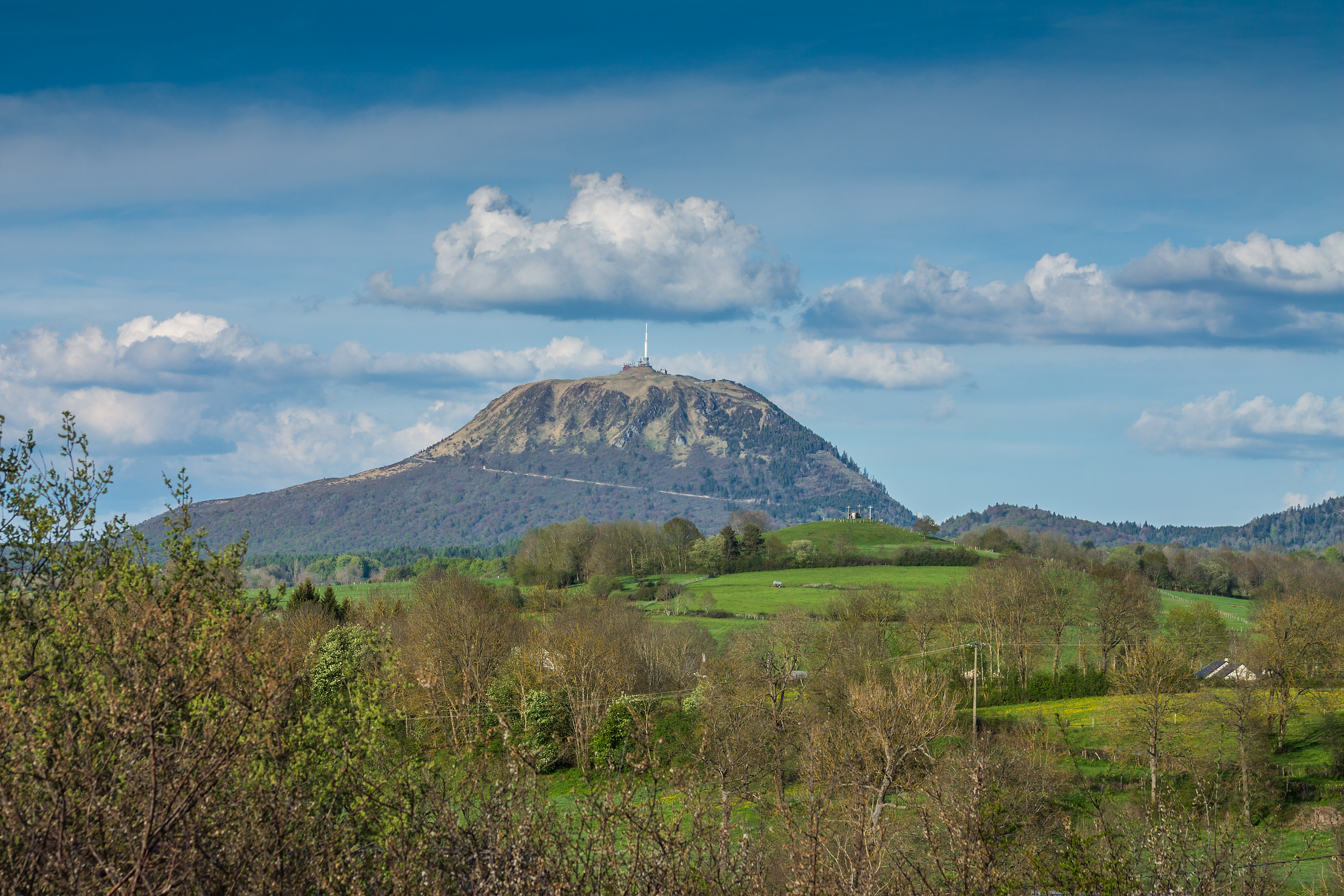
Puy de Dôme

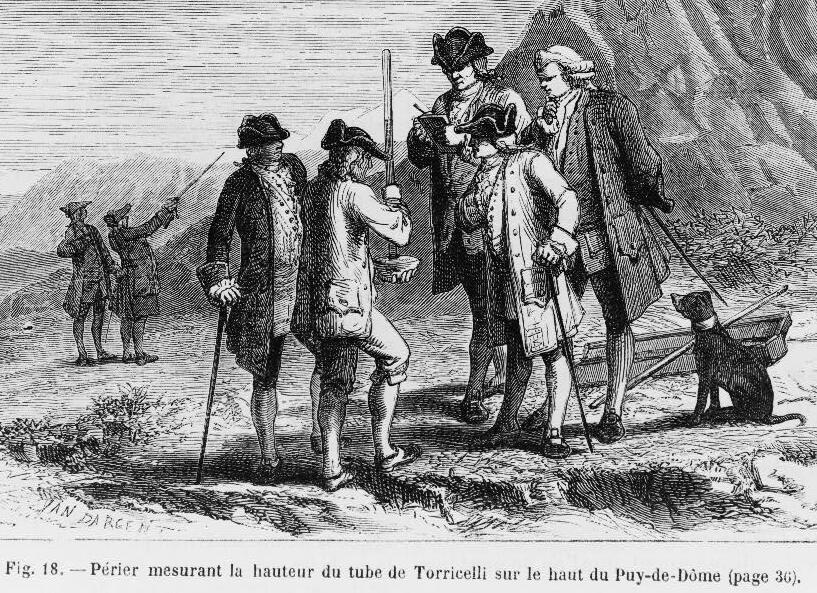
Florin Périer on the Puy de Dôme

However, Pascal went even further to test the mechanical theory. If, as suspected by mechanical philosophers like Torricelli and Pascal, air had weight, the pressure would be less at higher altitudes. Therefore, Pascal wrote to his brother-in-law, Florin Perier, who lived near a mountain called the Puy de Dôme, asking him to perform a crucial experiment. Perier was to take a barometer up the Puy de Dôme and make measurements along the way of the height of the column of mercury. He was then to compare it to measurements taken at the foot of the mountain to see if those measurements taken higher up were in fact smaller. In September 1648, Perier carefully and meticulously carried out the experiment, and found that Pascal's predictions had been correct. The column of mercury stood lower as the barometer was carried to a higher altitude.

== Types ==
=== Water barometers ===
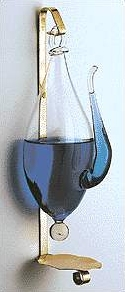
Goethe's device

The concept that decreasing atmospheric pressure predicts stormy weather, postulated by Lucien Vidi, provides the theoretical basis for a weather prediction device called a "weather glass" or a "Goethe barometer" (named for Johann Wolfgang von Goethe, the renowned German writer and polymath who developed a simple but effective weather ball barometer using the principles developed by Torricelli). The French name, le baromètre Liègeois, is used by some English speakers. This name reflects the origins of many early weather glasses – the glass blowers of Liège, Belgium.

The weather ball barometer consists of a glass container with a sealed body, half filled with water. A narrow spout connects to the body below the water level and rises above the water level. The narrow spout is open to the atmosphere. When the air pressure is lower than it was at the time the body was sealed, the water level in the spout will rise above the water level in the body; when the air pressure is higher, the water level in the spout will drop below the water level in the body. A variation of this type of barometer can be easily made at home.

=== Mercury barometers ===
A mercury barometer is an instrument used to measure atmospheric pressure in a certain location and has a vertical glass tube closed at the top sitting in an open mercury-filled basin at the bottom. Mercury in the tube adjusts until the weight of it balances the atmospheric force exerted on the reservoir. High atmospheric pressure places more force on the reservoir, forcing mercury higher in the column. Low pressure allows the mercury to drop to a lower level in the column by lowering the force placed on the reservoir. Since higher temperature levels around the instrument will reduce the density of the mercury, the scale for reading the height of the mercury is adjusted to compensate for this effect. The tube has to be at least as long as the amount dipping in the mercury + head space + the maximum length of the column.

Schematic drawing of a simple mercury barometer with vertical mercury column and reservoir at base

Torricelli documented that the height of the mercury in a barometer changed slightly each day and concluded that this was due to the changing pressure in the atmosphere. He wrote: "We live submerged at the bottom of an ocean of elementary air, which is known by incontestable experiments to have weight". Inspired by Torricelli, Otto von Guericke on 5 December 1660 found that air pressure was unusually low and predicted a storm, which occurred the next day.

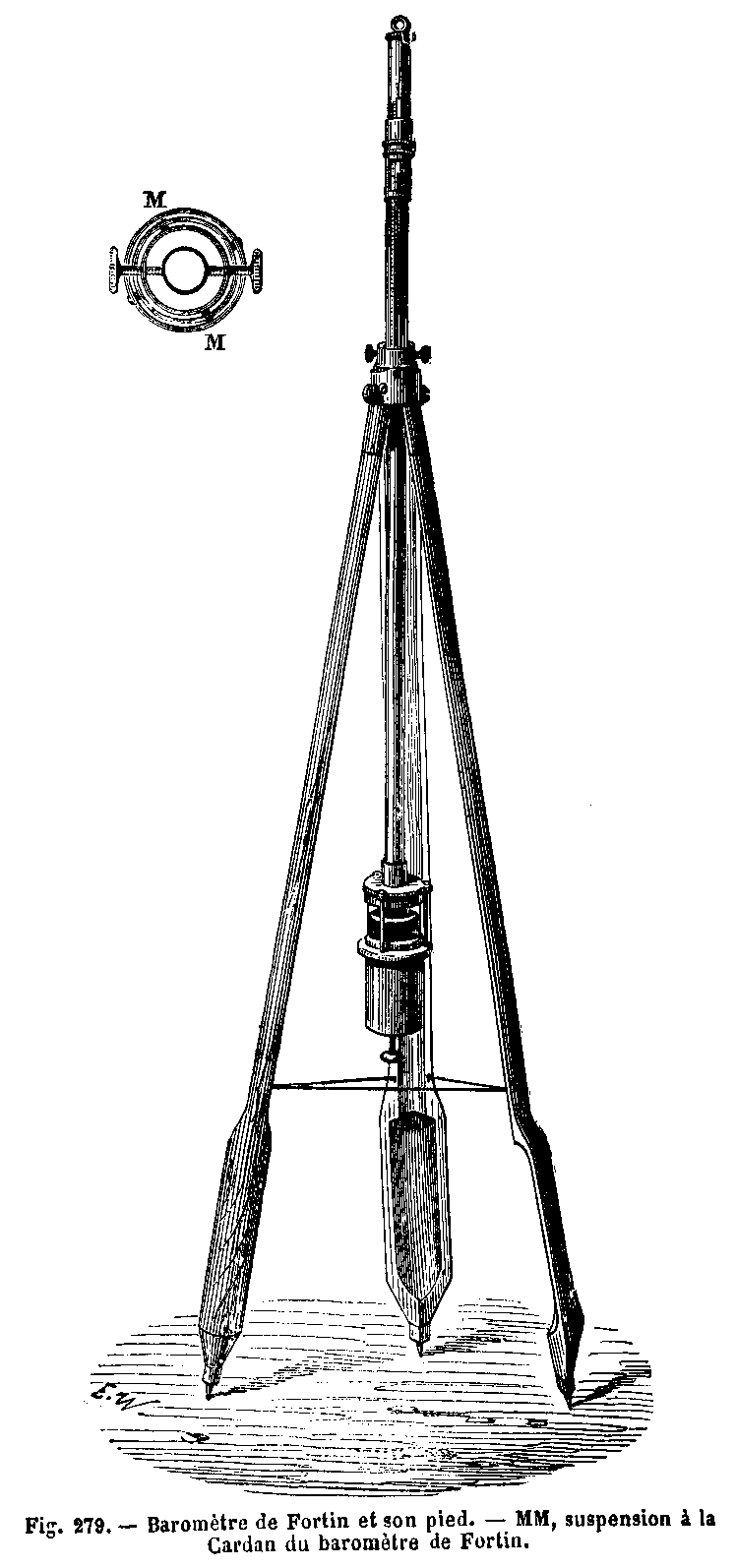
Fortin barometer

The mercury barometer's design gives rise to the expression of atmospheric pressure in inches or millimeters of mercury (mmHg). A torr was originally defined as 1 mmHg. The pressure is quoted as the level of the mercury's height in the vertical column. Typically, atmospheric pressure is measured between 26.5 inches (670 mm) and 31.5 inches (800 mm) of Hg. One atmosphere (1 atm) is equivalent to 29.92 inches (760 mm) of mercury.

Design changes to make the instrument more sensitive, simpler to read, and easier to transport resulted in variations such as the basin, siphon, wheel, cistern, Fortin, multiple folded, stereometric, and balance barometers.

In 2007, a European Union directive was enacted to restrict the use of mercury in new measuring instruments intended for the general public, effectively ending the production of new mercury barometers in Europe. The repair and trade of antiques (produced before late 1957) remained unrestricted.

==== Fitzroy barometer ====
Fitzroy barometers combine the standard mercury barometer with a thermometer, as well as a guide of how to interpret pressure changes.

==== Fortin barometer ====
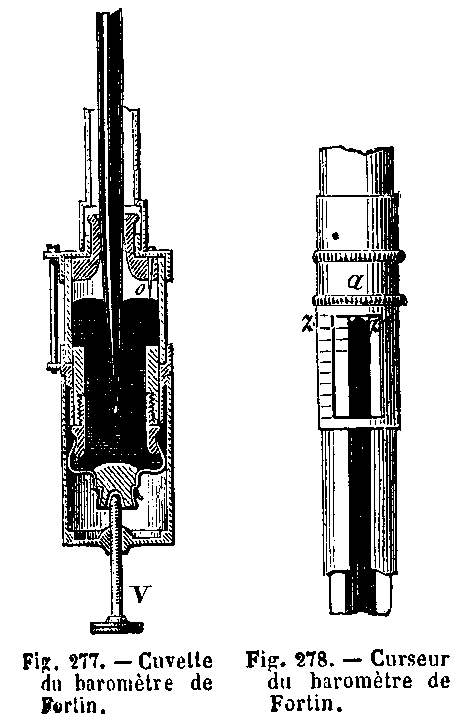
Reservoir of a Fortin barometer

Fortin barometers use a variable displacement mercury cistern, usually constructed with a thumbscrew pressing on a leather diaphragm bottom (V in the diagram). This compensates for displacement of mercury in the column with varying pressure. To use a Fortin barometer, the level of mercury is set to zero by using the thumbscrew to make an ivory pointer (O in the diagram) just touch the surface of the mercury. The pressure is then read on the column by adjusting the vernier scale so that the mercury just touches the sightline at Z. Some models also employ a valve for closing the cistern, enabling the mercury column to be forced to the top of the column for transport. This prevents water-hammer damage to the column in transit.

=== Sympiesometer ===
Sympiesometer inscribed at bottom Improved sympiesometer and at top A R Easton, 53 Marischal Street, Aberdeen. Owned by descendants of the Aberdeen shipbuilding Hall family.

A sympiesometer is a compact and lightweight barometer that was widely used on ships in the early 19th century. The sensitivity of this barometer was also used to measure altitude.

Sympiesometers have two parts. One is a traditional mercury thermometer that is needed to calculate the expansion or contraction of the fluid in the barometer. The other is the barometer, consisting of a J-shaped tube open at the lower end and closed at the top, with small reservoirs at both ends of the tube.

In 1778, Blondeau developed an iron tube barometer using narrow-bore musket barrels. This design resulted in a durable and polished instrument that resisted mercury corrosion and minimized breakage from the ship's movement.

=== Marine barometer ===
The need for a practical marine barometer arose from the urgent necessity of weather prediction at sea, where sailors faced frequent, and often dangerous, changes in wind, calm, and storm conditions. Traditional mercury barometers, though useful on land, proved unreliable on ships due to their susceptibility to the ship's motion. Oscillations caused the mercury to strike the top of the glass tube, leading to frequent breakage and making air pressure readings nearly impossible to interpret accurately during voyages.

Roger North observed that many, including Robert Hooke, attempted to resolve these issues but often abandoned the endeavor due to technical limitations. Nonetheless, Hooke remained persistent, proposing several adaptations including narrowing the open end of the siphon tube and exploring spiral tube designs. His most notable contribution was the creation of a double thermometer marine barometer, also referred to as a manometer, which was presented to the Royal Society in 1668 and constructed by Henry Hunt.

Hooke's marine barometer marked a turning point in the development of nautical meteorological tools. It featured a compact, affordable design tailored for maritime use, becoming the first instrument specifically constructed for sailors. The device combined a sealed spirit thermometer with an open air-based thermometer, calibrated to reflect barometric pressure changes through liquid displacement. Hooke's use of hydrogen-filled containers and colorful almond oil further enhanced visibility and responsiveness. Notably, Edmund Halley tested this prototype on his South Atlantic voyage from 1698 to 1700 and praised its reliability in forecasting weather changes. His endorsement led to greater interest and validation by the Royal Society. Figure 8 below is from this report, depicting the Hooke Barometer, with detailed description in the writing.

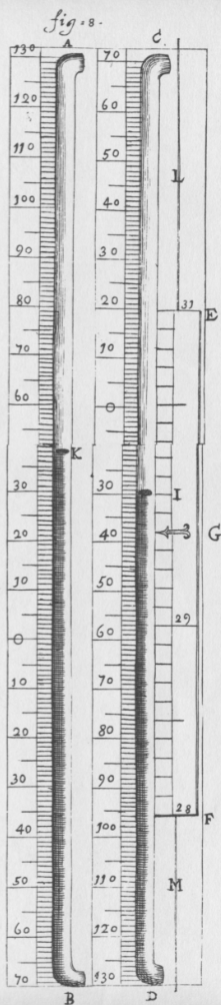
Figure 8 from Robert Hooke's Barometer Invention

Building on Hooke's foundation, John Patrick sought to improve the design by replacing the water with mercury, advertising his version as a "new marine barometer." Though some criticized it for the difficulty of reading the mercury column due to shipboard vibrations, navigator Christopher Middleton employed it during expeditions to Hudson's Bay. He consistently found it effective in forecasting storms, wind changes, and even the proximity of ice.

A significant advancement occurred during Captain James Cook's renowned voyages in the late 18th century. As part of preparations for Cook's second Pacific expedition (1772–1775), the Board of Longitude and the Royal Society commissioned the production of marine barometers. Renowned instrument maker Edward Nairne was chosen to supply the equipment. Contrary to expectations for spiral tubes, Nairne opted for straight, constricted tubes mounted on boards, coupled with a gimbaled suspension system to ensure vertical orientation and stability at sea.

Nairne's design represented a leap in functionality. The narrow bore significantly reduced mercury motion, enabling more accurate readings even in turbulent conditions. These instruments proved so reliable that they were adopted not only by the Royal Navy but also by international expeditions. The East India Company, Russian explorers, and French and Spanish navigators, including Jean-François de Galaup, comte de Lapérouse (voyage in 1785) and Alessandro Malaspina (voyage in 1789), incorporated variants of Nairne's barometer into their voyages.

Despite the widespread use of Nairne's marine barometer, it was not without limitations. Lapérouse lauded the device's predictive capabilities but also noted inconsistencies in mercury behavior, highlighting the complexity of translating instrument readings into reliable forecasts. In response to the fragility of glass tubes, other scientists, such as Le Roy, proposed alternate models like the folded Huygens barometer, designed for enhanced durability and reduced oscillation aboard ships.

The marine barometer's practical value was reaffirmed in 1801 when the Royal Society sent Captain Matthew Flinders on a three-year voyage from New Holland to New South Wales, equipped with one of Nairne's barometers. In his official correspondence, Flinders confirmed the instrument's success and expressed appreciation for its stability and precision in recording atmospheric conditions.

Throughout its evolution, the marine barometer transitioned from a theoretical invention to a critical navigational and meteorological tool. Its development not only reflected ingenuity in overcoming the challenges of shipboard instrumentation but also underscored its importance in the broader context of global exploration. These devices empowered mariners to make informed decisions, contributing to safer and more efficient voyages across the world's oceans.

==== Wheel barometers ====
A wheel barometer uses a "J" tube sealed at the top of the longer limb. The shorter limb is open to the atmosphere, and floating on top of the mercury there is a small glass float. A fine silken thread is attached to the float which passes up over a wheel and then back down to a counterweight (usually protected in another tube). The wheel turns the point on the front of the barometer. As atmospheric pressure increases, mercury moves from the short to the long limb, the float falls, and the pointer moves. When pressure falls, the mercury moves back, lifting the float and turning the dial the other way.

Around 1810 the wheel barometer, which could be read from a great distance, became the first practical and commercial instrument favoured by farmers and the educated classes in the UK. The face of the barometer was circular with a simple dial pointing to an easily readable scale: "Rain - Change - Dry" with the "Change" at the top centre of the dial. Later models added a barometric scale with finer graduations: "Stormy (28 inches of mercury), Much Rain (28.5), Rain (29), Change (29.5), Fair (30), Set fair (30.5), very dry (31)".

Natalo Aiano is recognised as one of the finest makers of wheel barometers, an early pioneer in a wave of artisanal Italian instrument and barometer makers that were encouraged to emigrate to the UK. He listed as working in Holborn, London c. 1785–1805. From 1770 onwards, a large number of Italians came to England because they were accomplished glass blowers or instrument makers. By 1840 it was fair to say that the Italians dominated the industry in England.

=== Vacuum pump oil barometer ===
Using vacuum pump oil as the working fluid in a barometer has led to the creation of the new "World's Tallest Barometer" in February 2013. The barometer at Portland State University (PSU) uses doubly distilled vacuum pump oil and has a nominal height of about 12.4 m for the oil column height; expected excursions are in the range of ±0.4 m over the course of a year. Vacuum pump oil has very low vapour pressure and is available in a range of densities; the lowest density vacuum oil was chosen for the PSU barometer to maximize the oil column height.

=== Aneroid barometers ===
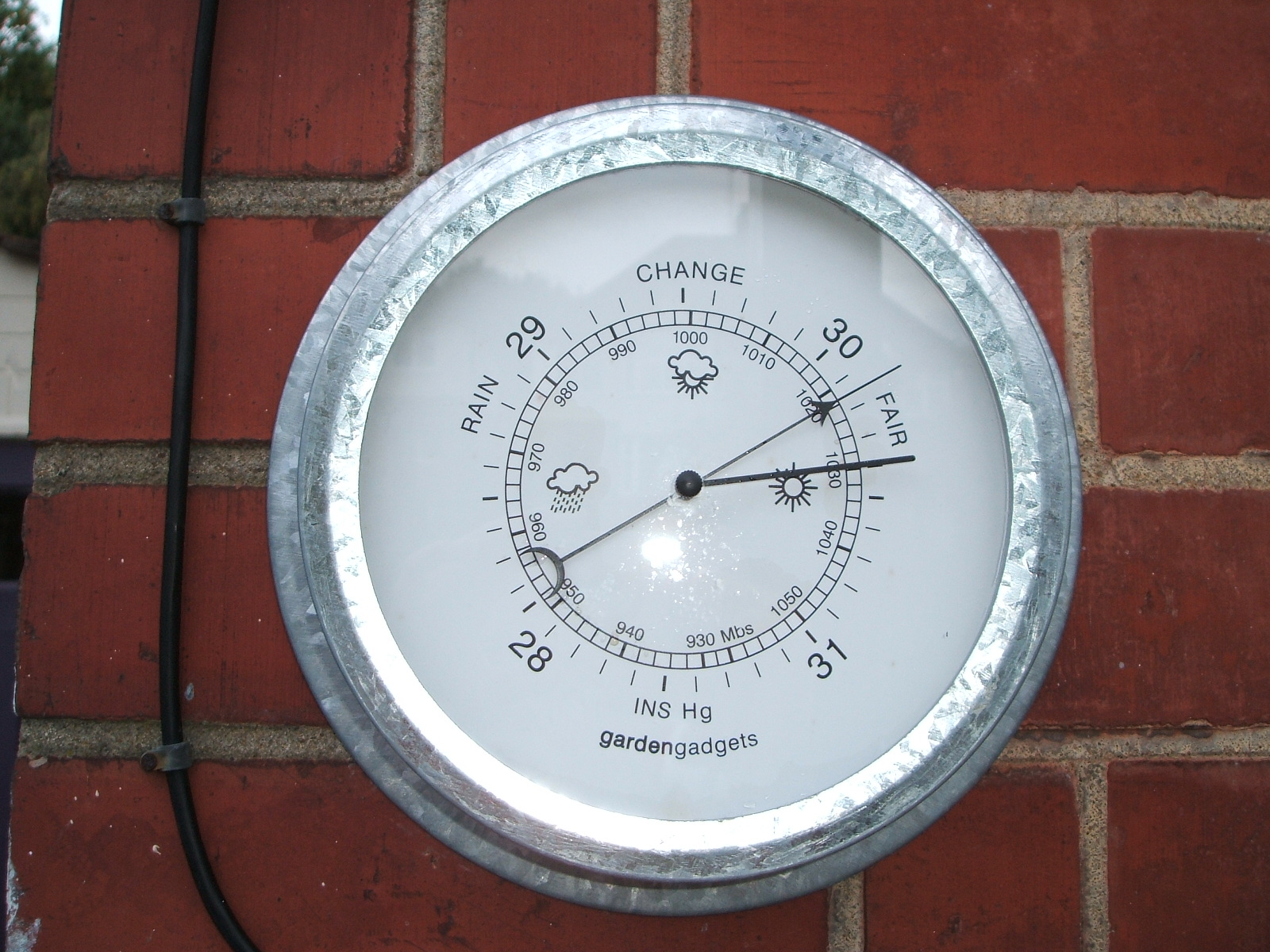
Aneroid barometer

An Aneroid barometer is an instrument used for measuring air pressure via a method that does not involve liquid. Although Gottfried Wilhelm Leibniz first proposed the concept of an aneroid barometer around 1700, it was not until 1844 that French scientist Lucien Vidi successfully invented it. The aneroid barometer uses a small, flexible metal box called an aneroid cell (capsule), which is made from an alloy of beryllium and copper. The evacuated capsule (or usually several capsules, stacked to add up their movements) is prevented from collapsing by a strong spring. Small changes in external air pressure cause the cell to expand or contract. This expansion and contraction drives mechanical levers such that the tiny movements of the capsule are amplified and displayed on the face of the aneroid barometer. Many models include a manually set needle which is used to mark the current measurement so that a relative change can be seen. This type of barometer is common in homes and in recreational boats. It is also used in meteorology, mostly in barographs, and as a pressure instrument in radiosondes.

==== Barographs ====
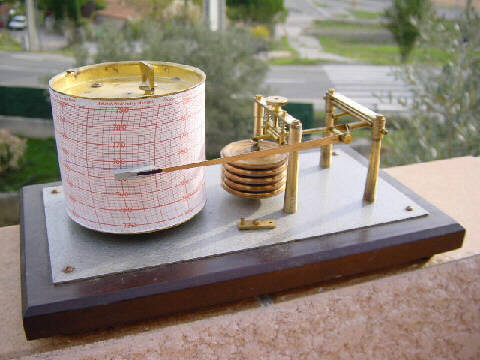
Analogue recording barograph using five stacked aneroid barometer cells

A barograph is a recording aneroid barometer where the changes in atmospheric pressure are recorded on a paper chart.

The principle of the barograph is same as that of the aneroid barometer. Whereas the barometer displays the pressure on a dial, the barograph uses the small movements of the box to transmit by a system of levers to a recording arm that has at its extreme end either a scribe or a pen. A scribe records on smoked foil while a pen records on paper using ink, held in a nib. The recording material is mounted on a cylindrical drum which is rotated slowly by a clock. Commonly, the drum makes one revolution per day, per week, or per month, and the rotation rate can often be selected by the user.

=== MEMS barometers ===
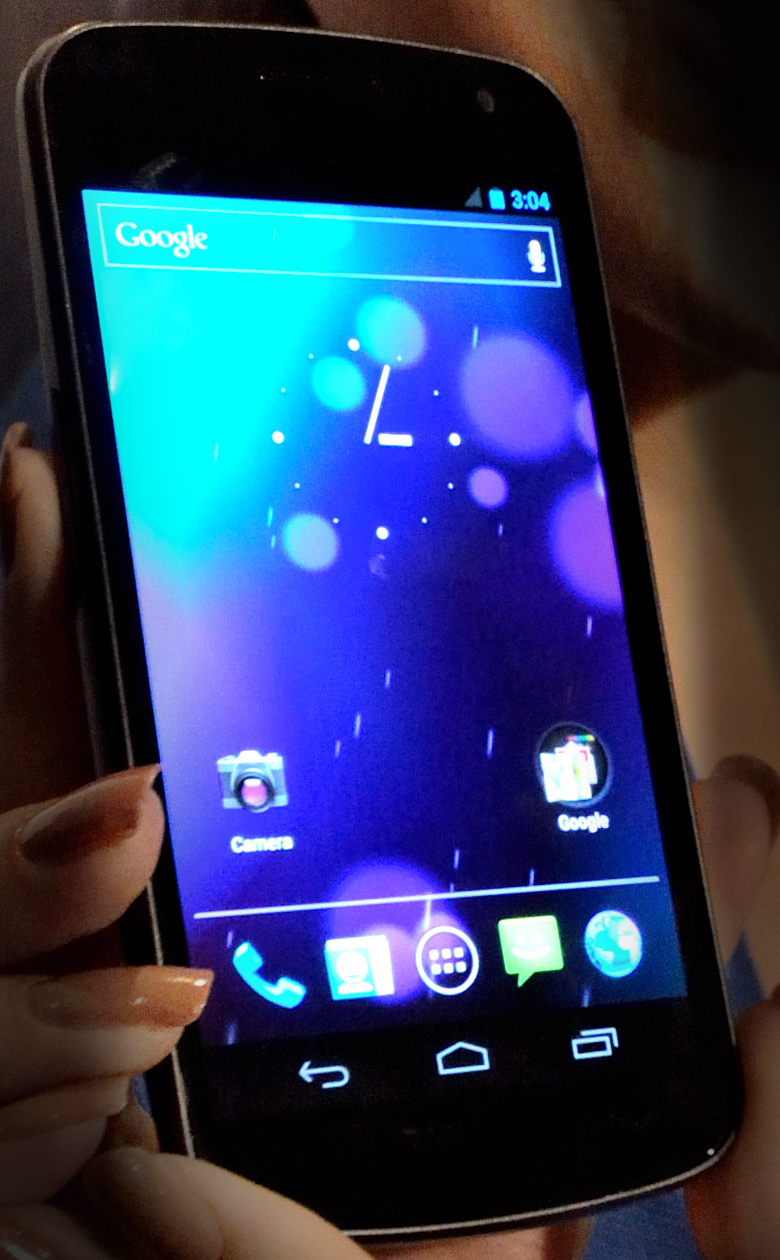
The Galaxy Nexus has a built-in barometer

Microelectromechanical systems (or MEMS) barometers are extremely small devices between 1 and 100 micrometres in size (0.001 to 0.1 mm). They are created via photolithography or photochemical machining. Typical applications include miniaturized weather stations, electronic barometers and altimeters.

A barometer can also be found in smartphones such as the Samsung Galaxy Nexus, Samsung Galaxy S3-S6, Motorola Xoom, Apple iPhone 6 and newer iPhones, and Timex Expedition WS4 smartwatch, based on MEMS and piezoresistive pressure-sensing technologies. Inclusion of barometers on smartphones was originally intended to provide a faster GPS lock. However, third party researchers were unable to confirm additional GPS accuracy or lock speed due to barometric readings. The researchers suggest that the inclusion of barometers in smartphones may provide a solution for determining a user's elevation, but also suggest that several pitfalls must first be overcome.

=== More unusual barometers ===
Timex Expedition WS4 in Barometric chart mode with weather forecast function

There are many other more unusual types of barometer. From variations on the storm barometer, such as the Collins Patent Table Barometer, to more traditional-looking designs such as Hooke's Otheometer and the Ross Sympiesometer. Some, such as the Shark Oil barometer, work only in a certain temperature range, achieved in warmer climates.

== Applications ==
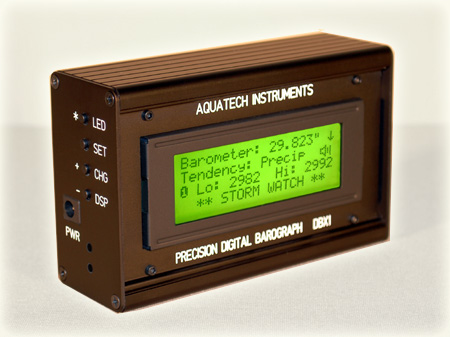
Digital graphing barometer

Barometric pressure and the pressure tendency (the change of pressure over time) have been used in weather forecasting since the late 19th century. When used in combination with wind observations, reasonably accurate short-term forecasts can be made. Simultaneous barometric readings from across a network of weather stations allow maps of air pressure to be produced, which were the first form of the modern weather map when created in the 19th century. Isobars, lines of equal pressure, when drawn on such a map, give a contour map showing areas of high and low pressure. Localized high atmospheric pressure acts as a barrier to approaching weather systems, diverting their course. Atmospheric lift caused by low-level wind convergence into the surface brings clouds and sometimes precipitation. The larger the change in pressure, especially if more than 3.5 hPa (0.1 inHg), the greater the change in weather that can be expected. If the pressure drop is rapid, a low pressure system is approaching, and there is a greater chance of rain. Rapid pressure rises, such as in the wake of a cold front, are associated with improving weather conditions, such as clearing skies.

With falling air pressure, gases trapped within the coal in deep mines can escape more freely. Thus low pressure increases the risk of firedamp accumulating. Collieries therefore keep track of the pressure. In the case of the Trimdon Grange colliery disaster of 1882 the mines inspector drew attention to the records and in the report stated "the conditions of atmosphere and temperature may be taken to have reached a dangerous point".

Aneroid barometers are used in scuba diving. A submersible pressure gauge is used to keep track of the contents of the diver's air tank. Another gauge is used to measure the hydrostatic pressure, usually expressed as a depth of sea water. Either or both gauges may be replaced with electronic variants or a dive computer.

== Compensations ==
=== Temperature ===
The density of mercury depends on temperature, so readings must be adjusted for the temperature of the instrument. For this purpose mercury thermometers may be mounted on barometers. Temperature compensation of an aneroid barometer can be accomplished by including a bi-metal element in the mechanical linkages. Inexpensive aneroid barometers sold for domestic use typically are manufactured to be accurate at room temperature, and have no provision for further adjustment for temperature.

=== Altitude ===
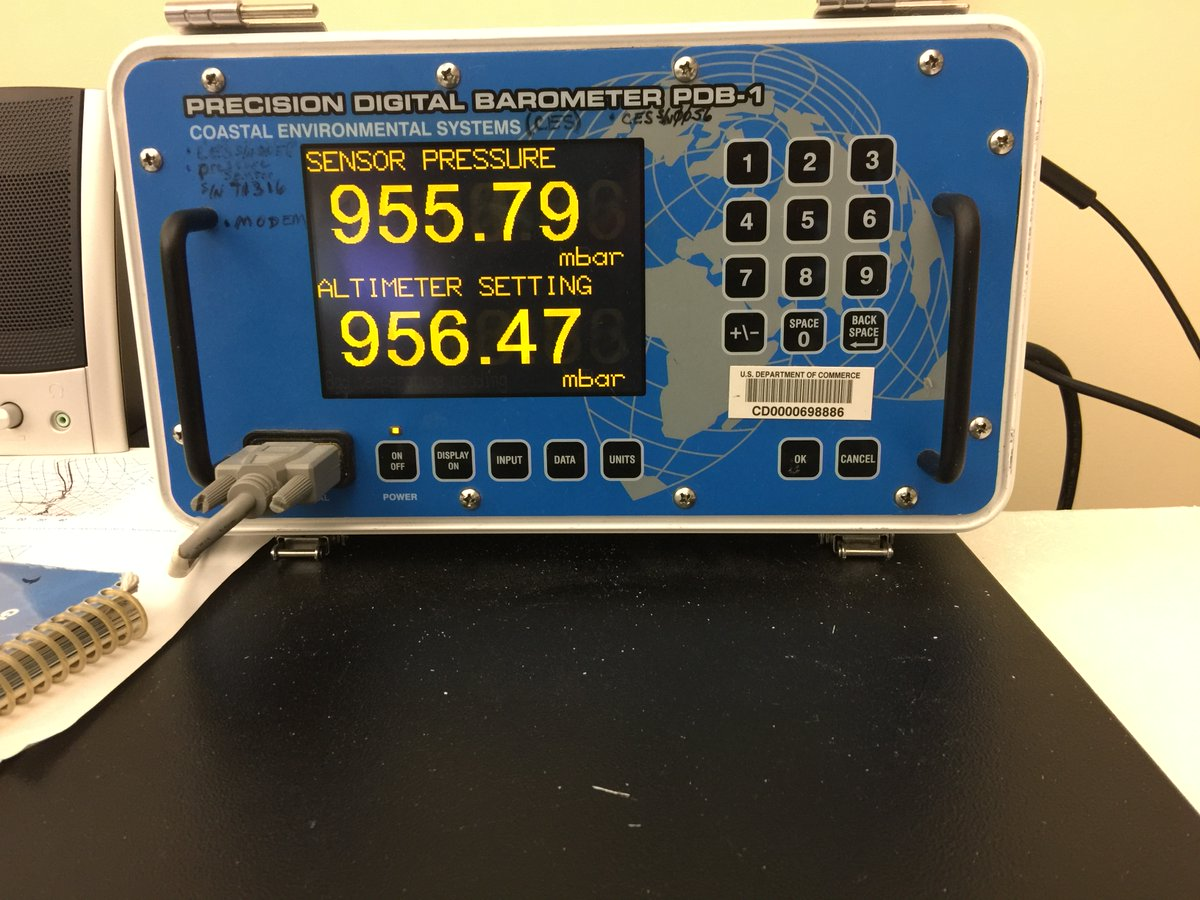
A digital barometer with altimeter setting (for correction) displayed

As the air pressure decreases at altitudes above sea level (and increases below sea level) the uncorrected reading of the barometer will depend on its location. The reading is then adjusted to an equivalent sea-level pressure for purposes of reporting. For example, if a barometer located at sea level and under fair weather conditions is moved to an altitude of 1,000 feet (305 m), about 1 inch of mercury (~35 hPa) must be added on to the reading. The barometer readings at the two locations should be the same if there are negligible changes in time, horizontal distance, and temperature. If this were not done, there would be a false indication of an approaching storm at the higher elevation.

Aneroid barometers have a mechanical adjustment that allows the equivalent sea level pressure to be read directly and without further adjustment if the instrument is not moved to a different altitude. Setting an aneroid barometer is similar to resetting an analog clock that is not at the correct time. Its dial is rotated so that the current atmospheric pressure from a known accurate and nearby barometer (such as the local weather station) is displayed. No calculation is needed, as the source barometer reading has already been converted to equivalent sea-level pressure, and this is transferred to the barometer being set—regardless of its altitude. Though somewhat rare, a few aneroid barometers intended for monitoring the weather are calibrated to manually adjust for altitude. In this case, knowing either the altitude or the current atmospheric pressure would be sufficient for future accurate readings.

The table below shows examples for three locations in the city of San Francisco, California. Note the corrected barometer readings are identical, and based on equivalent sea-level pressure. (Assume a temperature of 15 °C.)

Location	Altitude (feet)	Uncorrected P_{atm} (inches Hg)	Corrected P_{atm} (inches Hg)	Altitude (metres)	Uncorrected P_{atm} (hPa)	Corrected P_{atm} (hPa)
City Marina	(Sea Level) 0	29.92	29.92	0	1013 hPa	1013 hPa
Nob Hill	348	29.55	29.92	106	1001 hPa	1013 hPa
Mt. Davidson	928	28.94	29.92	283	980 hPa	1013 hPa

In 1787, during a scientific expedition on Mont Blanc, De Saussure undertook research and executed physical experiments on the boiling point of water at different heights. He calculated the height at each of his experiments by measuring how long it took an alcohol burner to boil an amount of water, and by these means he determined the height of the mountain to be 4775 metres. (This later turned out to be 32 metres less than the actual height of 4807 metres). For these experiments De Saussure brought specific scientific equipment, such as a barometer and thermometer. His calculated boiling temperature of water at the top of the mountain was fairly accurate, only off by 0.1 kelvin.

Based on his findings, the pressure altimeter was developed as a specific application of the barometer. In the mid-19th century, this method was used by explorers.

== Equation ==
When atmospheric pressure is measured by a barometer, the pressure is also referred to as the "barometric pressure". Assume a barometer with a cross-sectional area A, a height h, filled with mercury from the bottom at Point B to the top at Point C. The pressure at the bottom of the barometer, Point B, is equal to the atmospheric pressure. The pressure at the very top, Point C, can be taken as zero because there is only mercury vapour above this point and its pressure is very low relative to the atmospheric pressure. Therefore, one can find the atmospheric pressure using the barometer and this equation:

P_{atm} = ρgh

where ρ is the density of mercury, g is the gravitational acceleration, and h is the height of the mercury column above the free surface area. The physical dimensions (length of tube and cross-sectional area of the tube) of the barometer itself have no effect on the height of the fluid column in the tube.

In thermodynamic calculations, a commonly used pressure unit is the "standard atmosphere". This is the pressure resulting from a column of mercury of 760 mm in height at 0 °C. For the density of mercury, use ρ_{Hg} = 13,595 kg/m^{3} and for gravitational acceleration use g = 9.807 m/s^{2}.

If water were used (instead of mercury) to meet the standard atmospheric pressure, a water column of roughly 10.3 m (33.8 ft) would be needed.

Standard atmospheric pressure as a function of elevation:

Note: 1 torr = 133.3 Pa = 0.03937 inHg

P_{atm} / kPa	Altitude (m)		P_{atm} / inHg	Altitude (ft)
101.325	(Sea Level) 0		29.92	(Sea Level) 0
97.71	305		28.86	1,000
94.21	610		27.82	2,000
89.88	1,000		26.55	3,281
84.31	1,524		24.90	5,000
79.50	2,000		23.48	6,562
69.68	3,048		20.58	10,000
54.05	5,000		15.96	16,404
46.56	6,096		13.75	20,000
37.65	7,620		11.12	25,000
32.77	8,848	*	9.68	29,029*
26.44	10,000		7.81	32,808
11.65	15,240		3.44	50,000
5.53	20,000		1.63	65,617
* Elevation of Mount Everest, the highest point on earth

== See also ==
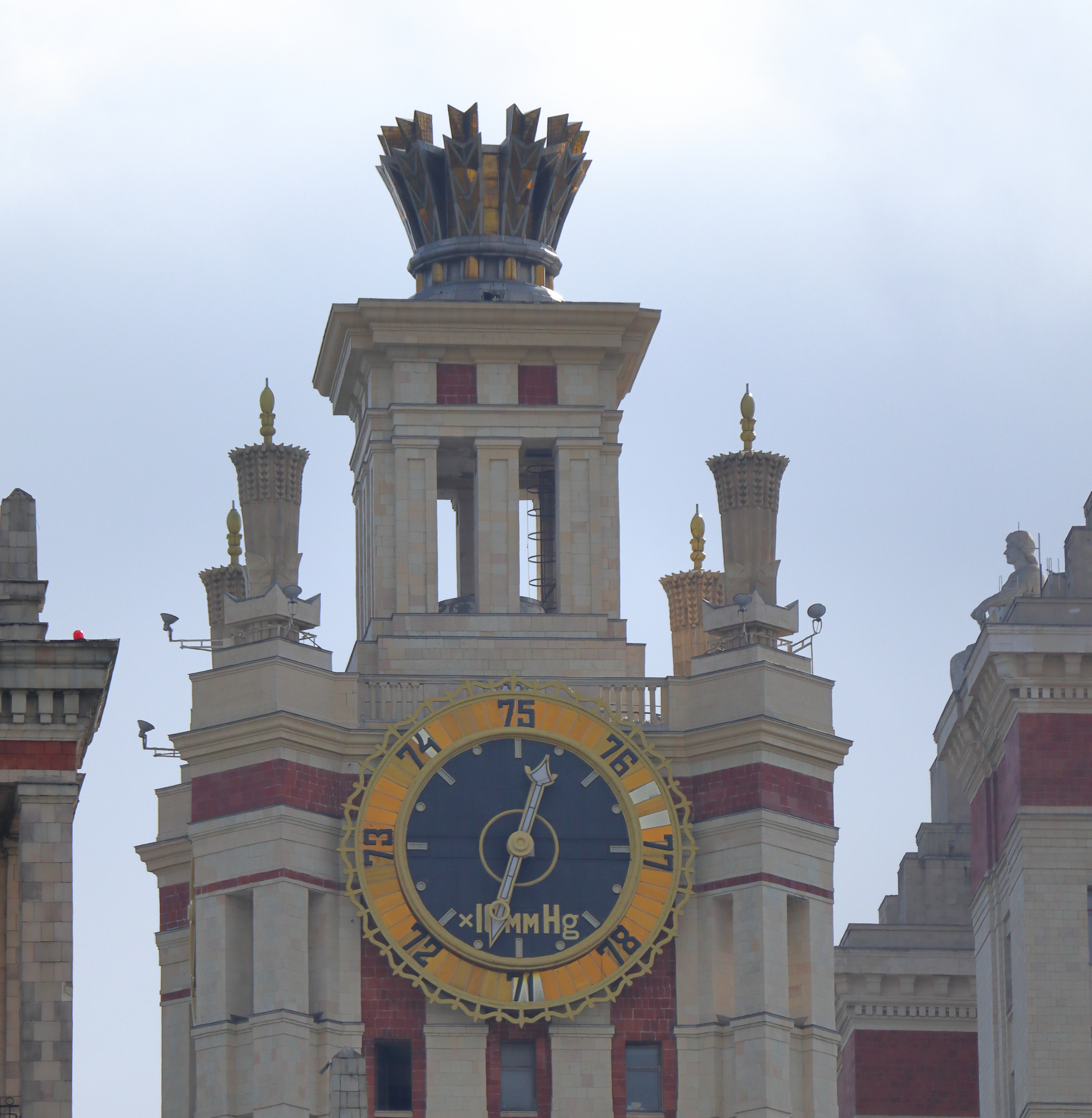
The tower barometer on one of the towers of the main building of the Moscow State University

- Anemoscope
- Automated airport weather station
- Barometer question
- Bert Bolle Barometer
- Microbarometer
- Storm glass
- Tempest prognosticator
- Units of pressure
- Zambretti Forecaster

== Patents ==
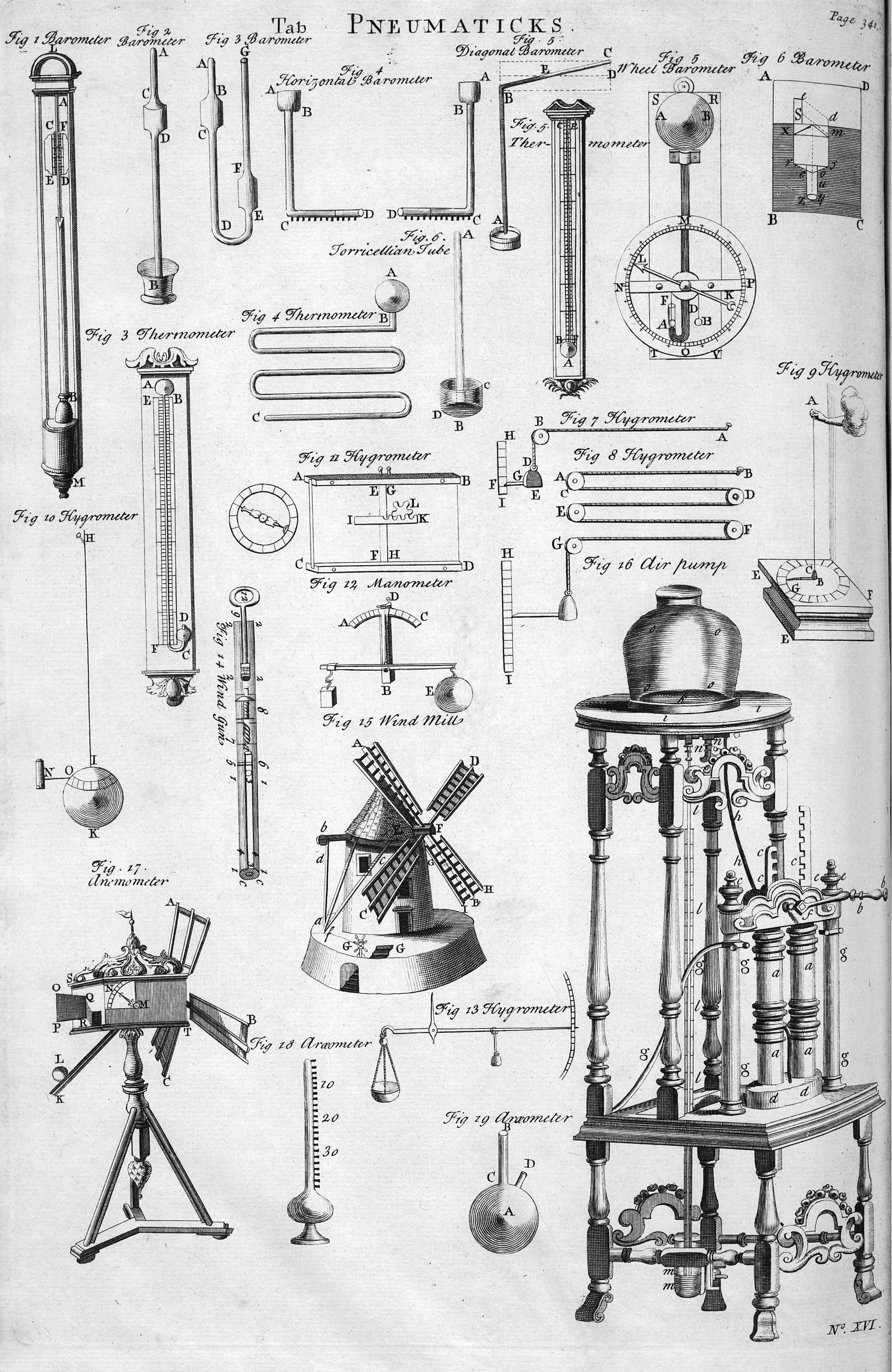
Table of Pneumaticks, 1728 Cyclopaedia

- US 2194624, G. A. Titterington, Jr, "Diaphragm pressure gauge having temperature compensating means", issued 1940-03-26, assigned to Bendix Aviat Corp
- U.S. patent 2,472,735: C. J. Ulrich: "Barometric instrument"
- U.S. patent 2,691,305: H. J. Frank: "Barometric altimeter"
- U.S. patent 3,273,398: D. C. W. T. Sharp: "Aneroid barometer"
- U.S. patent 3,397,578: H. A. Klumb: "Motion amplifying mechanism for pressure responsive instrument movement"
- U.S. patent 3,643,510: F. Lissau: "Fluid displacement pressure gauges"
- U.S. patent 4,106,342: O. S. Sormunen: "Pressure measuring instrument"
- U.S. patent 4,238,958: H. Dostmann: "Barometer"
- U.S. patent 4,327,583: T. Fijimoto: "Weather forecasting device"
