= Barometer question =

Exam question with one intended answer but many correct answers

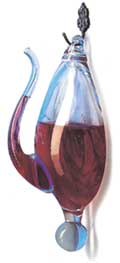
A storm glass or Goethe's device, an early practical type of barometer. Calandra's essay does not name the type of the device, although the answers provided by the student suggest the use of a portable aneroid barometer.

The barometer question is an example of an incorrectly designed examination question demonstrating functional fixedness that causes a moral dilemma for the examiner. In its classic form, popularized by American test designer professor Alexander Calandra in the 1960s, the question asked the student to "show how it is possible to determine the height of a tall building with the aid of a barometer." The examiner was confident that there was one, and only one, correct answer, which is found by measuring the difference in pressure at the top and bottom of the building and solving for height. Contrary to the examiner's expectations, the student responded with a series of completely different answers. These answers were also correct, yet none of them proved the student's competence in the specific academic field being tested.

The barometer question achieved the status of an urban legend; according to an internet meme, the question was asked at the University of Copenhagen and the student was Niels Bohr. The Kaplan, Inc. ACT preparation textbook describes it as an "MIT legend", and an early form is found in a 1958 American humor book. However, Calandra presented the incident as a real-life, first-person experience that occurred during the Sputnik crisis. Calandra's essay, "Angels on a Pin", was published in 1959 in Pride, a magazine of the American College Public Relations Association. It was reprinted in Current Science in 1964, in Saturday Review in 1968 and included in the 1969 edition of Calandra's The Teaching of Elementary Science and Mathematics. Calandra's essay became a subject of academic discussion. It was frequently reprinted since 1970, making its way into books on subjects ranging from teaching, writing skills, workplace counseling and investment in real estate to chemical industry, computer programming and integrated circuit design.

== Calandra's account ==
A colleague of Calandra posed the barometer question to a student, expecting a single correct answer: "the height of the building can be estimated in proportion to the difference between the barometer readings at the bottom and at the top of the building". The student provided a different, and also correct answer: "Take the barometer to the top of the building. Attach a long rope to it, lower the barometer to the street, then bring it up, measuring the length of the rope. The length of the rope is the height of the building."

The examiner and Calandra, who was called to advise on the case, faced a moral dilemma. According to the format of the exam, a correct answer deserved a full credit. But issuing a full credit would have violated academic standards by rewarding a student who had not demonstrated competence in the academic field that had been tested (physics). Neither of two available options (pass or fail) was morally acceptable.

By mutual agreement with the student and the examiner, Calandra gave the student another opportunity to answer, warning the student the answer would require demonstrating some knowledge of physics. The student came up with several possible answers, but settled on dropping the barometer from the top of the building, timing its fall, and using the equation of motion $d = \tfrac12 {a}t^2$ to derive the height. The examiner agreed that this satisfied the requirement and gave the student “almost full credit”.

When Calandra asked about the other answers, the student gave the examples:

- using the proportion between the lengths of the building's shadow and that of the barometer to calculate the building's height from the height of the barometer
- using the barometer as a measuring rod to mark off its height on the wall while climbing the stairs, then counting the number of marks
- suspending the barometer from a string to create a pendulum, then using the pendulum to measure the strength of Earth's gravity at the top and bottom of the building, and calculating the height of the building from the difference in the two measurements (see Newton's law of universal gravitation)

There were, the student said, many other possible solutions.

“Probably the best,” he said, is to take the barometer to the basement and knock on the superintendent’s door. When the superintendent answers, you speak to him as follows: ‘Mr. Superintendent, here I have a fine barometer, if you will tell me the height of the building, I will give you this barometer.”

The student admitted that he knew the expected “conventional” answer, but was fed up with the professor's "teaching him how to think ... rather than teaching him the structure of the subject."

== Mention by James Fixx ==
Jim Fixx's book Games for the Superintelligent includes a version of the barometer story.

== Internet meme ==
According to Snopes.com, more recent (1999 and 1988) versions identify the problem as a question in "a physics degree exam at the University of Copenhagen" and the student was Niels Bohr, and includes the following answers:

- Tying a piece of string to the barometer, lowering the barometer from the roof to the ground, and measuring the length of the string and barometer.
- Dropping the barometer off the roof, measuring the time it takes to hit the ground, and calculating the building's height assuming constant acceleration under gravity.
- When the sun is shining, standing the barometer up, measuring the height of the barometer and the lengths of the shadows of both barometer and building, and finding the building's height using similar triangles.
- Tying a piece of string to the barometer, and swinging it like a pendulum both on the ground and on the roof, and from the known pendulum length and swing period, calculate the gravitational field for the two cases. Use Newton's law of gravitation to calculate the radial altitude of both the ground and the roof. The difference will be the height of the building.
- Tying a piece of string to the barometer, which is as long as the height of the building, and swinging it like a pendulum, and from the swing period, calculate the pendulum length.
- Marking off the number of barometer lengths vertically along the emergency staircase, and multiplying this with the length of the barometer.
- Trading the barometer for the correct information with the building's janitor or superintendent.
- Measuring the pressure difference between ground and roof and calculating the height difference (the expected answer).

== Interpretations ==
Professor of physics Mark Silverman used what he called "The Barometer-Story formula" precisely for explaining the subject of pressure and recommended it to physics teachers. Silverman called Calandra's story "a delightful essay that I habitually read to my class whenever we study fluids ... the essay is short, hilarious and satisfying (at least to me and my class)."

Financial advisor Robert G. Allen presented Calandra's essay to illustrate the process and role of creativity in finance. "Creativity is born when you have a problem to solve. And as you can see from this story ["Angels on a Pin"] there are many ways of solving a problem. Creativity is the art of looking for solutions that are out of the ordinary, different, unorthodox."

O'Meara used the barometer question to illustrate the art of steering students' activities to a desired outcome: "if the question is not aligned [with the desired learning outcome] then the problem becomes an exercise of problem solving for its own value." The teacher can steer the students either through careful design of the questions (this rules out barometer questions), or through guiding the students to the desired choices. In case of the original barometer question, the examiner may explicitly say that the problem has more than one solution, insist on applying the laws of physics, or give them the "ending point" of the solution: "How did I discover that the building was 410 feet in height with only a barometer?"

Herson used the Calandra account as an illustration of the difference between academic tests and assessment in education. Tests, even the ones designed for reliability and validity, are useful, but they are not sufficient in real-world education.

Sanders interpreted Calandra's story as a conflict between perfection and optimal solutions: "We struggle to determine a 'best' answer, when a simple call to a building superintendent (the resource man) would quickly provide adequate information."

== See also ==
- Manhole cover question
- Microsoft interview
