= Tempest prognosticator =

Meteorological device

How Leeches Predicted Storms — zackdfilms
- https://youtube.com/shorts/5CZE0tNekgE

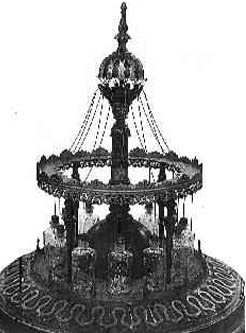
The Tempest Prognosticator

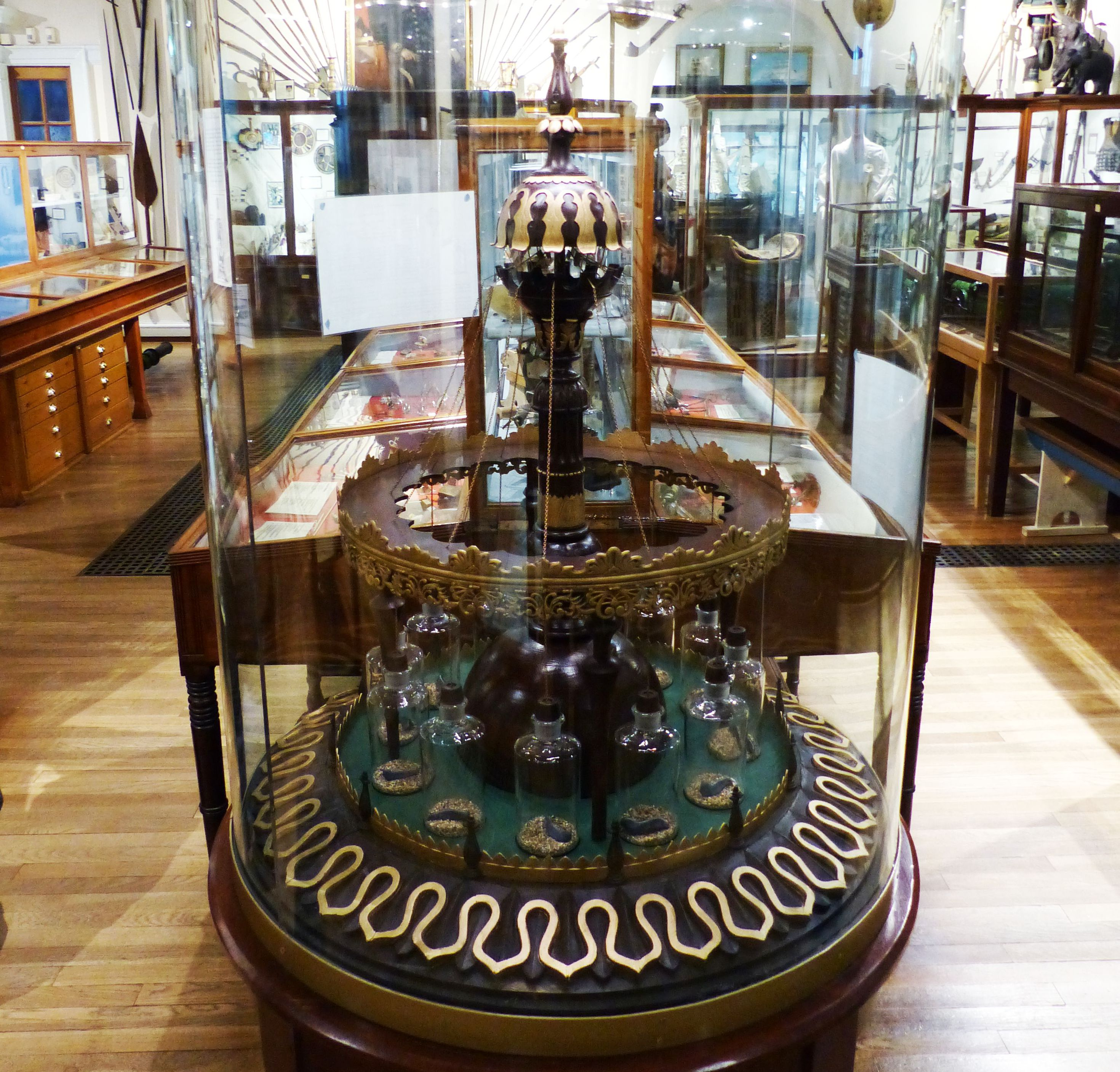
1951 Festival of Britain Replica Tempest Prognosticator

The tempest prognosticator, also known as the leech barometer, is a 19th-century invention by George Merryweather in which leeches are used in a barometer. The twelve leeches are kept in small bottles inside the device; when they become agitated by an approaching storm, they attempt to climb out of the bottles and trigger a small hammer which strikes a bell. The likelihood of a storm is indicated by the number of times the bell is struck.

== Invention and development ==
Dr. Merryweather, honorary curator of the Whitby Literary and Philosophical Society's Museum, detailed the sensitivity that medicinal leeches displayed in reaction to electrical conditions in the atmosphere. He was inspired by two lines from Edward Jenner's poem Signs of Rain: "The leech disturbed is newly risen; Quite to the summit of his prison." Merryweather spent much of 1850 developing his ideas and came up with six designs for what he originally referred to as "An Atmospheric Electromagnetic Telegraph, conducted by Animal Instinct." These ranged from a cheap version, which he envisaged would be used by the government and the shipping industries, to a more expensive design. The expensive design, which took inspiration from the architecture of Indian temples, was made by local craftsmen and shown in the 1851 Great Exhibition at The Crystal Palace in London.

On 27 February 1851, he gave a nearly three-hour essay to members of the Philosophical Society entitled "Essay explanatory of the Tempest Prognosticator in the building of the Great Exhibition for the Works of Industry of All Nations."

== Method ==
The tempest prognosticator comprises twelve pint bottles in a circle around and beneath a large bell. Atop the glasses are small metal tubes which contain a piece of whalebone and a wire connecting them to small hammers positioned to strike the bell. In his essay Merryweather described the workings of the device:

After having arranged this mouse trap contrivance, into each bottle was poured rain water, to the height of an inch and a half; and a leech placed in every bottle, which was to be its future residence; and when influenced by the electromagnetic state of the atmosphere a number of leeches ascended into the tubes; in doing which they dislodged the whalebone and caused the bell to ring.

— George Merryweather

The leech would have difficulty entering the metal tubes but would endeavour to do so if sufficiently motivated by the likelihood of bad weather. By ringing the bell it would signify that that individual leech is indicating that a storm is approaching. Merryweather referred to the leeches as his "jury of philosophical councilors" and that the more of them that rang the bell the more likely that a storm would occur.

In his essay Merryweather also noted other features of the design, including the fact that the leeches were placed in glass bottles placed in a circle to prevent them from feeling "the affliction of solitary confinement".

== Accuracy and success ==
Merryweather spent all of 1850 testing the device, sending a letter to the president of the Philosophical Society and the Whitby Institute, Henry Belcher, to warn him of an impending storm. The results of 28 of these predictions are kept in the library of Whitby Museum. Merryweather stated in his essay the great success that he had had with the device.

Merryweather lobbied for the government to make use of his design around the British coastline but they instead opted for Robert FitzRoy's storm glass.

== Replicas ==
The original device has been lost, but at least three replicas have been made. The hundredth anniversary of the invention brought renewed interest as a replica was made for the 1951 Festival of Britain. This non-working version was made from the description in a printed copy of Merryweather's essay and a copperplate drawing of the original. The device was shown in the Dome of Discovery and given to the Whitby Philosophical Society when the festival ended. This replica is still on display at Whitby Museum. Plans and photographs of this replica were then used to create faithful working models, one of which is on display at the UK National Meteorological Library and Archive at the Met Office in Exeter, Devon, and another at the Great Dickens Christmas Fair in San Francisco.

== See also ==
- Miner's canary
- Frog battery
- Pasilalinic-sympathetic compass
- Project Pigeon
