= Storm glass =

Proposed meteorological instrument

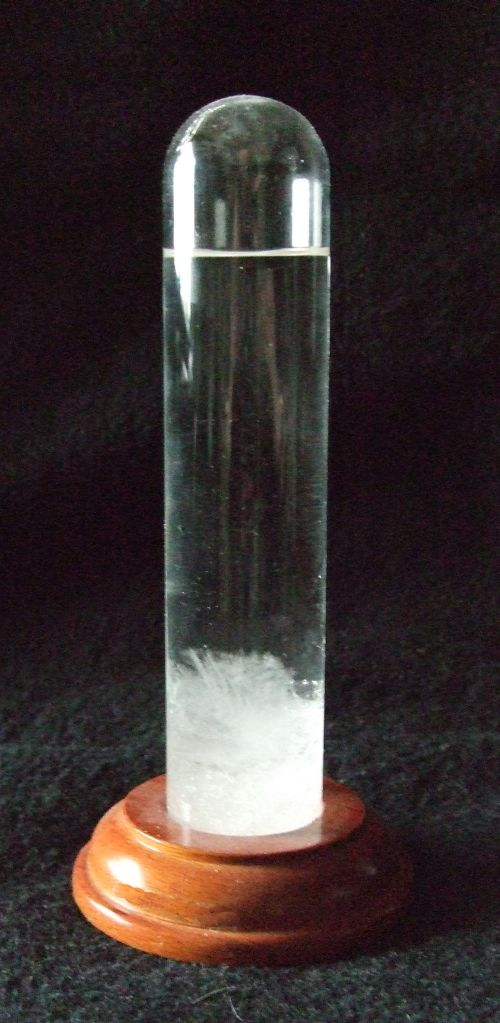
A FitzRoy storm glass

The storm glass or chemical weather glass was an instrument claimed to help predict weather. It consists of a special liquid placed inside a sealed transparent glass. The state of crystallization within the liquid was believed to be related to the weather.

The inventor is unknown but the device became popular in the 1860s after being promoted by Royal Navy Admiral Robert FitzRoy who claimed that "if fixed, undisturbed, in free air, not exposed to radiation, fire, or sun, but in the ordinary light of a well-ventilated room or outer air, the chemical mixture in a so-called storm-glass varies in character with the direction of the wind, not its force, specially (though it may so vary in appearance only) from another cause, electrical tension".

The composition of the liquid in a storm glass varies but usually contains "camphor, nitrate of potassium and sal-ammoniac, dissolved by alcohol, with water and some air." These devices are now known to have little value in weather prediction but continue to be a curiosity.

== Description ==
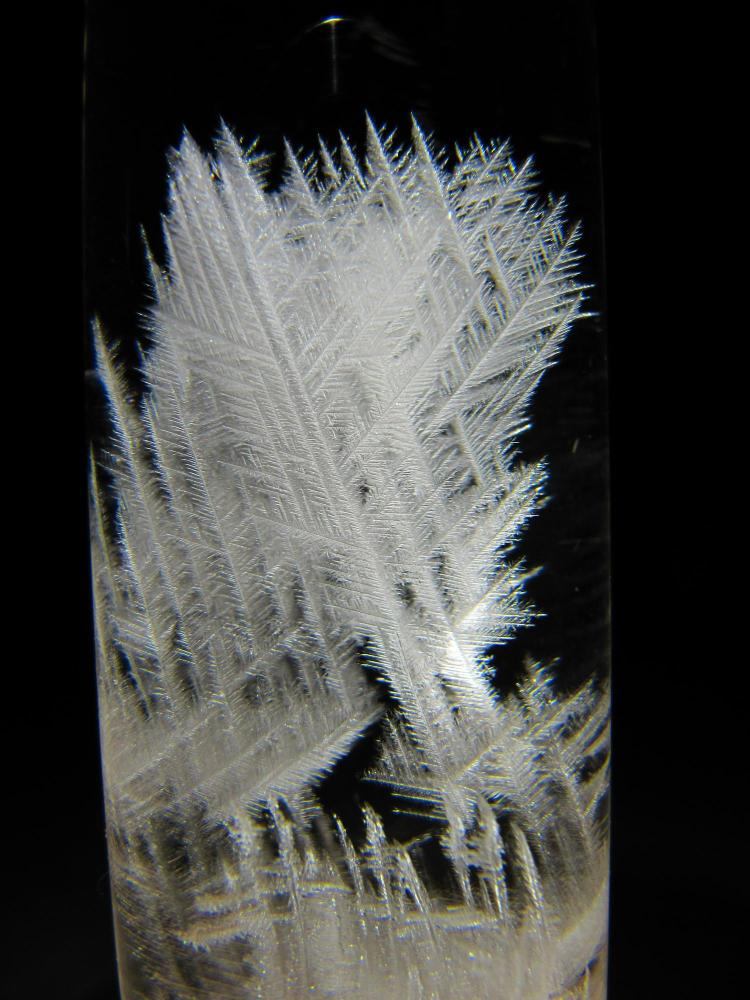
Crystals in FitzRoy Stormglass

The liquid within the glass is a mixture of several ingredients, most commonly distilled water, ethanol, potassium nitrate, ammonium chloride, and camphor. This specific mixture was promoted by Admiral Robert FitzRoy although similar devices existed even two decades earlier with variants in Italy, France and Germany.

FitzRoy carefully documented his claims on how the storm glass would predict the weather:

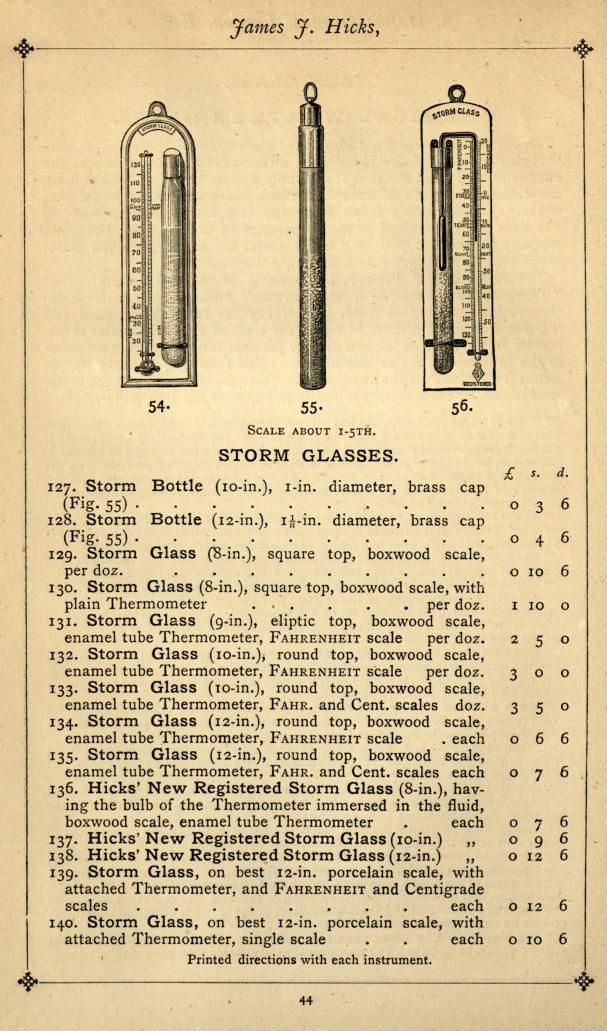
A catalogue of storm glasses c. 1863

- If the liquid in the glass is clear, the weather will be bright and clear.
- If the liquid is cloudy, the weather will be cloudy as well, perhaps with precipitation.
- If there are small dots in the liquid, humid or foggy weather can be expected.
- A cloudy glass with small stars indicates thunderstorms.
- If the liquid contains small stars on sunny winter days, then snow is coming.
- If there are large flakes throughout the liquid, it will be overcast in temperate seasons or snowy in the winter.
- If there are crystals at the bottom, this indicates frost.
- If there are threads near the top, it will be windy.

A version of the device was available in the 18th century in France but the inventor is unknown. In 1859, violent storms struck the British Isles. In response, the British Crown distributed storm glasses, then known as "FitzRoy's storm barometers", to many small fishing communities around the British Isles for consultation by ships in port before setting sail.

== Accuracy ==
In 1863, Charles Tomlinson published an analysis in The Philosophical Magazine concluding that, while attractive, "I think it may fairly be concluded from these experiments and observations that the storm-glass acts as a crude kind of thermoscope, inferior, for most of the purposes of observation, to the thermometer." In 2008 an article in the Journal of Crystal Growth similarly concluded that temperature change is the sole cause of crystal growth in storm glasses.

== See also ==
- Tempest Prognosticator – an alternative to the storm glass that the British government investigated
