= Tomlinson's Cyclopaedia of Useful Arts =

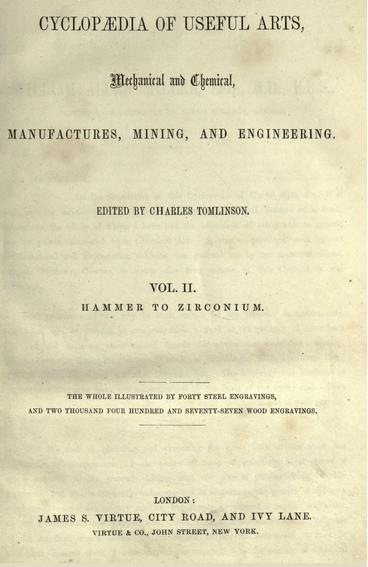
Frontispiece Volume 2 of Tomlinson’s Cyclopaedia of Useful Arts, 1854

Tomlinson's Cyclopaedia of Useful Arts is a multi-volume encyclopedia focusing on manufacturing, mining, and engineering. It was edited by Charles Tomlinson, a Fellow of the Royal Society, and a lecturer at King's College School, London. The original was published between 1852 and 1854 in two volumes (Vol. 1, 832 pages; Vol. 2, 1,052 pages) with 40 steel engravings and 2,477 woodcuts. A supplement was published in 1862 by James S. Virtue, London and New York City.

A new edition was published no earlier than 1866 with the intent of "keeping pace with the varied subjects of the Useful Arts and Manufactures, which are always enlarging their boundaries." Internally the new edition is organized into three volumes of 935, 956, and 740 pages (making it 38% larger than the original edition), but it was sold in various formats, including a nine-volume set. It has 63 full-page steel engravings and 3063 wood engravings (a few of which are a half page), for which the publishing companies of James Sprent Virtue were noted. It was printed by Virtue & Company, of London, and then also of New York.

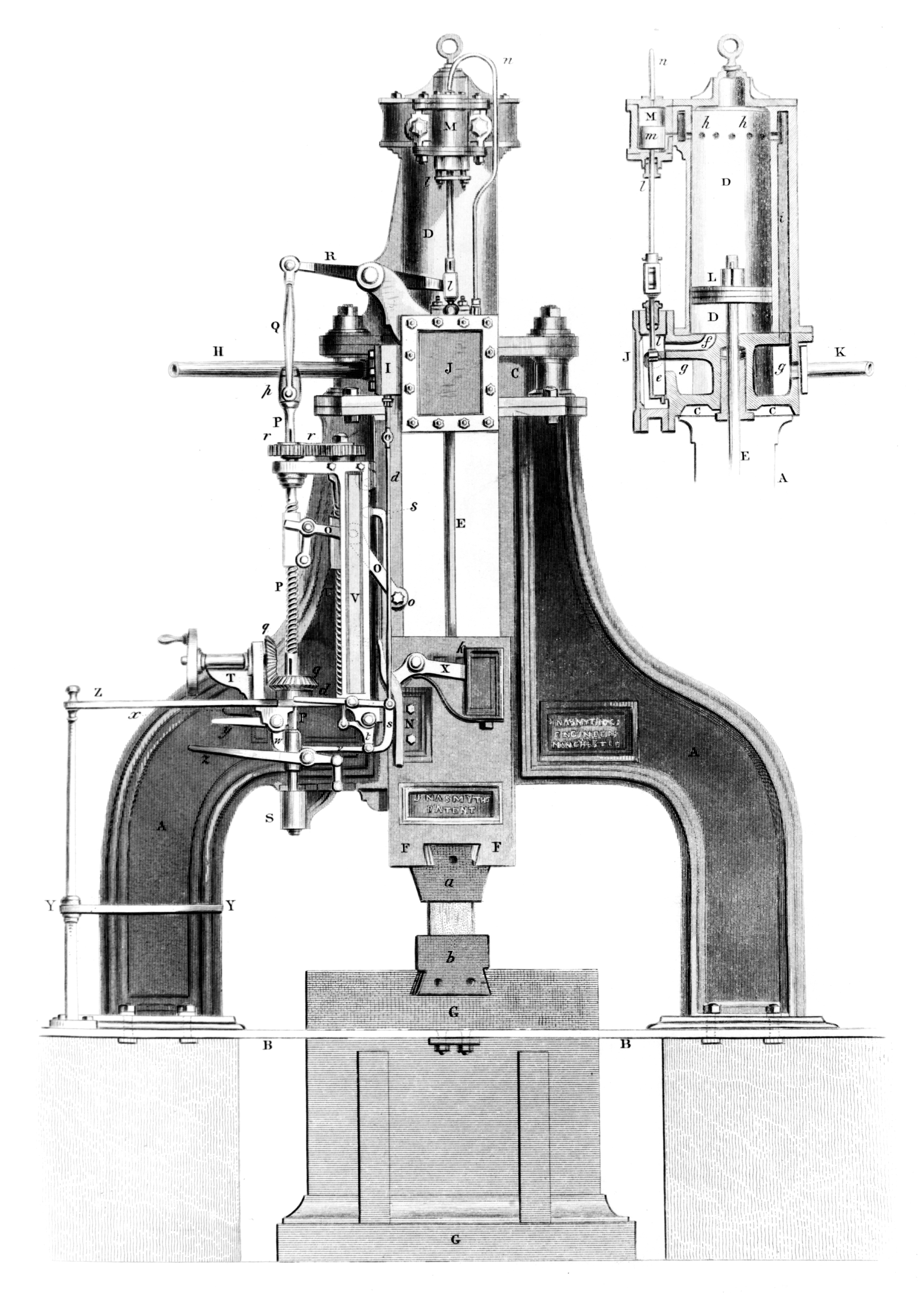
James Nasmyth's patent steam hammer as illustrated in Tomlinson's Cyclopaedia of Useful Arts, 1854

Authors and illustrators are not credited, but Tomlinson appears to have been strongly involved in writing and editing, stating in the introduction that he "did not attempt to make his descriptions appear easy" and that "most of the processes described in the work the Editor himself witnessed."

Tomlinson’s has no articles specifically on people, places, or historical events. Its emphasis can be gauged by comparing articles on "Anemometer."

- Tomlinson’s New Cyclopaedia (1866): About 4,300 words, six figures
- Encyclopædia Britannica, 11th Edition (1911): About 1,800 words, two figures
- Encyclopædia Britannica 15th Edition (1986): About 500 words, one figure

The work is a valuable source of information about the 'how', of handicraft, industry and manufacturing, since it contains numerous illustrated articles describing the techniques. It was devised to celebrate the Great Exhibition, and the monograph-length introduction (160 pp) is a valuable illustrated account of the antecedents of the Exhibition with material on earlier ones, on the construction of the building, the arrangement of the displays and accounts of the highlights of the exhibits.

The articles in Tomlinson cover a range of topics from a British perspective, and the woodcuts portray people in a workshop context. As this was published before the days of photography, this is a useful source for images not otherwise available. Neither the original or the newer edition of Tomlinson’s is restricted by copyright.
