= Lucien Vidi =

French physicist

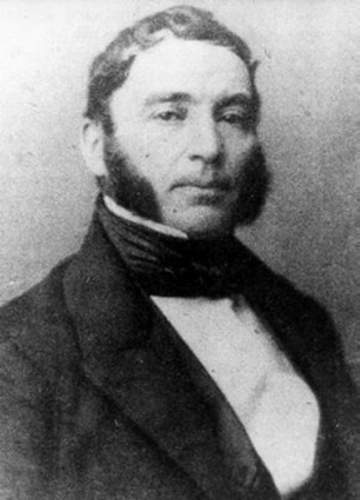
Lucien Vidie

== Invention of the aneroid barometer ==
Lucien Vidie (1805 in Nantes – April 1866 in Nantes) was a French physicist. In 1844, Vidie introduced a new type of barometer that did not rely on mercury, but instead used a sealed, evacuated metallic capsule sensitive to changes in atmospheric pressure. This invention represented a significant departure from traditional mercury barometers, allowing for more compact, portable, and mechanically robust instruments. Despite the commercial success of his invention, Vidie reportedly expended much of his personal fortune on research and development. His death in April 1866 was attributed by contemporaries to excessive use of hydrotherapy, a treatment practice that was popular in 19th-century Europe.

== Legal disputes ==
Vidie’s invention led to several legal disputes concerning priority and intellectual property. Most notably, the French engineer, known for his work on pressure measurement devices, developed a similar instrument in 1849. Bourdon initiated legal proceedings against Vidie in 1852, contesting the originality of the aneroid principle.

The case extended over several years and concluded in 1858 in favor of Vidie, who retained recognition as the inventor of the aneroid barometer. These proceedings played a significant role in establishing legal precedent for patents relating to scientific instruments in mid-19th century France.

== Later life and death ==
Despite the commercial success of his invention, Vidie reportedly expended much of his personal fortune on research and development. His death in April 1866 was attributed by contemporaries to excessive use of hydrotherapy, a treatment practice that was popular in 19th-century Europe.

== Legacy ==
Vidie’s aneroid barometer marked a turning point in the history of atmospheric measurement. Its portability and durability enabled widespread use beyond scientific institutions, including in maritime navigation, aviation (in later adaptations), and domestic meteorology.

The principles established by Vidie remain fundamental to modern mechanical pressure measurement devices.
