= The Saturday Magazine (magazine) =

British magazine

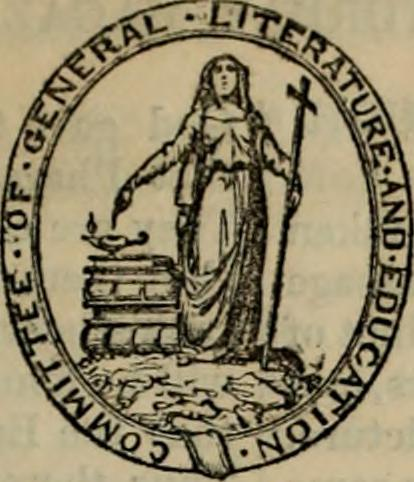
The Saturday Magazine

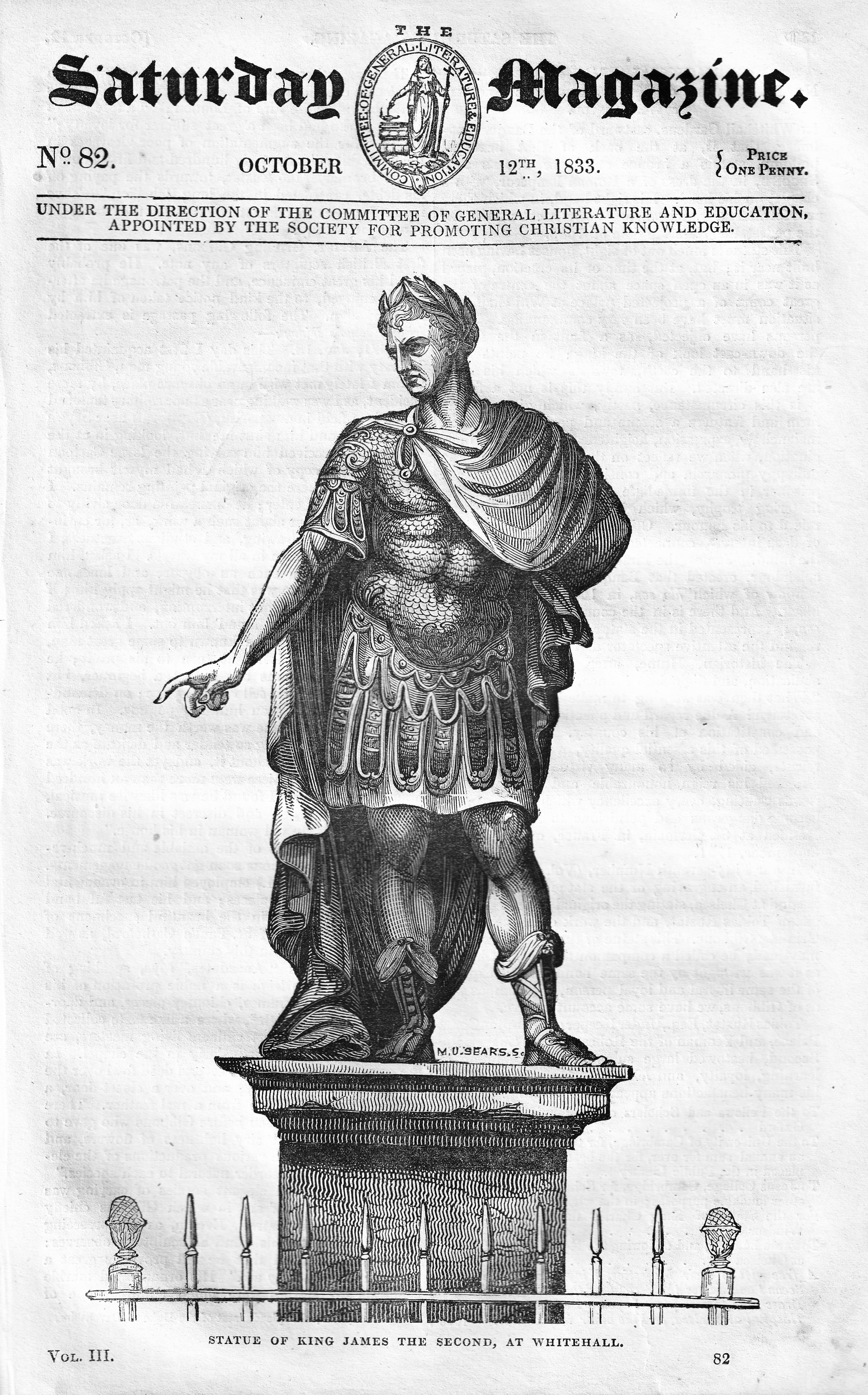
Engraving of the Statue of James II on the front page of The Saturday Magazine number 82, volume III on 12 October 1833

The Saturday Magazine was a British magazine published from 7 July 1832 to 28 December 1844 by the Committee of General Literature and Education, who were in turn sponsored by the Society for Promoting Christian Knowledge. It ran for 801 issues, with the latter issues being published by John William Parker in London. The Saturday Magazine was established as an Anglican rival to the Penny Magazine as a way for the working man to educate himself. The 4-page issues were sold for 1 penny per weekly issue, or sixpence for monthly parts. A typical edition of the Saturday Magazine began with an account of some exotic place. At this time the expansion of the British empire was speeding up and people at home in England were very interested in finding out what was happening around the world. Other articles would be about nature, science, history, technology, etc.
