= Charles Tomlinson (scientist) =

British scientist (1808–1897)

Charles Tomlinson (27 November 1808 – 15 February 1897) was a British scientist who published papers on meteorology and the physical properties of liquids.

== Biography ==
Tomlinson was born in Tottenham, Middlesex. He studied science at evening classes under George Birkbeck, the founder of the London Mechanics' Institute. In 1830 he joined his brother Lewis (who had taken holy orders) at a school in Berkshire, where he taught elementary Latin and French. A few years later, Lewis obtained a curacy near Salisbury, and the brothers founded a school in the city where Charles taught modern languages and experimental science.

Charles added to his knowledge of science by attending lectures at University College, London, and other places. He wrote articles for popular science journals, and some were included in The Student's Manual of Natural Philosophy (1838) which sold well. This encouraged him to settle in London in 1848, and through Parker's publishing house he came into contact with leading scientists with whom he collaborated.

He was appointed lecturer on experimental science at King's College School. During the 1840s and 1850s he published several notable scientific works relating to phenomena of the weather for the Society for Promoting Christian Knowledge, alongside a range of scientific and literary works. He regarded his multi-volume Cyclopedia of Useful Arts (1852–1854) as his major work. In 1864 he was elected to fellowship of the Chemical Society; in 1872 he was elected to the Royal Society, and in 1874 he took a leading part in founding the Physical Society. As a scientist Tomlinson made valuable contributions to the knowledge of the surface tension of liquids.

His last years were devoted to literature, and he held the Dante lectureship at University College 1878–1880. He was also an avid chess player and published a book on this subject, Amusements in Chess, in 1845.

His wife was the author Sarah Windsor Tomlinson who is described as "assisting him in all his works". She died in 1872 and was buried on the eastern side of Highgate Cemetery. Charles Tomlinson died at his London home on 15 February 1897, aged 89, and was buried in the same grave (plot no.19020). Their grave is now under a footpath and has no headstone.

== Publications ==
He authored over 50 books and 100 published papers and notes, among which were:

- Amusements in Chess (London, 1845)
- The Rain-Cloud: An Account of the Nature, Properties, Dangers, and Uses of Rain in Various Parts of the World (London, 1846)
- Winter in the Arctic Regions: I - Winter in the Open Seas, II - Winter in a Secure Harbour, III - Winter in a Snow-Hut (London, 1846)
- The Thunder-Storm: An Account of the Properties of Lightning and of Atmospheric Electricity in Various Parts of the World (London 1848). Includes detailed historic experiences and observations of the effects of thunder and lightning and related effects of electricity in the atmosphere. The third edition of 1877 adds more recent experiences.
- Cyclopaedia of Useful Arts and Manufactures (1852–1854, supplement 1862, expanded edition 1866)
- The Dew-drop and the Mist: An Account of the Phenomena and Properties of Atmospheric Vapour in Various Parts of the World, (London, 1860)
- The Tempest: An Account of the Origin and Phenomena of Wind in Various Parts of the World (London)
- Natural Phenomena (London, 1861)
- The magnet : familiarly described; and illustrated by a box of magnetic toys (1861)
- A Rudimentary Treatise on Warming and Ventilation (1864)
- The Rain-Cloud and The Snow-Storm: an Account of the Nature, Formation, Properties, Dangers, and Uses of Rain and Snow (London, 1865)
- The Sonnet, Its Origin, Structure, and Place in Poetry (1874)
- A translation of Dante Aligheri's Inferno (1877)
- The Literary History of the Divine Comedy (1879)
- a volume of original Sonnets (1881)
- Dante, Beatrice, and the Divine Comedy (1894)

Written with his wife Sarah Tomlinson:

- Lessons From the Animal World (London, 1847)
