= Committee of General Literature and Education =

British publishing organisation

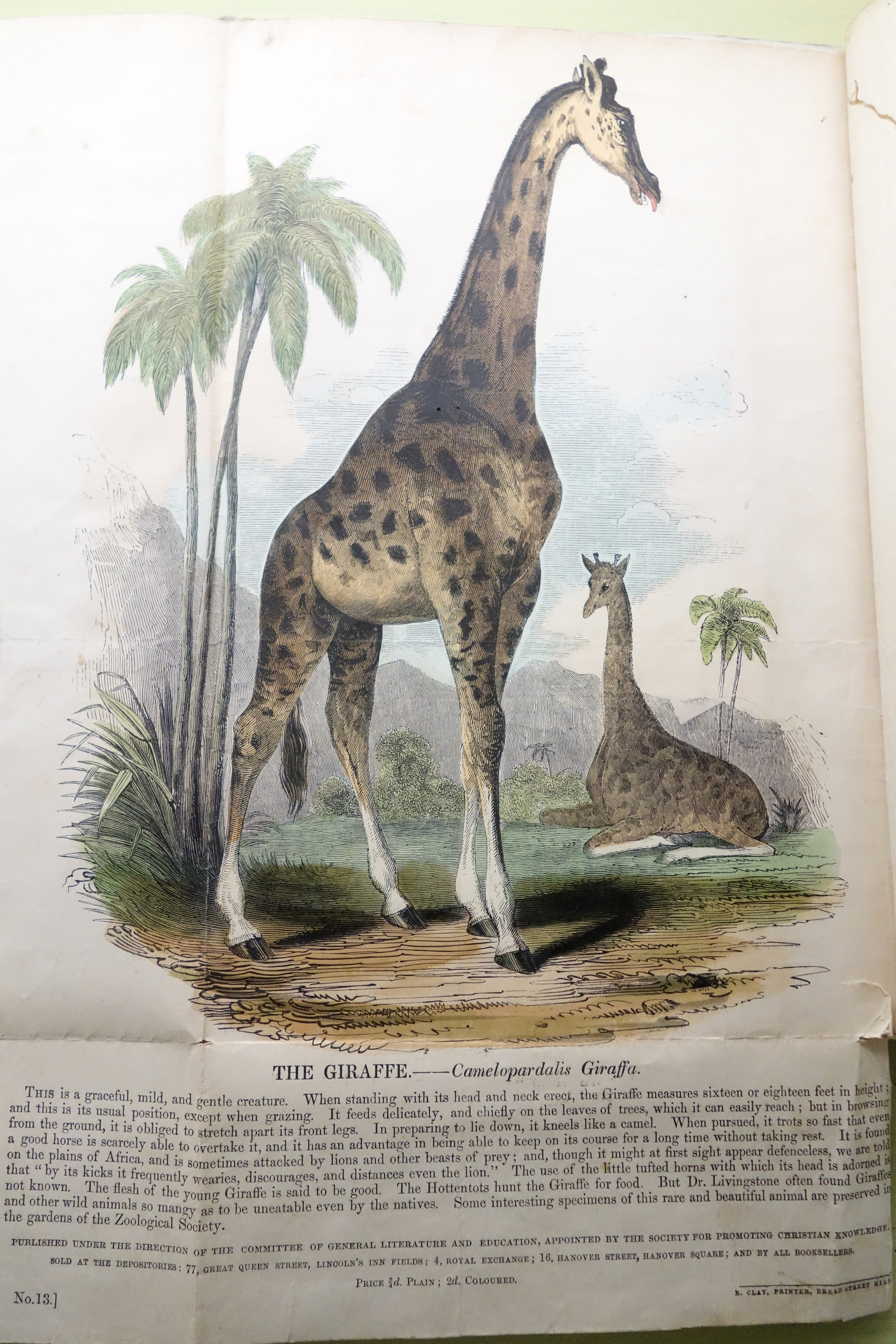
Camelopardalis Giraffa, published under the Direction of the Committee of General Literature and Education

The Committee of General Literature and Education was a British publishing organisation set up by the Society for the Promotion of Christian Knowledge in 1832 to produce school books. It also published The Saturday Magazine.
