= Zak =

Zak may refer to:

== People ==
- Zak (surname), a surname of Russian origin
- Żak, a Polish surname
- Žák, a Czech surname
- Zak (given name)

== Other uses ==
- Zak, Iran, a village in Razavi Khorasan Province
- LWD Żak, a 1940s Polish aircraft
- FK ŽAK Kikinda, a football club in Serbia
- ŽAK Subotica, a football club 1921–1945, Yugoslavia
- ZAK, a human gene
- ISO 639-3 code for the Zanaki language of Tanzania
- Zak or Zaak, a fictional character in the 2019 Indian animated series Chacha Chaudhary

== See also ==
- Zac, a given name
- Zach or Zack (disambiguation)
