= Żaczek =

Żaczek and Zaczek are Polish surnames. "Żaczek" is a diminutive from "żak", an archaic term for "student"

Notable people with the surnames include:

- Artur Zaczek (born 1989), Polish sprinter
- Jarosław Żaczek (born 1967), Polish politician
- Kazimierz Zaczek (1884–1945), Polish politician, statesman and lawyer
- Halina Zaczek, Polish actress and educator
- Zenobia Żaczek (born 1974), Polish activist

== See also ==
- Žáček, an equivalent Czech surname
- Żak, Polish surname
- Zak (surname)
