= Zechariah =

Zechariah most often refers to:

- Zechariah (Hebrew prophet), author of the Book of Zechariah
- Zechariah, father of John the Baptist, New Testament figure

Zechariah or its many variant forms and spellings may also refer to:

== Bible ==
- Book of Zechariah
- Zechariah of Israel, king of Israel for 6 months c. 752 BCE
- Zechariah ben Jehoiada, a priest

== People ==
- Zechariah (given name), a given name (with list of people and fictional characters with the name); includes all the variants (Zacharias, Zecharias, Zechariah, etc.)
- Zacharias (surname) and various related forms (with list of people with the name)
  - Zaharia family, medieval Albanian noble family
- Zachary, a given name (and list of people with the name)
- Zakariya (name), list of people with Arabic variants of this name; includes all the variants (Zakariyya, Zakaria, Zekaria)

== Places ==
- Saint-Zacharie, Quebec, a municipality in Canada
- Zacharia, Kentucky
- Zachariah, Kentucky
- Zacarias, São Paulo, a municipality in Brazil
- Zacharia, Democratic Republic of the Congo, a town
- Zekharia, a moshav in Israel
- Az-Zakariyya, a depopulated Palestinian village in the Hebron sub district
- Khirbat Zakariyya, a depopulated Palestinian village in the Ramle sub district
- Khirbet Beit Zakariyyah, a village in the Bethlehem Governorate, Palestine
- Tell Zakariya, old name of ruin that is now called "Azekah"

== Other uses ==
- Zachariah (film), a 1971 film starring John Rubinstein and Don Johnson
- Zacharias and Co., a former waterproof clothing manufacturing firm and retailer based in Oxford, England
- Z for Zachariah, 1974 American science fiction novel by Robert C. O'Brien
  - Z for Zachariah (Play for Today), 1984 BBC television adaptation
  - Z for Zachariah (film), 2015 film adaptation
- Night of Zechariah, a festive night celebrated by Iraqi in hopes of an unmarried woman to give birth to a son
- Sdot Micha Airbase or Zekharia Airbase, an airbase near Zekharia

== See also ==
- Zachary (disambiguation)
- Zechariah (list of biblical figures)
