= Zechariah (given name) =

- Gender: Male

Origin
- Language: Hebrew
- Origin: זְכַרְיָה
- Meaning: God remembers God has remembered

Other names
- Variant forms: Zacharias, Zacarías, Zaccaria, Sakarias, Zacharie, Zachary, Zackary, Zakariya, Zakhar, Zakariyya, Jakariya, Zahari, Zachariasz, etc.
- Nicknames: Zac, Zach, Zack, Zacky, Zackie, Zak, Riah

Zechariah, with many variant forms and spellings such as Zachariah and Zachary and many diminutive forms including Zach and Zack, is a theophoric masculine given name of Hebrew origin, in which Zəkharyā (זְכַרְיָה) means "God/YHWH remembers" or "has remembered". It comes from the Hebrew roots zakhar (זכר), meaning to remember, and Yah (יָהּ), one of the names of the God of Israel. The Tanakh has two major Zechariahs, a king of Israel and a prophet, and the New Testament includes a third, a priest who fathered John the Baptist and is revered as a prophet in Islam.

Although the Hebrew name is now often transliterated Zechariah in modern editions of the Bible, Zachariah, Zachary, and other forms spelled with the letter A rather than E are much more common in the personal names of many languages owing to the Koine Greek form Zakhariás (Ζαχαρίας), the Latin form Zacharias, and the Arabic form Zakariyyā (زكريا), used in the influential Septuagint and Vulgate editions of the Bible and in the Qur'an. These forms have also been further reinforced by their subsequent use by numerous saints, rulers, and clans and by their use as the religious names of monks and popes.

== People ==
The list includes people with the monastic or papal name Zacharias or Zachariah.

=== Biblical ===
- Zechariah (Hebrew prophet), a prophet of the kingdom of Judah
- Zechariah (New Testament figure), the father of John the Baptist, also mentioned in the Quran as Zakariya
- Minor Bible characters
  - Zechariah (list of biblical figures)#Minor characters lists several minor figures
  - Zechariah ben Jehoiada, son of the High Priest from the times of Ahaziah and Joash, martyred by the latter
  - Zechariah of Israel, king of Israel (reigned for 6 months in c. 752 BCE), son of Jeroboam

=== Orthodox saints, venerables, martyrs ===
- Venerable Martyr Zacharias, by drowning in the sea, Orthodox saint and hosiomartyr commemorated on 21 October
- Zacharias the Martyr, by drowning in the sea, Orthodox martyr, commemorated on October 22 (either same as, or different from, saint commemorated on 21 October)
- Zachariah (d. 724), one of the 63 Martyrs of Jerusalem, Orthodox saint and martyr commemorated on October 21
- Venerable Zachariah the Recluse of Egypt, Orthodox saint commemorated on 24 March
- Venerable Zachariah, Faster of the Kiev Caves (12th century), Orthodox saint commemorated on 24 March
- New Martyr Zachariah of Patrai in Morea (d. 1782)

=== Antiquity through early modern period ===
In chronological order:

- Zacharias of Vienne (died 106), Bishop of Vienne
- Zacharias Rhetor or Scholasticus (c. 465-after 536), bishop of Mytilene and author of the Historia Ecclesiastica
- Zacharias of Jerusalem (fl. 609–632), patriarch of Jerusalem, Orthodox saint
- Pope Zachary (679–752), also known as Zacharias (Gr., Lat.), the last Greek pope (741–752)
- Zacharias I of Makuria (fl. 722), Nubian king
- Zacharias III of Makuria (c. 822-c. 854), Nubian ruler
- Zachariah (Khazar), 9th century khagan of the Khazars known to have ruled c. 861
- Zacharias I of Armenia (died 876), Catholicos of the Armenian Apostolic Church
- Pope Zacharias of Alexandria (1004–1032), Coptic pope
- Zacharias Chrysopolitanus (died c. 1155), Greek scholar
- Zacharias Ferreri (1479–1524), Italian monk and papal legate
- Zacharias Calliergi (fl. 1499–1515), Greek Renaissance humanist and scholar
- Zacharias Ursinus (1534–1583), German theologian
- Zacharias Stopius (born c. 1535), Latvian astronomer
- Zacharias Dolendo (1561–1601), Dutch engraver
- Zacharias Heyns (1566–1630), Dutch printer and engraver
- Zacharias Paulusz (c. 1580–1648), Dutch Golden Age portrait painter
- Zacharias Janssen (1585–c. 1632), Dutch scientist
- Zacharias Traber (1611–1678), Austrian physician
- Zacharias Wagenaer (1614–1668), German governor
- Zacharias Blyhooft (c. 1630–1681), Dutch painter
- Zacharias Longuelune (1669–1748), French architect
- Zacharias Allewelt (1682–1744), Danish-Norwegian sea captain
- Zacharias Conrad von Uffenbach (1683–1734), German book collector
- Zacharias Hildebrandt (1688–1757), German organ builder

=== Single name (modern) ===
- Zacharia, pen name of Paul Zacharia (born 1945), Indian writer of Malayalam literature
- Zachariah or Zachariah Selwyn (born 1975), American singer-songwriter, actor, and writer
- Zacarias, stage name of Brazilian comedian Mauro Faccio Gonçalves, cast member of comedy series Os Trapalhões
- Zacarías (el Perico), performing name of Mexican professional wrestler Mini Máximo (born 1989)
- Zacharias (klepht), (1759–1804), Greek klepht
- Zakarias, pen-name of Finnish writer Adéle Weman (1844–1936)

=== Late modern and contemporary (born after 1750) ===
Arranged by order of the last name.

- Zacharias Adoni (born 1999), Cypriot footballer
- Zacharias Aprem (born 1966), Indian bishop
- Zacharias Athanasios (1909–1977), Syro-Malankara Catholic bishop
- Zacharias Barbitsiotis (1759–1804), Greek revolutionary
- Zaqueri Black (born 1992), a.k.a. Aphromoo, e-Sports support
- Zackery Bowen (died 2006), whose murder of Adriane "Addie" Hall and subsequent suicide are prominently featured in Ethan Brown's 2009 book Shake the Devil Off: A True Story of the Murder that Rocked New Orleans
- Zachariah Branch (born 2004), American football player
- Zacharias Chaliabalias (1946–2020), Greek footballer
- Zacharias Charalambous (born 1971), Cypriot footballer
- Zacarías Colque (born 1967), Bolivian politician
- Zacharias Dase (1824–1861), German mental calculator
- Zacharias "Zack" de la Rocha (born 1970), American singer-songwriter and activist; vocalist of Rage Against the Machine
- Zaachariaha Fielding, Australian musician in the duo Electric Fields
- Zecharias Frankel, (1801–1875), Bohemian-German rabbi and historian
- Zechariah Green (1817–1897), English philanthropist and healer
- Zacharias Hackzell (1751–1804), Swedish chief of police
- Zacharias Heinesen (born 1936), Danish painter
- Zacharias Jimenez (1947–2018), Filipino Roman Catholic bishop
- Zacharias Kavousakis (born 1989), Greek footballer
- Zacharias Kunuk (born 1957), Canadian Inuk producer and director
- Zacharias Lewala (fl. 1908), Namibian miner
- Zacharias Richard Mahabane (1881–1971), South African politician
- Zachariah Keodirelang Matthews (1901–1968), Tswana South African anthropologist
- Zacarias Moussaoui (born 1968), French-Moroccan man convicted of participation in the September 11 attacks
- Zacharias Mellebye (1781–1854), Norwegian politician
- Zacharias Papantoniou (1877–1940), Greek writer and journalist
- Zechariah Puoric Matuong, South Sudanese politician
- Zacharias Schalley (born 1991), German politician
- Zecharia Sitchin (1920–2010), American author promoting the ancient astronaut theory
- Zacarías Supisiche (1843–1897), Argentinian general
- Zachary Taylor (1784–1850), 12th president of the United States (1849–1850)
- Zacharias Theodorou (born 1993), Cypriot footballer
- Zacharias Topelius (1818–1898), Finland-Swedish author
- Zacharias Werner (1768–1823), German poet and priest

== Fictional characters ==
- Zachariah in The True Confessions of Charlotte Doyle
- Brother Zachariah, the name taken on by James Carstairs in the series The Infernal Devices and The Mortal Instruments
- Zachariah (Supernatural), an angel in the American TV series Supernatural
- Zacharias Smith in the Harry Potter series
- Zachory Taylor in The Secret Life of Bees
- Zachariah Trench, central character in Control (video game)
- Zacharias “Zack” Lane in the novel Zack by William Bell

== See also ==
- Zechariah (disambiguation)
- Zacharias (surname)
- Zachary, a male given name
- Zakariya, the Arabic form of the name
- Zack (given name)
- Zak (given name)
- Zach (disambiguation)
- Zack (disambiguation)
- Zahari (name)
