= Žáček =

Žáček (feminine Žáčková) is a Czech surname, a diminutive of Žák ('student'). Notable people include:

- Dušan Žáček, Czech basketball player
- Josef Žáček, Czech painter
- Lucie Žáčková, Czech actress
- Pavel Žáček, Czech doctor of philosophy

== Fictional character ==
- Prince Zacek, main character in the Mexican comic Karmatrón y los Transformables

== See also ==
- Zak (surname), Russian surname
- Żak, Polish surname
