= Zach (given name) =

Zach is the given name or nickname of:

- Zach Aguilar (born 1998), American voice actor
- Zach Allen (born 1997), American football player
- Zach Bako-Bewele (born 1999), American football player
- Zach Banner (born 1993), American football player
- Zach Boren (born 1991), American football player
- Zach Borenstein (born 1990), American baseball player
- Zach Braff (born 1975), American actor
- Zach Bryan (born 1996), American singer
- Zach Callison (born 1997), American voice actor
- Zach Calzada (born 2000), American football player
- Zach Charbonnet (born 2001), American football player
- Zach Cole (born 2000), American baseball player
- Zach Collins (born 1997), American basketball player
- Zach Cunningham (born 1994), American football player
- Zach Curlin (1890–1970), American football and basketball player and coach
- Zach Davidson (born 1998), American football player
- Zach Day (born 1978), American baseball player
- Zach Durfee (born 2001), American football player
- Zach Edey (born 2002), Canadian basketball player
- Zach Ertz (born 1990), American football player
- Zach Evans (born 2001), American football player
- Zach Fruit (born 2000), American baseball player
- Zach Galifianakis (born 1969), American comedian
- Zach Gentry (born 1996), American football player
- Zach Gibson (born 2000), American football player
- Zach Hammer (born 2006), American speed climber
- Zach Hankins (born 1996), American basketball player
- Zach Harrison (born 2001), American football player
- Zach Hill (born 1979), American multi-instrumentalist and visual artist
- Zach Horton (born 2002), American football player
- Zach Hyman (born 1992), Canadian NHL ice hockey player
- Zach Iscol (born 1978), American entrepreneur and US Marine
- Zach Jackson (born 1983), American Major League Baseball player
- Zach Jackson (born 1994), American major league baseball player
- Zach King (born 1990), American internet personality, filmmaker, and illusionist
- Zach Kosnitzky, American participant in Kid Nation
- Zach LaVine (born 1995), American basketball player
- Zach LeDay (born 1994), American-Azerbaijani basketball player
- Zach Line (born 1990), American football player and coach
- Zach Lowe (born 1977), American sportswriter
- Zach Lutmer (born 2004), American football player
- Zach Mathers (born 1994), American soccer player
- Zach Mathis (born 2000), Canadian-American football player
- Zach Maxwell (born 2001), American baseball player
- Zach Maynard (born 1989), American football player
- Zach McAllister (born 1987), American baseball player
- Zach McClellan (born 1978), American baseball player
- Zach McDonald (born 1991), American bicycle racer
- Zach McKinstry (born 1995), American baseball player
- Zach Merrett (born 1995), Australian rules footballer
- Zach P. Messitte (born 1968), American political scientist
- Zach Metsa (born 1998), American ice hockey player
- Zach Miller (runner) (born 1988), American ultramarathon runner
- Zach Miller (snowboarder) (born 1999), American snowboarder
- Zach Miller (tight end, born 1984), American football player
- Zach Miller (tight end, born 1985), American football player
- Zach Mills (born 1995), American former actor
- Zach Miner (born 1982), American baseball player
- Zach Minter (born 1990), American gridiron football player
- Zach Miskovic (born 1985), American ice hockey player
- Zach Mitchell (born 2005), English footballer
- Zach Monroe (1931–2026), American baseball player
- Zach Moore (born 1990), American football player
- Zach Morrison, American football coach
- Zach Moss (born 1981), American basketball player
- Zach Muckenhirn (born 1995), American baseball player
- Zach Murray (born 1997), Australian professional golfer
- Zach Muscat (born 1993), Maltese footballer
- Zach Norton (born 1981), American football player
- Zach Parise (born 1984), American ice hockey player
- Zach Penprase (born 1985), Israeli-American baseball player
- Zach Pfeffer (born 1995), American soccer player
- Zacch Pickens (born 2000), American football player
- Zach Pyron (born 2003), American football player
- Zach Randolph (born 1981), American basketball player
- Zach Sieler (born 1995), American football player
- Zach Thomas (born 1973), American football player
- Zach Thomas (basketball) (born 1996), American basketball player
- Zach Top (born 1997), American singer-songwriter
- Zach Triner (born 1991), American football player
- Zach Tyler Eisen (born 1993), American voice actor
- Zach VanValkenburg (born 1998), American football player
- Zach Villa (born 1987), American actor
- Zach Warren (born 1981), American circus performer and psychologist
- Zach Weiner (born 1982), American webcomic author
- Zach Whitmarsh (born 1977), Canadian track and field athlete
- Zach Williams (musician) (born 1981), American musician
- Zach Wilson (born 1999), American football player
- Zach Wood (born 1993), American football player

== In fiction ==
- Zach Florrick, the eldest of Alicia's children in The Good Wife
- Zach Stevens, in The O.C.

== See also ==
- Zach (disambiguation)
- Zach (surname)
- Zac
- Zachary
- Zack (given name)
- Zak (given name)
- Zechariah (given name)
