= Cysat =

Cysat is a surname. Notable people with the surname include:

- Johann Baptist Cysat (1587–1657), Swiss Jesuit mathematician and astronomer, son of Renward
- Renward Cysat (1545–1614), Swiss apothecary, advocate, cartographer, and city councillor of Lucerne
