= Zack =

Zack or Zach may refer to:

== People ==
- Zach (given name), lists of people and fictional characters named Zach
- Zach (surname), various people
- Zack (given name), lists of people and fictional characters named Zack
- Zack (surname), various people
- Záh (gens) or Zách, a gens (clan) in the Kingdom of Hungary

== Places ==
- Zack, Texas, a formerly populated place
- Zach (crater), on the Moon

== Arts and entertainment ==
- Zack (play), a 1920 play by Harold Brighouse
- Zack, a novel by William Bell

== Others ==
- Tropical Storm Zack (1992), a tropical storm that did not make landfall
- Typhoon Zack (1995), a Category 4 typhoon that hit the Philippines and Vietnam

== See also ==
- ZAC (disambiguation)
- Žač, a village in Kosovo
- Zac, a list of people with the given name
- Zacks, a surname
- Zak (disambiguation)
