= Zachary (disambiguation) =

Zachary is a male given name.

Zachary may also refer to:

== People with the surname ==
- Beulah Zachary (1911 – 1959), American television director and producer
- Hugh Zachary, (1928–2016), American novelist
- Jason Zachary (born 1977), American politician
- Joseph Zachary, American computer scientist and professor
- Lee Zachary (born 1946), American politician
- Robert Zachary (1913–1999), surgeon
- Ted Zachary, American movie studio executive
- Valerie Zachary (born 1962), American attorney

== Other uses ==
- Dear Zachary: A Letter to a Son About His Father, a 2008 American documentary film
- Zachary's Chicago Pizza, pizza restaurant chain in the San Francisco Bay Area
- Zachary, Louisiana, United States, a city

== See also ==
- Zachry, surname
- Zechariah (disambiguation)
- Zach (disambiguation)
- Zack (disambiguation)
- St John Zachary
