= Zackary =

Zackary is a given name. It is alternate spelling of Zachary. Notable people with the name include:

- Zackary Arthur (born 2006), American child actor
- Zackary Bowman (born 1984), American football cornerback
- Zackary Drucker (born 1983), American transgender multimedia artist
- Zackary Leon Furst, Australian chef
- Zackary Medeiros (born 1990), Canadian football kicker and punter
- Zackary Momoh (born 1988), British actor
- Zackary Steffen (born 1995), American soccer player
- Zackary Wright (born 1985), American-born naturalized Bosnian-Herzegovinian basketball player

== See also ==
- Kate Zackary (born 1989), American rugby sevens player
