= Cysatus (crater) =

Lunar impact crater

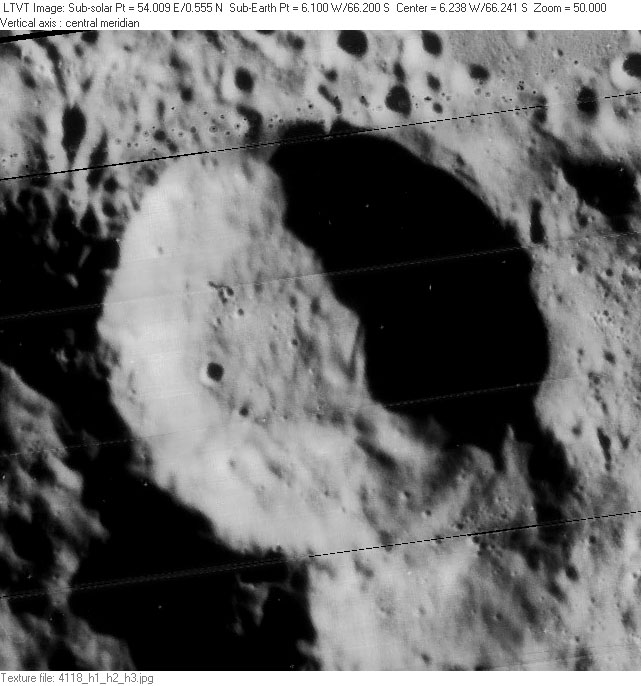
- Lunar Orbiter 4 image
- Coordinates: 66.2°S 6.1°W
- Diameter: 47.77 km (29.68 mi)
- Depth: 4.20 km (2.61 mi)
- Colongitude: 7° at sunrise
- Eponym: Jean-Baptiste Cysat

Cysatus is a lunar impact crater that is located in the southern part of the Moon's near side. It has a diameter at the rim of 48 km and a depth of 4.2 km. This feature is joined to the northeastern rim of the larger crater Gruemberger, and intrudes slightly into the interior of that formation. Due south is the larger Moretus, and to the east is Curtius. These craters appear foreshortened when observed from Earth because of their far south location, making them more difficult to observe.

This circular crater is slightly unusual for its lack of interesting features. No notable craters lie along its rim or the flat, level interior. The inner walls are devoid of terraces and just slope down to the flat floor, although the width of the inner wall is narrower to the northeast than elsewhere. There is a low central rise, but it is difficult to detect.

This formation is named after Swiss mathematician and astronomer Jean-Baptiste Cysat (1588-1657). His name was included as 'Cystatus Soc I.' in the lunar nomenclature of Italian astronomer Giovanni B. Riccioli in 1651. Its modern designation was formally adopted by the International Astronomical Union in 1935.

== Satellite craters ==
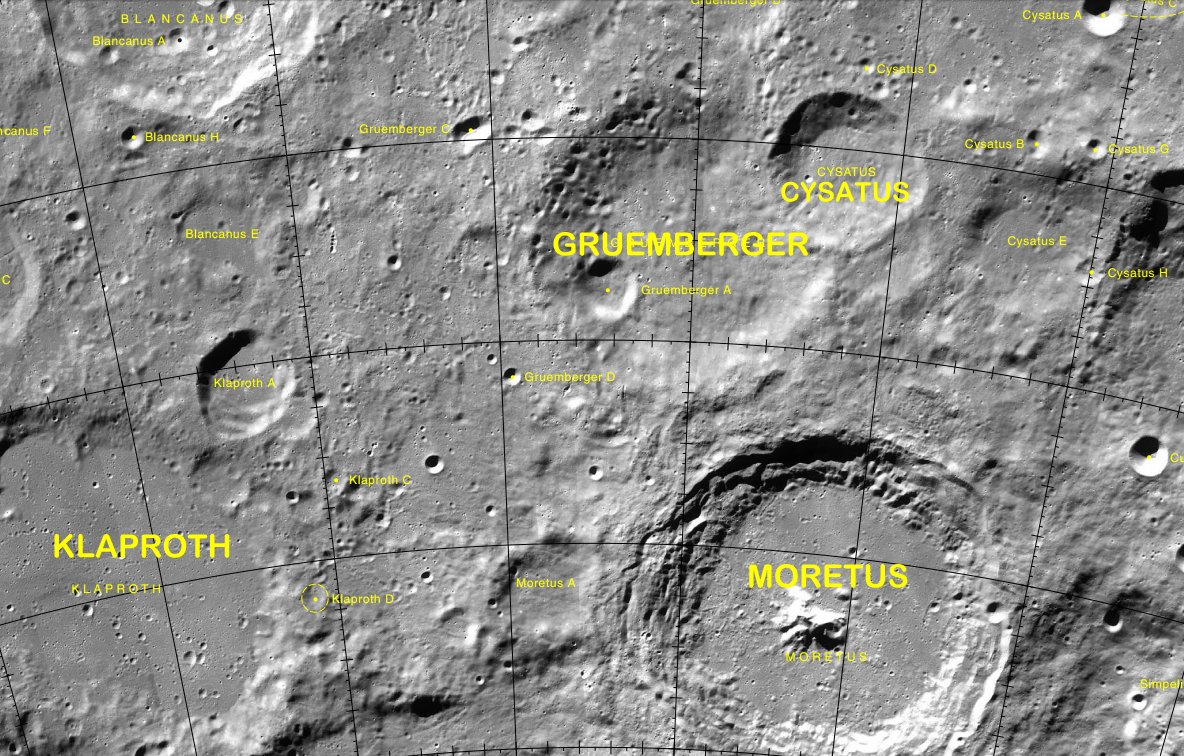
Neighborhood of Cysatus showing satellite features

By convention these features are identified on lunar maps by placing the letter on the side of the crater midpoint that is closest to Cysatus.

Cysatus	Latitude	Longitude	Diameter
A	64.2° S	0.8° W	14 km
B	65.7° S	1.8° W	8 km
C	63.8° S	0.6° E	27 km
D	65.0° S	6.0° W	5 km
E	66.7° S	1.3° W	48 km
F	63.9° S	3.5° W	5 km
G	65.8° S	0.3° W	6 km
H	66.8° S	0.0° E	8 km
J	63.0° S	0.8° E	10 km

The satellite feature A includes a permanently shadowed region where the sunlight never reaches.
