= Zakariya (name) =

Arabic masculine given name

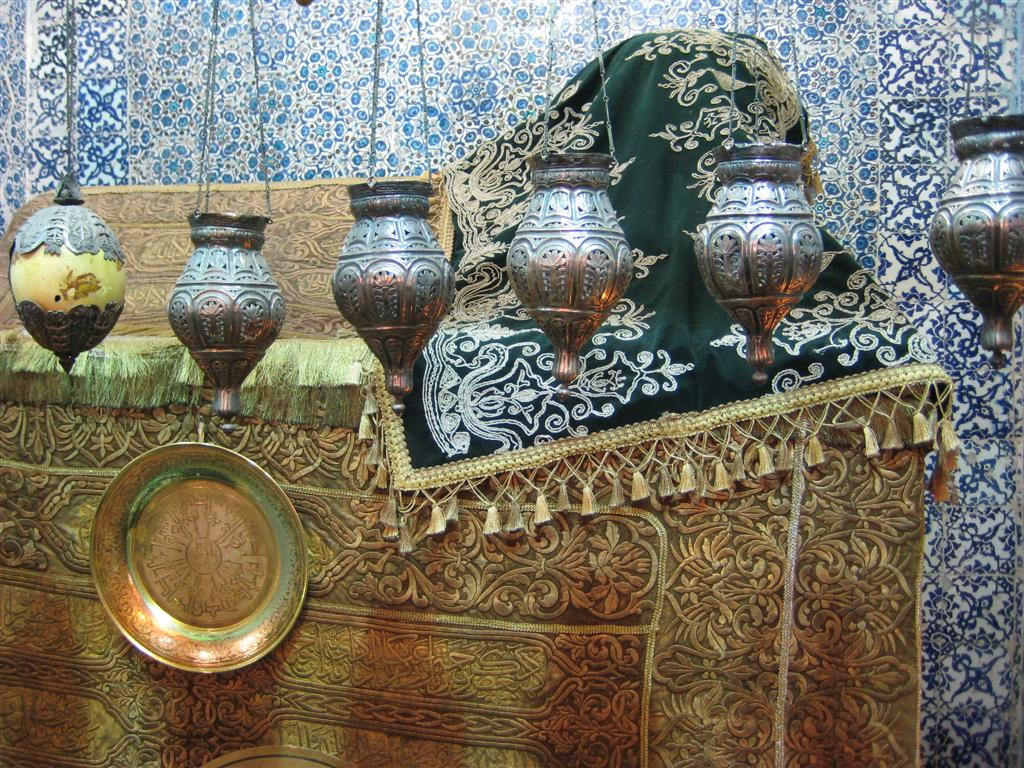
- The tomb of Zakariya father of Yahya within the Great Mosque of Aleppo in Syria
- Pronunciation: Arabic: [zakariːjaː]
- Gender: male
- Language: Arabic

Origin
- Origin: Zechariah (Hebrew זְכַרְיָה)
- Meaning: God/Yahweh has remembered
- Region of origin: Arab world, Muslim world

Other names
- Alternative spelling: Zakaria, Zakariyya, Zachariah, Zekaria, Zakaryah, Zekeriya etc.
- Variant form: Zakarya ((Persian زكريا))
- Related names: Zechariah, Zachary

Zakariya (also transliterated as Zakaria, Zakariyya, Zachariah, Zekariya, Zakaryyaa etc., Arabic: زَكَرِيَّاء or زَكَرِيَّا) is a masculine given name, the Arabic form of Zechariah which is of Hebrew origin, meaning "God/Yahweh has remembered".

== Ancient times ==
- Zakariya, the father of Yahya (John the Baptist) in Islam

== Medieval era ==
- Zakariyya al-Ansari (1420–1520), Egyptian historian and Islamic scholar
- Zakariya al-Qazwini (1203–1283), Persian physician
- Abu Bakr Muhammad ibn Zakariya al-Razi (865–925), also known as "Razi" and "Rhazes", Persian physician, philosopher and scholar
- Baha-ud-din Zakariya (1170–1262), Sufi saint
- Abu Zakariya (1203–1249), founder and first ruler of the Hafsid dynasty in Ifriqiya
- Zakariya Khan Bahadur, Mughal governor of Lahore

== Modern times ==
=== Given name ===
- Zakaria Abdulla (born 1956?), Kurdish singer
- Zakaria al-Agha (1942–2025), Palestinian politician
- Zakariyya Ahmad (1896–1961), Egyptian musician and composer
- Zakaria Alaoui (born 1966), Moroccan football goalkeeper
- Zakaria Amara (born 1985), Canadian-Jordanian accused of plotting terrorist attacks against targets in southern Ontario
- Zakaria Ariffin (1952–2025), Malaysian playwright, theater director and educator
- Zakaria Azmi (born 1938), Egyptian politician
- Zakaria Botros (born 1934), Coptic priest from Egypt
- Zakaria Charara (born 1986), Lebanese footballer
- Zekeria Ebrahimi (born 1996), Afghan actor known for The Kite Runner
- Zakariya Essabar (1977–??), Moroccan al-Qaeda member
- Zakaria Goneim (1905–1959), Egyptian archaeologist
- Zakaria Khan (1915–1975), birth name of Indian actor Jayant
- Zakariyya Kandhlavi (1898–1982), Indian Islamic scholar
- Zakaria Labyad (born 1993), Moroccan footballer
- Zakaria Mohieddin (1918–2012), Egyptian military officer, former Prime Minister of Egypt
- Zakariyyā Mūsawiy (born 1968), French citizen convicted of conspiracy to kill
- Zakaria Al Omari (born 1990), Syrian footballer
- Zakaria Pintoo (1943–2024), Bangladeshi footballer
- Zakaria Sherif Zaki (born 1990), Egyptian-American actor
- Zakaria Tamer (born 1931), Syrian author
- Zakaria Zubeidi (born 1976), Palestinian militant leader
- Zakaria Zuffri (born 1975), Indian cricketer

=== Surname ===
- Arif Zakaria (born 1966), Indian actor
- Asif Zakaria, Indian politician
- Damane Zakaria (died 2022), Central African warlord
- Denis Zakaria (born 1996), Swiss footballer of Congolese descent
- Fareed Zakaria (born 1964), Indian-American journalist and author
- Ibrahim Zakaria (disambiguation), multiple people
- Katie Zacharia, American political commentator
- Maryam Zakaria, Iranian actress in Indian cinema
- Mohammed Zakariya (born 1942), American calligrapher
- Moufdi Zakaria (1908–1977), Algerian poet and writer4
- Nauman Zakariya, Pakistani military officer
- Zuzu Zakaria, Norwegian-Azerbaijani singer and electronic music producer

== See also ==
- Zechariah (given name)
- Zacharias (surname)
- Zechariah (disambiguation)
