= Saint Olive Family =

The Saint Olive family (Zacharie lineage) is a Lyon family whose history begins in the 17th century and which is made up of several members who influenced Lyon and its surrounding region: the apothecary perfumer Pierre Boiteux de Saint Olive, the designer Paul (Lambert) Saint Olive, the sculptor Michel Saint Olive and the bankers Saint Olive.

coat of arms of the Saint Olive family on stained glass

== Apothecaries perfumers Saint Olive (1650–1793) ==
Hugues Saint Olive is the son of Zacharie Boiteux de Saint Olive. Hugues Boiteux de Saint Olive was born in 1650 in Saint Chef en Bourgoin (Isère). He was behind the creation of the Saint Olive perfumery apothecary establishments, founded in 1675. The profession of apothecary in the 17th century consists of trading in ingredients that make up medicines and perfumery. The Saint Olive specializes in the sale of wax and flower essences for perfumers in the Chalon sur Saône and Lyon regions. Pierre Saint Olive, Hugh's son, studied in laboratories in Paris Jardin royal des plantes medicinales, Montpellier university of Medecine, and jardin des plantes de Montpellier before returning to his native lands and carrying on the family tradition. To this end, in 1708 he bought the Berthault apothecary shop in Chalon sur Saône and then other establishments in the region. In 1708, the Saint Olive family has taken twenty percent of the market shares in the Chalon sur Saône and Lyon regions. Saint Olive's development may have aroused the jealousy of some competitors in 1709 which tried to hamper Saint Olive's activity by various intimidations. To defend himself, Pierre Boiteux de Saint Olive initiated a lawsuit in 1711 against the apothecaries of Chalon, the Lesné and Berthault families. The trial lasts three years and for a time prevents Pierre Boiteux de Saint Olive from exercising his profession as an apothecary perfumer. In 1714, the legal battle was won by the Saint Olive family who could establish their perfume activity until the end of the 18th century. The Saint Olive notably supplied the perfumer Jean-Louis Fargeon. During the revolution of 1793 (called Terreur), the Saint Olive gave up their activities as perfumers and went into exile in Switzerland.

François de Saint Olive, last Saint Olive apothecary before the French Revolution

== Paul ( Lambert ) Saint Olive (1799–1879) ==
Paul (Lambert) Saint Olive is an artist, designer and engraver, he followed and studied the streets and monuments of Lyon, leaving numerous drawings, notes and historical studies

== Saint Olive bankers (1809 to now) ==
Banque Saint Olive (BSO) is a French banking establishment founded in Lyon in 1809 and specializing in wealth management.

== Michel Saint Olive (1917–1993) ==
Michel Saint Olive is an artist sculptor who lived from 1917 to 1993.
