= Zack (surname) =

Zack is a surname. Notable people with the surname include:

- Alma Zack (born 1970), Israeli actress
- Arnold M. Zack (born 1931), American arbitrator and mediator of labor management disputes
- Darren Zack (born 1960), Canadian Ojibwa softball player
- Eddie Zack (1922–2002), American country music singer, guitarist and songwriter
- Léon Zack (1892–1980), Russian-born French painter and sculptor
- Joseph Zack (1898–1963), Austrian-born American communist and anti-communist
- Maya Zack (born 1976), Israeli artist and filmmaker
- Naomi Zack, professor of philosophy at the University of Oregon
- Raymond Zack (c. 1958–2011), a man who died while police and firefighters did nothing to save him
- Sally Zack (born 1962), American road cyclist
- Stephen Zack (born 1992), American basketball player

== See also ==
- Zac Efron
- Zach (surname)
