= Lilius (crater) =

Lunar surface depression

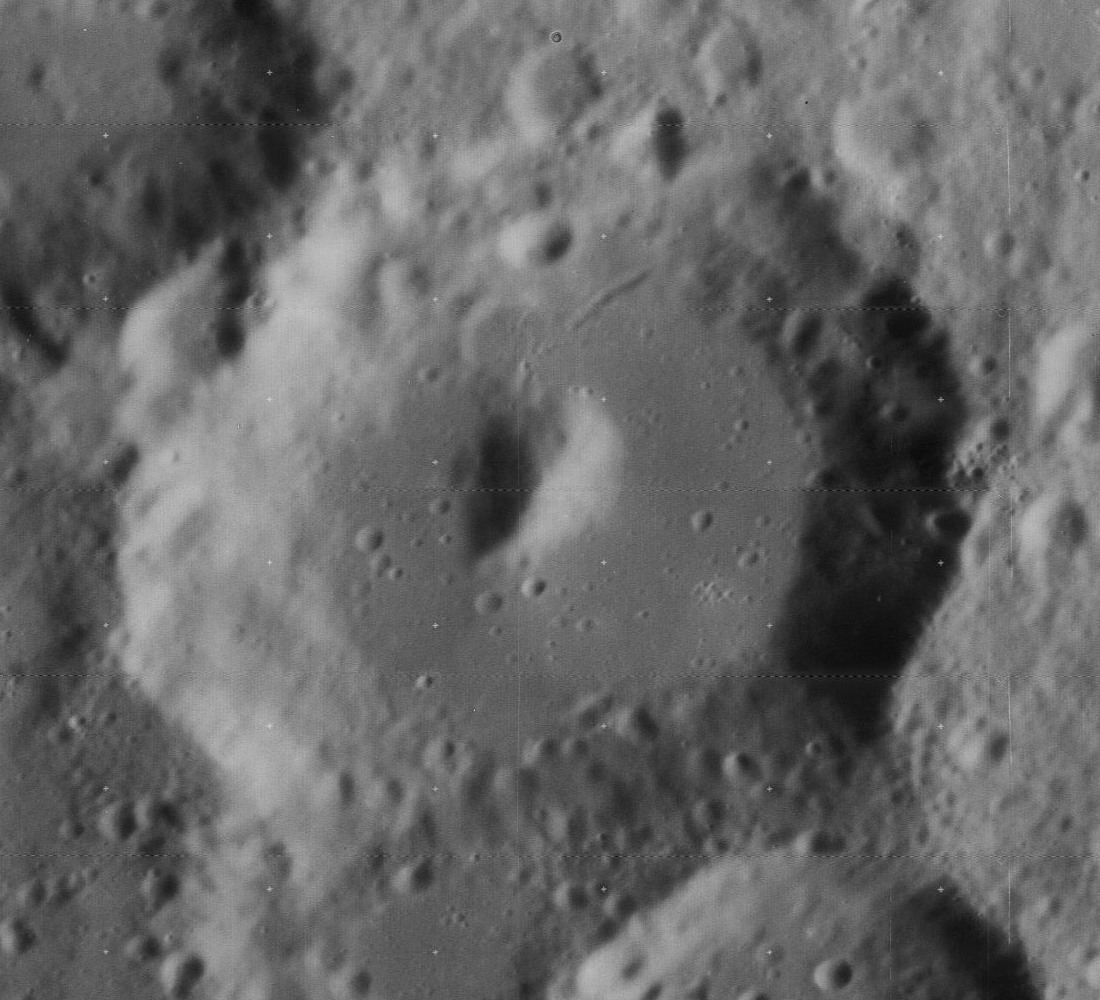
- Lunar Orbiter 4 image
- Coordinates: 54.5°S 6.2°E
- Diameter: 61 km
- Depth: 3.0 km
- Colongitude: 354° at sunrise
- Eponym: Aloysius Lilius

Lilius is a lunar impact crater that is located in the rugged southern highlands of the Moon. It lies to the north of the crater Zach, and south-southwest of Cuvier. Just to the southeast is the slightly larger Jacobi. The crater is named after the inventor of the Gregorian calendar, Aloysius Lilius.

The outer rim of Lilius has been worn down and rounded, particularly to the northwest where the inner wall protrudes farther into the interior floor. The lowest portion of the rim is to the south, adjacent to a crater attached to the southeast part of the outer wall. The interior floor is relatively flat and featureless, but there is a wide, domed central peak at the midpoint.

== Satellite craters ==
By convention these features are identified on lunar maps by placing the letter on the side of the crater midpoint that is closest to Lilius.

| Lilius | Latitude | Longitude | Diameter |
|---|---|---|---|
| A | 55.4° S | 8.8° E | 41 km |
| B | 53.0° S | 3.8° E | 29 km |
| C | 54.4° S | 3.3° E | 40 km |
| D | 50.6° S | 3.0° E | 51 km |
| E | 50.1° S | 2.9° E | 38 km |
| F | 49.4° S | 1.7° E | 43 km |
| G | 50.0° S | 0.7° E | 7 km |
| H | 50.5° S | 0.8° E | 9 km |
| J | 56.3° S | 1.8° E | 13 km |
| K | 53.6° S | 2.2° E | 23 km |
| L | 54.9° S | 2.5° E | 6 km |
| M | 56.2° S | 2.9° E | 11 km |
| N | 49.0° S | 2.8° E | 5 km |
| O | 55.4° S | 3.6° E | 7 km |
| P | 55.9° S | 3.9° E | 4 km |
| R | 54.6° S | 4.4° E | 9 km |
| S | 52.8° S | 5.9° E | 14 km |
| T | 55.9° S | 7.5° E | 5 km |
| U | 53.5° S | 7.6° E | 8 km |
| W | 53.6° S | 8.3° E | 9 km |
| X | 53.5° S | 9.9° E | 4 km |
