= Theodorus Moretus =

Flemish Jesuit priest, mathematician and geometer

Theodorus Moretus, also known as Theodor or Theodore Moretus (1602–1667) was a Flemish Jesuit priest who was also a mathematician, geometer, theologian and philosopher. He spent most of his working life in Prague and Breslau (now Wroclaw) where he taught philosophy, theology and mathematics. He published a number of treatises on these three subjects and also on physics and music theory.

== Life ==
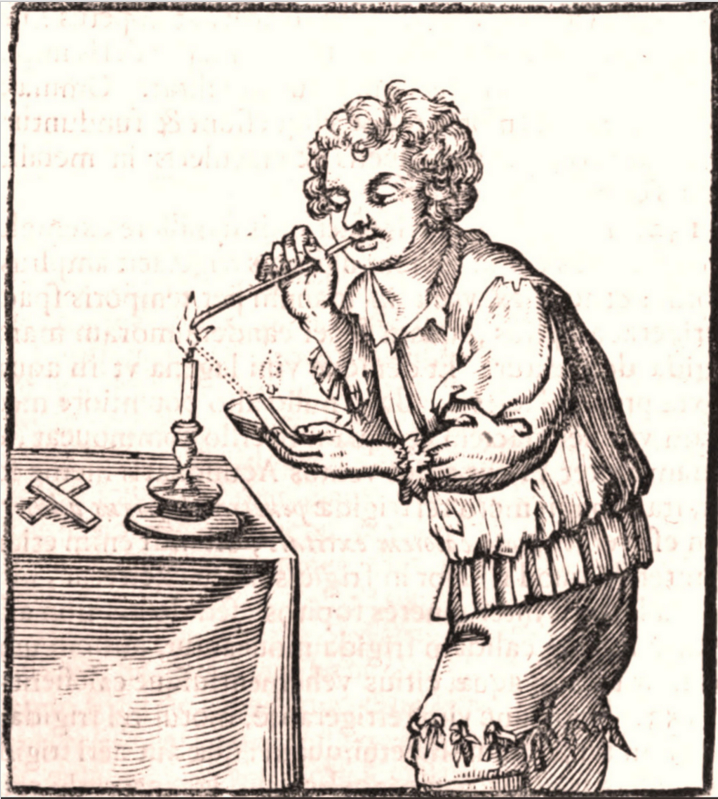
Illustration of an experiment showing the melting of metals with a glass, from Tractatus physico-mathematicus de aestu mari

Theodorus Moretus was born in Antwerp, the son of Pieter Moretus and Henrica Plantin. Both his parents were from prominent printing families: his mother was a daughter of Christophe Plantin, the founder of the famous Plantin Press in Antwerp while his father was the brother of Jan Moretus who was initially an assistant of Plantin, married another Plantin daughter and, after taking over the Plantin Press from his father-in-law, steered the business to further success well into the 17th century. Theodorus Moretus' father was a diamond trader and cutter.

Moretus studied mathematics at the Jesuit school in Antwerp founded by François d'Aguilon. He was a student at this school for seven years. He joined the Jesuit order in Mechelen as a novice on 15 November 1618. He then studied at the University of Leuven. He took physics in 1622–1623 and studied theology from 1623 to 1627. In 1627–28 Moretus is mentioned as a teacher of syntax in Bruges. His title was Magister, which indicates he had not been formally ordained yet. His aptitude for science (particularly mathematics) was appreciated early on by Father Gregorius van St-Vincent, who had arranged for Moretus to be able to continue his studies in Louvain without first having to spend a few years in colleges. Gregorius van Vincent also arranged for Moretus to send dissertations on mathematical subjects to Christoph Grienberger, the chair of mathematics at the Collegio Romano in Rome who reviewed them. Moretus was possibly ordained as a priest in 1628–29.

In 1629–30 Moretus was teaching in Münster. The next year he moved to Prague to join Gregorius van Vincent who had been sent there to teach mathematics. Moretus was to assist the ailing Gregorius in his teaching duties. The following year, the invasion of the Swedes and the sacking of Prague during the Thirty Years' War forced both to leave Prague. While van Vincent first went to Vienna to recover, Moretus was sent to Olomouc (now in the Czech Republic), where he taught philosophy and other subjects until 1634. By that time Moretus had acquired the title of Master in Liberal Arts and Philosophy, but it is not clear when or where he obtained the title. He returned to Prague at the end of 1634. Moretus was the author of the first mathematical dissertation ever defended in the College of St. Clement (the 'Clementinum') in Prague. The dissertation was entitled Propositiones mathematicae de celeri et tardo, naturae et armorum and was defended by Moretus in 1633 or 1635. The present whereabouts of the manuscript of the dissertation is not known. From 1642 to 1645, Theodorus left his teaching post as he was sent as a preacher and missionary to the home that the Jesuits owned in Brzezenica, a small town in Galicia. In 1646 he was sent back to Prague as a professor, initially, of Holy Scripture and no longer of mathematics. He also was appointed to the office of councilor of the provincial council of Bohemia.

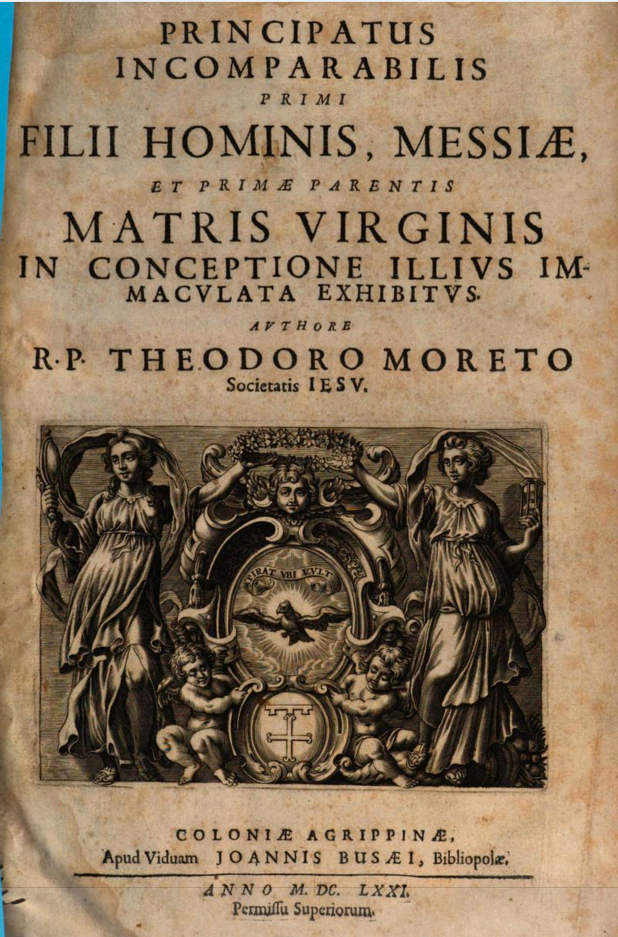
Frontispiece of Principatus filii Hominis Jesu

Moretus left Prague in 1653, and on 19 August of the same year, he took over the rectorate of the college of Klatovy. It was a difficult task as the little college had fallen into ruin and the new rector had to rebuild it with funds he had to find himself. He managed the college for three years. He spent the year 1657 at Neisse (now Nysa, in Poland), occupied in various apostolic ministries. From there he went to Głogów in 1658. The same year he embarked on a long journey through Bohemia, Moravia and Austria. In 1660 Moretus was for the first time attached to the College of Breslau, where he joined the apostolic ministry for the teaching of mathematics. He remained in this college for two years. He spent the year 1662 at Kłodzko but soon returned to Breslau, probably as early as 1663. It was during his stay at Kłodzko that he published his Principatus incomparabilis primi filii hominis messiae et primae parentis Matris Virginis : in conceptione illius immaculata exhibitus in Cologne. The Principatus is a work of both theology and piety and was intended to defend the thesis of the Immaculate Conception.

Moretus submitted in 1664 a paper entitled Propositiones mathematicas ex harmonica de Soni Magnitude, which was later published. This treatise provided a mathematical analysis of the harmony of sounds. The work shows Moretus to be a follower of Pythagoras who was much attached to the old music. It is from Breslau that Moretus sent the Tractatus physico-mathematicus de aestu mari (Physio-mathematical Treatise of the Tides), one of his best-known works, to Antwerp for publication. In this work he explains the tides as a result of the magnetism of the moon.

Moretus died in Breslau (Wroclaw).

The lunar crater Moretus was named after him.

== Work ==
The scientific work undertaken by Moretus was very successful: he made various discoveries in physics and astronomy, hydraulics and music theory but mainly mathematics. His research in optics brought him even fame among such scientists as was Robert Hooke, Athanasius Kircher, Cornelis Drebbel and Jan Marek Marci.

Moretus' scientific diaries containing technical notes and drafts as well as his correspondence with eminent European scholars of that time such as Athanasius Kircher, Balthasar Conrad, Giovanni Battista Riccioli are preserved in the National Library of the Czech Republic. His extensive correspondence with his family members Balthasar Moretus I and Balthasar Moretus II who had taken over management of the Plantin Press is partially preserved in the Plantin-Moretus Museum in Antwerp.

== Selected works ==
=== Relating to mathematics ===
- Mathematici Tractatus, Prague, 1641
- Propositiones mathematicae ex Optica de Imagine Visionis, Bratislava, 1661
- Propositiones mathematicas ex harmonica de Soni Magnitude, 1664

=== Relating to geometrics ===
- De luna pascali et solis motu, Wroclaw, 1666

=== Relating to physics ===
- De ponderum gravitate, Prague, 1663
- Tractatus physico-mathematicus de aestu mari, Antwerp, Jac. Meursius, 1665

=== Relating to theology ===
- Soliloquia ad obtestationes Davidicas et Psalmorum allegoria, Antwerp, Plantin Press, 1656
- De principatu B. Virginis, Antwerp, Plantin Press, 1670
- Principatus incomparabilis primi filii hominis messiae et primae parentis Matris Virginis : in conceptione illius immaculata exhibitus, Cologne, Apud viduam J. Busaei, 1671
