= Jacobi (crater) =

Lunar surface depression

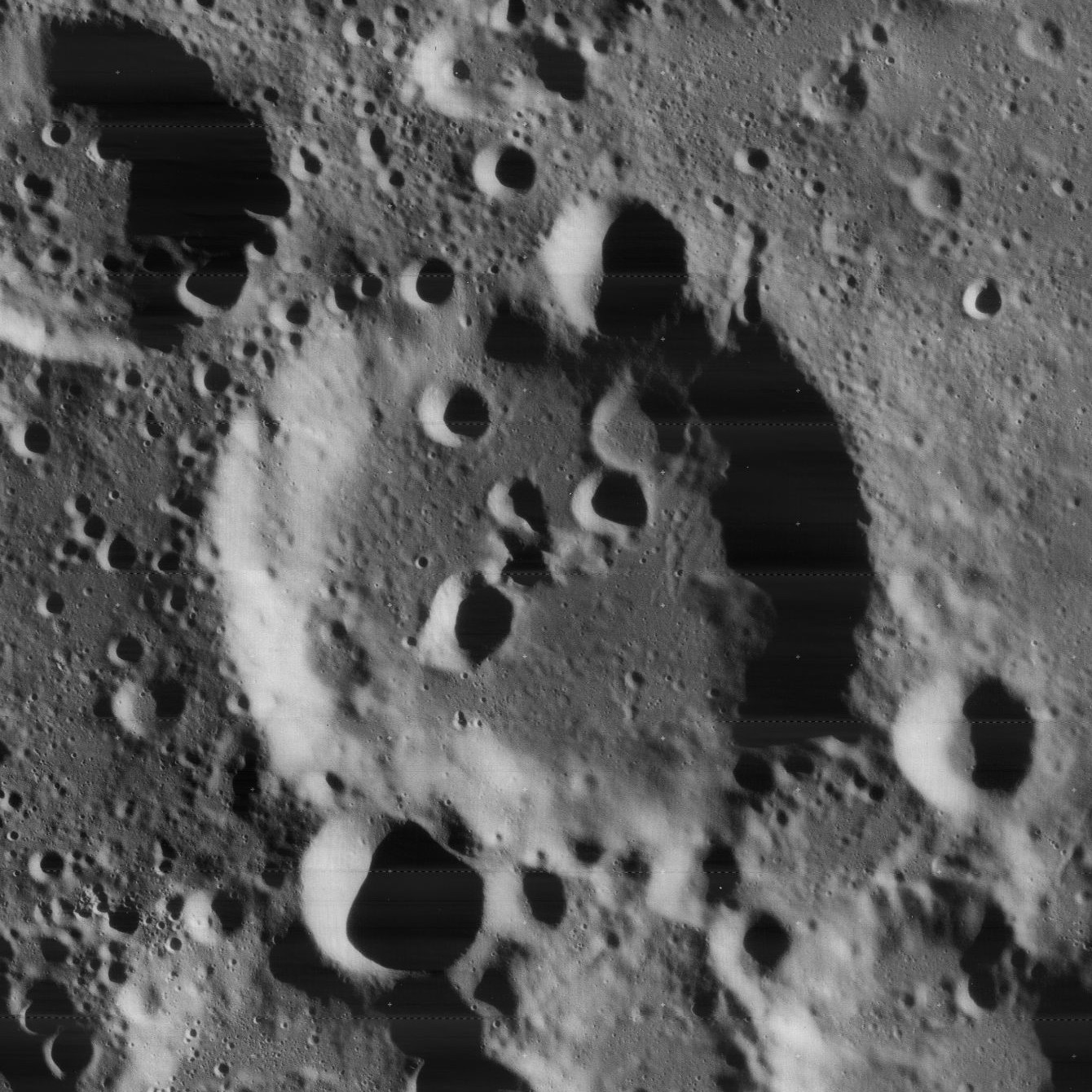
- Lunar Orbiter 4 image
- Coordinates: 56.7°S 11.4°E
- Diameter: 68 km
- Depth: 3.3 km
- Colongitude: 349° at sunrise
- Eponym: Karl G. J. Jacobi

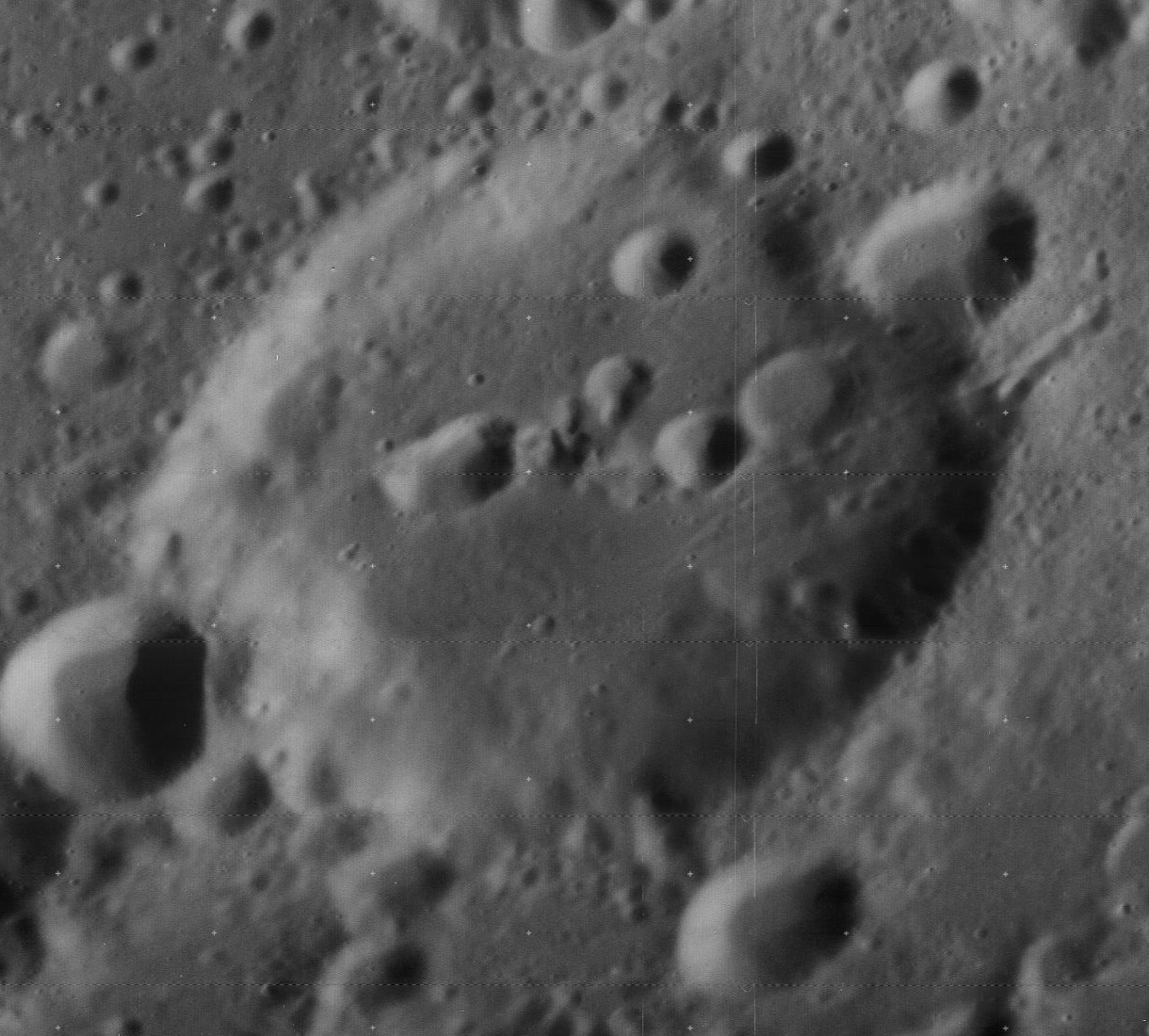
Slightly oblique Lunar Orbiter 4 image

Jacobi is a lunar impact crater that is located in the southern highlands on the near side of the Moon. It lies southeast of the crater Lilius, with Cuvier to the north-northwest and Baco to the northeast. The crater is 68 kilometers in diameter and 3.3 kilometers in depth. It is from the Pre-Nectarian period, 4.55 to 3.92 billion years ago.

This crater has a worn rim that is overlain by several craters along the southern face, including Jacobi J, and a pair on the northern rim. The result is an outer rim that appears flattened along the northern and southern faces. The larger of the craters on the north rim, Jacobi O, forms a member of a chain of craters that form a rough line across the interior floor from northeast to southwest. The central part of this chain in particular forms a merger of several tiny craters at the midpoint of the floor. The remainder of the floor is level, perhaps as a result of erosion or deposited material.

The overlapping crater triplets of Jacobi F, Jacobi E, and Jacobi G form a line to the south of Jacobi crater. The crater was named after the 19th-century Prussian-Jewish mathematician Carl Gustav Jacob Jacobi by the International Astronomical Union in 1935.

== Satellite craters ==
By convention these features are identified on lunar maps by placing the letter on the side of the crater midpoint that is closest to Jacobi.

Jacobi	Latitude	Longitude	Diameter
A	58.5° S	16.0° E	28 km
B	54.4° S	13.9° E	14 km
C	59.8° S	10.6° E	35 km
D	60.8° S	10.6° E	21 km
E	58.5° S	11.8° E	24 km
F	58.5° S	9.6° E	42 km
G	58.4° S	13.9° E	42 km
H	58.5° S	10.6° E	9 km
J	58.0° S	10.3° E	19 km
K	56.7° S	10.8° E	9 km
L	55.4° S	15.4° E	9 km
M	57.8° S	12.1° E	10 km
N	56.3° S	11.8° E	8 km
O	55.7° S	11.9° E	17 km
P	57.3° S	13.8° E	15 km
Q	55.8° S	14.0° E	4 km
R	55.3° S	13.8° E	5 km
S	57.5° S	14.9° E	5 km
T	56.0° S	15.2° E	6 km
U	55.0° S	13.2° E	7 km
W	56.0° S	10.8° E	7 km
Z	59.1° S	11.9° E	5 km
