= Zekeriya =

Zekeriya is the Turkish version of the Arabic masculine given name Zakariya and is mostly used in Turkey. It is a reference to one of the prophets mentioned in the Quran.

Notable people with the name are as follows:

- Zekeriya Aknazarov (1924–2000), Soviet-Bashkir statesman and politician
- Zekeriya Alp (born 1948), Turkish retired football player and businessman
- Zekeriya Güçlü (1972–2010), Turkish wrestler
- Zekeriya Sertel (1890–1980), Turkish journalist
- Zekeriya Yapıcıoğlu (born 1966), Turkish-Kurdish politician and lawyer
