= Zacha =

Zacha is a surname. Notable people with the surname include:

- Bill Zacha (1920–1998), American artist and entrepreneur
- Pavel Zacha (born 1997), Czech ice hockey player

== See also ==
- Tacha
- Zach (surname)
- Zache
