= Pentland (crater) =

Lunar surface depression

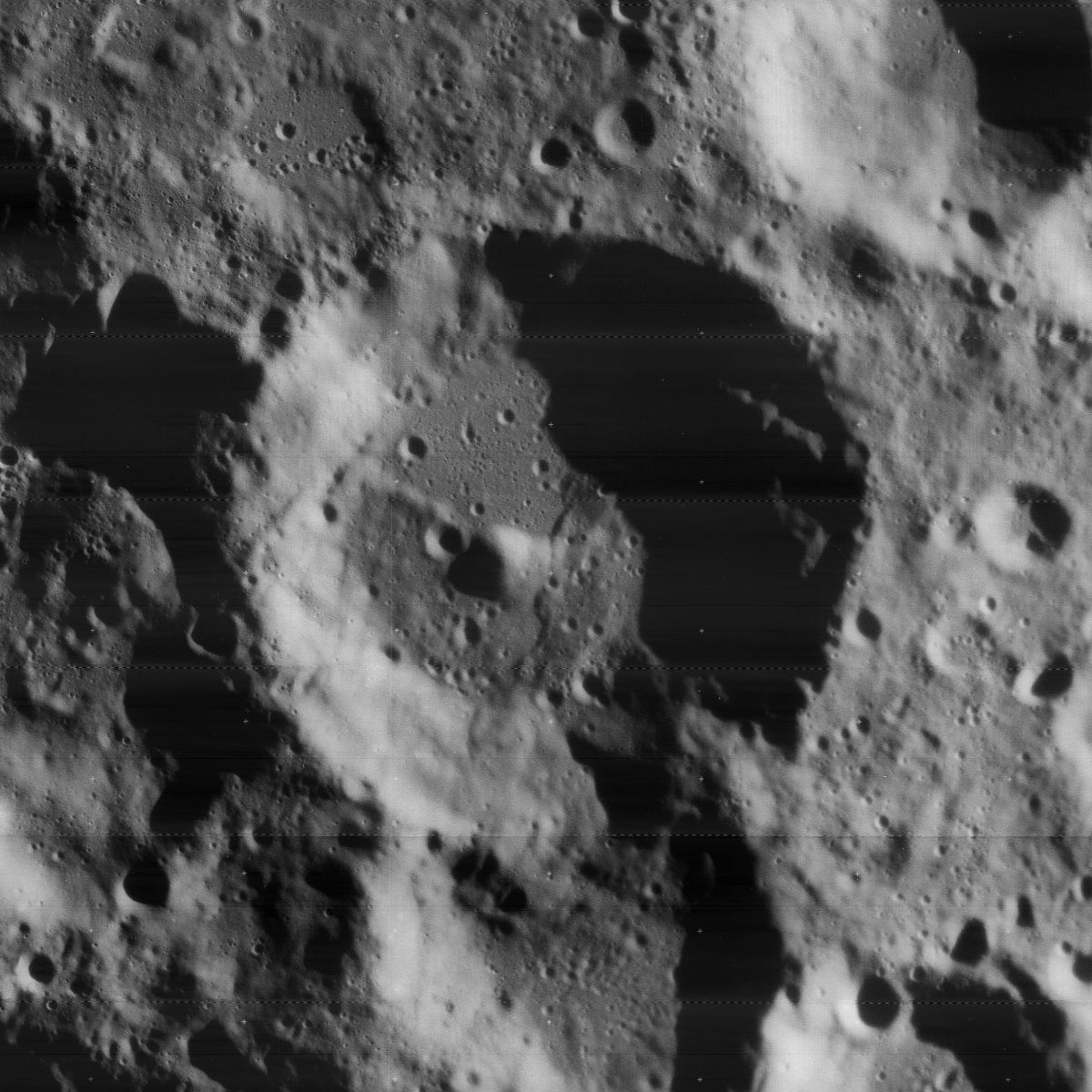
- Lunar Orbiter 4 image
- Coordinates: 64.6°S 11.5°E
- Diameter: 56 km
- Depth: 2.8 km
- Colongitude: 350° at sunrise
- Eponym: Joseph B. Pentland

Pentland is a lunar impact crater that lies in the southern part of the Moon, and appears foreshortened when viewed from the Earth. About one crater diameter to the southwest is the larger crater Curtius, and to the north-northwest lies Zach.

The rim of this crater is somewhat worn, and it has a depression along the southern edge where it is attached to a small crater on the exterior. The inner wall retains some structure in places, and has a shelf along the northeast side. The interior floor is level, with an elongated central rise at the midpoint. Otherwise the floor is nearly featureless, except for a few tiny craterlets.

== Satellite craters ==
By convention these features are identified on lunar maps by placing the letter on the side of the crater midpoint that is closest to Pentland.

Pentland	Latitude	Longitude	Diameter
A	67.4° S	13.5° E	44 km
B	66.2° S	14.1° E	30 km
C	65.0° S	16.3° E	37 km
D	63.2° S	14.1° E	35 km
Da	62.9° S	14.3° E	54 km
E	67.9° S	13.4° E	11 km
F	62.1° S	11.3° E	12 km
J	64.4° S	14.6° E	9 km
K	66.7° S	17.7° E	12 km
L	65.6° S	17.8° E	2 km
M	64.5° S	17.2° E	7 km
N	63.5° S	17.2° E	25 km
O	63.0° S	18.3° E	15 km
P	67.7° S	14.5° E	8 km
