= Zachery =

Zachery is a male given name and variant of Zachary. It may refer to:

- Zachery Bradford (born 1999), American athlete specializing in pole vault
- Zachery Byrd, actor
- Zachery Kouwe (born 1978), communications strategist and journalist
- Zachery Peacock (born 1987), American basketball player
- Zachery Pop (born 1996), Canadian baseball pitcher
- Zachery Ty Bryan (born 1981), American actor and film producer
- Zachery Ziemek (born 1993), American athlete

== See also ==
- James Zachery (1958–1994), American football player
