= Zach (crater) =

Lunar surface depression

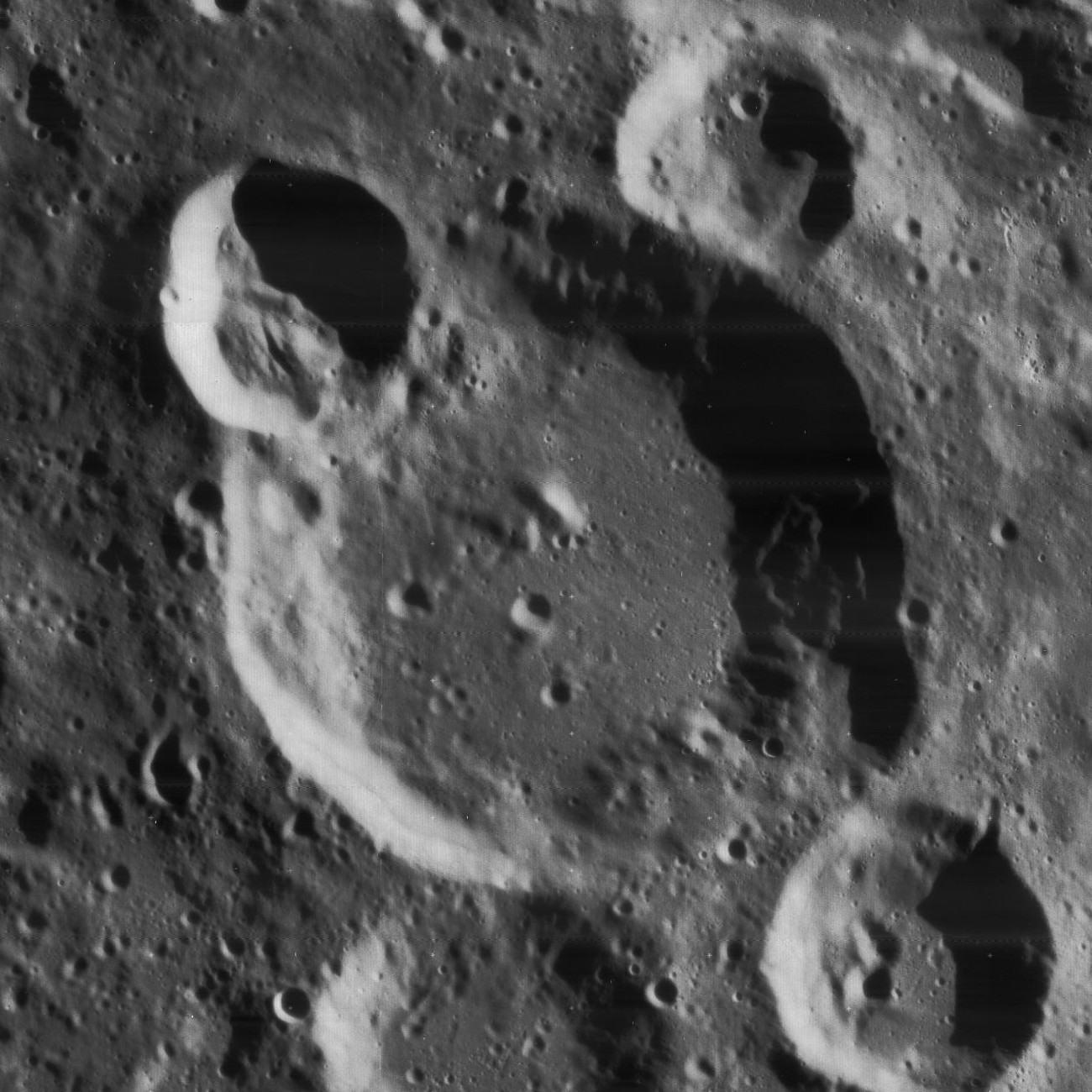
- Lunar Orbiter 4 image
- Coordinates: 60.9°S 5.3°E
- Diameter: 71 km (44 mi)
- Depth: 3.7 km (2.3 mi)
- Colongitude: 355° at sunrise
- Eponym: Franz Xaver von Zach

Zach is a lunar impact crater located in the heavily cratered southern sector of the Moon. British astronomer T. W. Webb called it "magnificently terraced". To the north is the crater Lilius, while to the southeast is Pentland and to the south the larger Curtius. Due to foreshortening, the crater has an oblong appearance when viewed from Earth. The crater is 71 kilometres (44 mi) in diameter and 3.7 kilometres (2.3 mi) deep. It is from the Nectarian period, 3.92 to 3.85 billion years ago.

The inner walls of the crater are prominently terraced, while parts of the outer wall are indented by lesser craters. There are adjacent craters attached to the northeast, southwest, and southern parts of the rim. There is also a pair of overlapping craters on the northwest rim. The bottom is relatively flat with a few craterlets and a double central peak offset to the north.

The crater is named for Franz Xaver, Baron Von Zach, a 19th-century Hungarian astronomer.

== Satellite craters ==
By convention, features are identified on lunar maps by placing the respective letter to the side of the crater midpoint closest to Zach:

Zach	Latitude	Longitude	Diameter
A	62.5° S	5.1° E	36 km
B	58.6° S	3.0° E	32 km
C	58.5° S	1.3° E	13 km
D	62.1° S	7.9° E	32 km
E	59.4° S	6.3° E	24 km
F	60.0° S	3.2° E	28 km
G	58.4° S	0.5° E	6 km
H	59.0° S	2.9° E	7 km
J	57.4° S	4.7° E	11 km
K	57.4° S	6.2° E	9 km
L	58.1° S	6.9° E	16 km
M	57.1° S	7.0° E	5 km
