= Tacha =

Tacha is a surname. Notable people with the surname include:

- Athena Tacha (born 1936), Greek artist
- Deanell Reece Tacha (born 1946), American judge

== See also ==
- Zacha
