= Zac =

Zac is a masculine given name, often a short form (hypocorism) of Zachary. It may refer to:

== People ==
- Zac Alexander (born 1989), Australian professional squash player
- Zac Brooks (born 1993), American National Football League player
- Zac Brown (born 1978), lead singer and guitarist of the American country music band Zac Brown Band
- Zac Champion (born 1984), American football player
- Zac Clarke (born 1990), Australian rules footballer
- Zac Curtis (born 1992), American Major League Baseball pitcher
- Zac Dalpe (born 1989), Canadian National Hockey League player
- Zac Dawson (born 1986), Australian rules footballer
- Zac Derr, American football player
- Zac Dysert (born 1990), American National Football League quarterback
- Zac Efron (born 1987), American actor and singer
- Zac Elkin (born 1991), South African cricketer
- Zac Evans (born 1991), Welsh footballer
- Zac Farro (born 1990), American musician
- Zac Foley (1970–2002), British musician, bass guitarist for EMF
- Zac Goldsmith (born 1975), British Conservative politician and journalist
- Zac Guildford (born 1989), New Zealand rugby union player
- Zac Hanson (born 1985), American musician, best known as a member of the pop rock band Hanson
- Zac Henderson (1955–2020), American former National Football League and Canadian Football League player
- Zac Holtzman, American guitarist and co-founder of the band Dengue Fever
- Zac Kerin (born 1991), American National Football League player
- Zac Kristofak (born 1997), American baseball player
- Zac Lubin (born 1989), American soccer player
- Zac MacMath (born 1991), American soccer player
- Zac Morris (born 1978), English former cricketer
- Zac Perry, American politician
- Zac Posen (born 1980), American fashion designer
- Zac Purton (born 1983), horse racing jockey
- Zac Rinaldo (born 1990), Canadian ice hockey player
- Zac Rosscup (born 1988), American Major League Baseball pitcher
- Zac Santo (born 1993), Australian rugby league footballer
- Zac Smith (born 1990), Australian rules footballer
- Zac Stacy (born 1991), American football player
- Zac Sunderland (born 1991), American sailor, first person under the age of 18 to sail solo around the world
- Zac Taylor (born 1983), American football coach and former quarterback
- Zac Williams (cyclist) (born 1995), New Zealand cyclist
- Zac Zorn (born 1947), American former swimmer

== In fiction ==
- Zac MacGuire in the Australian soap opera Home and Away
- Zac Smith (Shortland Street) in the New Zealand soap opera Shortland Street
- Zac (Battlestar Galactica) in the original Battlestar Galactica TV series
- Zac (Shimmer and Shine), in the TV series Shimmer and Shine
- Zac, the Secret Weapon, a playable character in multiplayer online battle arena video game League of Legends

== See also ==
- Zack (disambiguation)
- Zechariah (given name)
- Zachary
- Zak (given name)
- Zack (given name)
- Zach (given name)
