= ZAC =

ZAC may refer to:

- Zeitschrift für Antikes Christentum, an academic journal covering early Christianity and Patristics
- Zinc-activated ion channel, a human protein
- ZAC Browser (Zone for Autistic Children), a web browser for children and teenagers with autism and autism spectrum disorders
- Zone d'aménagement concerté -- French wikilink to "Zone of concentrated rehabilitation"
- IATA airport code for York Landing Airport, in Manitoba, Canada
- zac, the ISO 639-3 code for the Ocotlán Zapotec, a language part of the Zapotec languages family

== See also ==
- Zac, a given name
