= Gruemberger (crater) =

Lunar surface depression

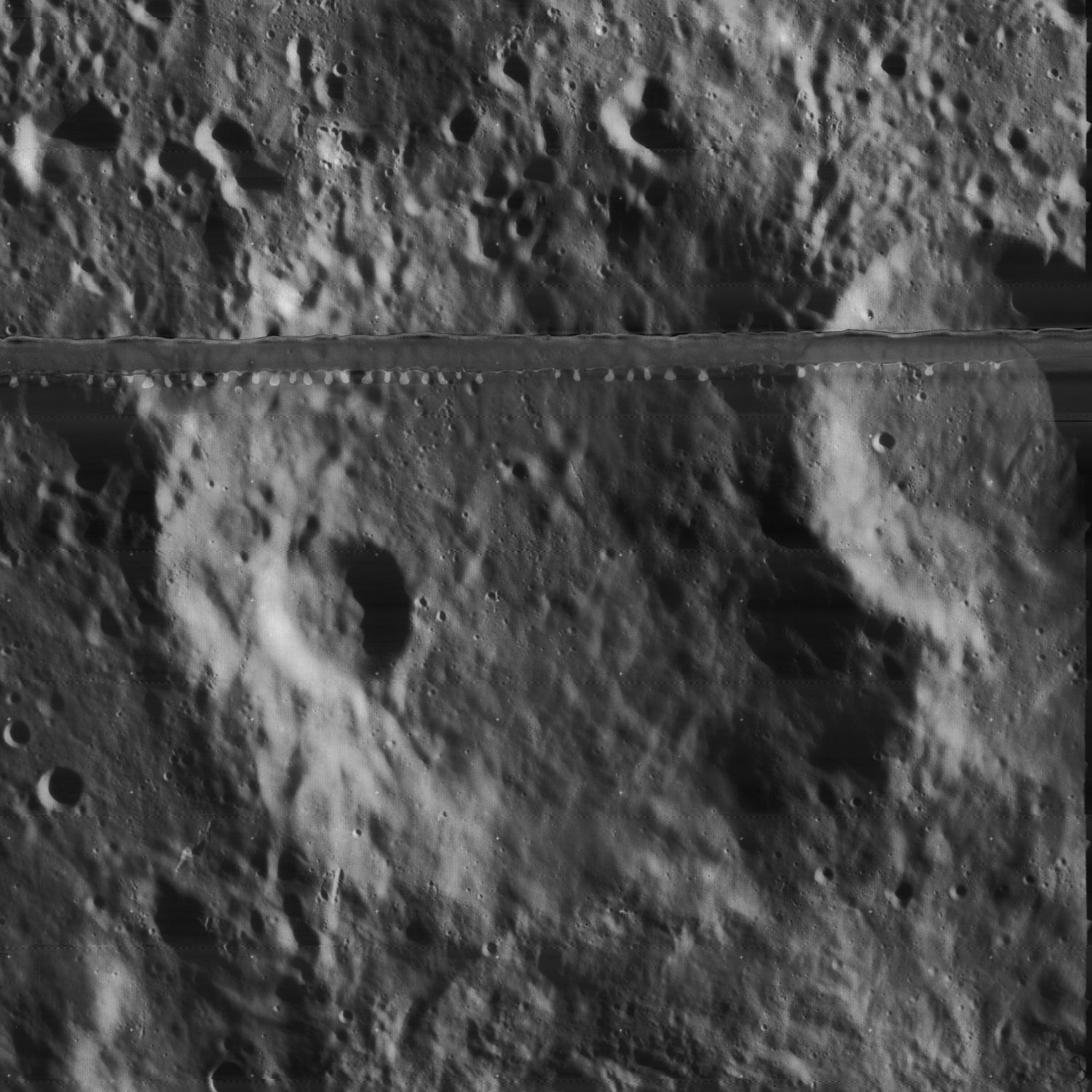
- Lunar Orbiter 4 image. Horizontal band is blemish on original.
- Coordinates: 66.9°S 10.0°W
- Diameter: 93 km
- Depth: 4.4 km
- Colongitude: 12° at sunrise
- Eponym: Christoph Grienberger

Gruemberger is an old impact crater in the southern part of the Moon. When viewed from the Earth this crater appears oval in shape due to foreshortening, but it is actually relatively circular. The crater lies about 25 kilometers to the north-northwest of the larger and more prominent crater Moretus. The smaller crater Cysatus intrudes into the eastern rim of Gruemberger. About one and a half crater diameters to the north is the large crater Clavius.

This crater has undergone steady erosion from minor impacts, so that the features along the rim and inner wall have become softened and rounded. Significant impacts nearby have covered the floor and sides with ejecta, and there are a multitude of tiny craterlets along the inner wall. The satellite crater Gruemberger A lies within the interior, along the inner wall to the west-southwest.

== Satellite craters ==
By convention these features are identified on lunar maps by placing the letter on the side of the crater midpoint that is closest to Gruemberger.

Gruemberger	Latitude	Longitude	Diameter
A	67.2° S	11.8° W	20 km
B	64.6° S	9.0° W	31 km
C	65.9° S	15.3° W	13 km
D	68.1° S	14.4° W	5 km
E	63.6° S	7.1° W	9 km
F	62.9° S	6.3° W	7 km
