= Moretus (crater) =

Lunar surface depression

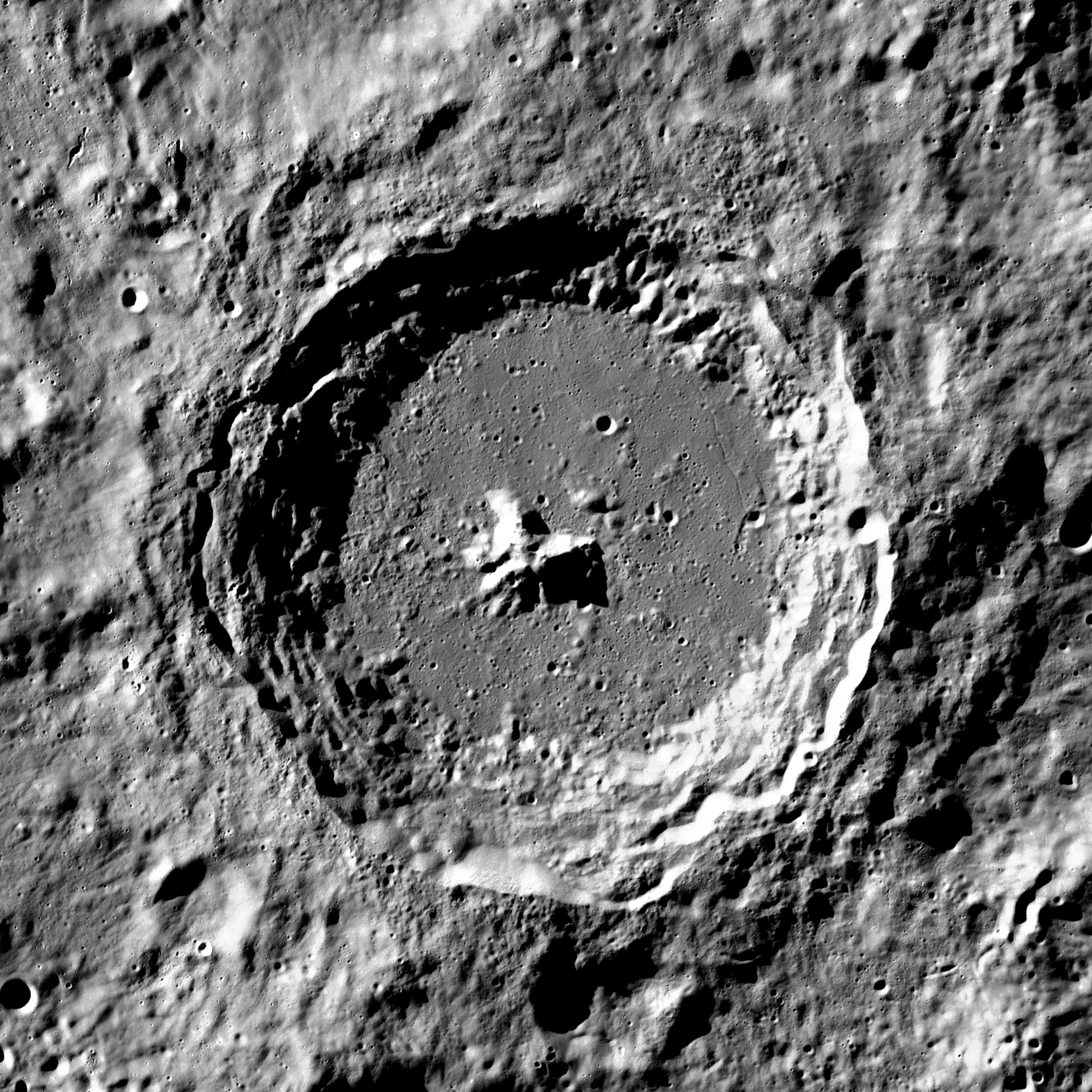
- LRO image
- Coordinates: 70.6°S 5.5°W
- Diameter: 114 km
- Depth: 5.0 km
- Colongitude: 7° at sunrise
- Formation: Imbrian
- Eponym: Theodorus Moretus

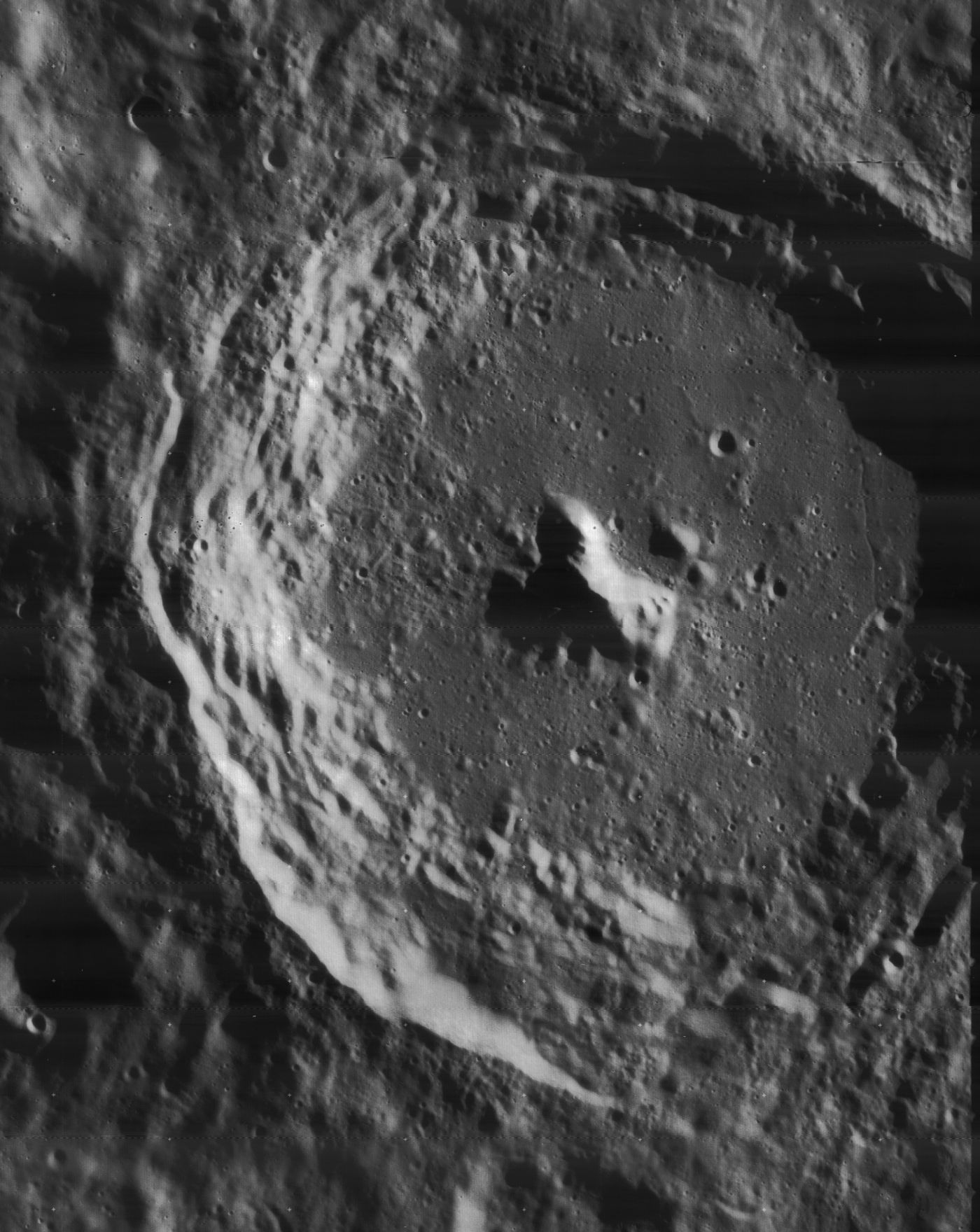
Lunar Orbiter 4 image.

Moretus is a lunar impact crater located in the heavily cratered highland region near the south pole of the Moon.

South of Moretus, the crater Short is located, while to the north is Cysatus. To the northwest lies Gruemberger, and Curtius is located to the northeast. Due to the location near the lunar limb, the crater appears oblong because of foreshortening. The crater is named after the 17th-century Flemish mathematician and geometer Theodorus Moretus.

On the lunar geologic timescale, this formation dates to the Imbrian period. The rim of the crater has a wide, terraced inner wall, and a complex outer rampart. The floor has been partly resurfaced and is relatively flat. In the middle is a central mountain formation that rises about 2.1 kilometers above the surrounding floor. The infrared spectrum of pure crystalline plagioclase has been identified on this rise.

== Satellite craters ==
By convention these features are identified on lunar maps by placing the letter on the side of the crater midpoint that is closest to Moretus.

Moretus	Latitude	Longitude	Diameter
A	70.4° S	13.8° W	32 km
C	72.6° S	11.2° W	17 km
