= Zak (surname) =

Zak is a surname. It can be related to both Żak, a Polish surname, and Žák, a Czech surname. However, in the case of Jews, it can be a variant of the German surname Sachs, the patronymic variant of the Hebrew biblical male personal name Yitzchak/Isaac, or it can originate in the acronym surname Za'K, which stands for the Hebrew words Zera Kodesh, literally meaning 'Holy Seed', a quotation from Isaiah 6:13 implying descent from martyrs. In the variant Zaks, the final letter of the acronym can make the phrase Zera Kodesh Shemo, 'his name descends from martyrs', or it may refer to the town of martyrdom, such as Speyer, Zera Kodesh Speyer, or Stendal.

Zak is also a variant Romanization of the Chinese surname 石 (shí), based on its pronunciation in the Shanghai dialect, meaning the dry measure for grain equal to ten dou 斗, one hundred liters, rock, stone, stone inscription, or one of the eight categories of ancient musical instruments 八音 (bā yīn).

== Notable people with the surname ==
Notable people with the surname include:

- Anna Zak (born 2001), Israeli social media personality, model, and singer
- Eugeniusz Zak (1884–1926), Belarusian artist also known as Eugene Zak
- Frankie Zak (1922–1972), American Major League baseball player
- Fyodor Zak (born 1949), Russian mathematician
- Gershon Zak (1913–1989), Commander of the Israeli Navy
- John C. Zak (born 1954), American director, producer, and filmmaker
- Leocadia I. Zak, Director of the U.S. Trade and Development Agency beginning 2009
- Paul J. Zak (born 1962), American neuro-economist
- Peter Zak (born 1965), American jazz pianist and composer

== Fictional characters ==
- Piotr Zak, a fictional 'Polish composer', who featured in a famous BBC broadcasting hoax in 1961
- Rowena "Randy" Zak, a pre-teenage girl from the Girl Talk (books) series
