= Zahari (name) =

Zahari is both a given name and a surname. Notable people with the name include:

== Given name ==
- Airil Rizman Zahari (born 1978), Malaysian golfer
- Adly Zahari (born 1971), Malaysian politician
- Azri Zahari (born 1992), Bruneian footballer
- Mohd Shafei Zahari (born 1993), Malaysian footballer
- Rahimidin Zahari (1968-2015), Malaysian poet
- Said Zahari, Singaporean journalist
- Shafie Zahari (born 1993), Malaysian footballer
- Zahari Baharov (born 1980), Bulgarian actor
- Zahari Dimitrov (born 1975), Bulgarian footballer
- Zahari Kechik (born 1960), Malaysian politician
- Zahari Sirakov (born 1977), Bulgarian footballer
- Zahari Stoyanov (1850–1889), Bulgarian revolutionary
- Zahari Zhandov (1911–1998), Bulgarian film director
- Zahari Zograf (1810–1853), Bulgarian painter
