= Zacharia, Democratic Republic of the Congo =

Zacharias
- Town
- Location within Democratic Republic of the Congo
- Coordinates: 0°24′N 28°52′E
- Country: Democratic Republic of the Congo
- Province: North Kivu
- Territory: Lubero Territory
- Time zone: UTC+2 (CAT)
- Climate: Af
- National language: Swahili

Zacharias is a small town in North Kivu in eastern Democratic Republic of the Congo. It is located just to the south of Mbunia.
