= Ibrahim Zakaria =

Ibrahim Zakaria is the name of:

- Ibrahim Zakaria (scout), Syrian scout leader
- Ibrahim Zakaria (trade unionist) (1929–1993), Sudanese trade union leader
