= Death of Raymond Zack =

2011 death in California, United States

On May 30, 2011 (Memorial Day), 53-year-old Raymond Zack, of Alameda, California, walked into the waters off Robert Crown Memorial Beach and stood neck deep in water roughly 150 yards offshore for almost an hour. His foster mother, Dolores Berry, called 9-1-1 and said that he couldn't swim and was trying to drown himself. There are conflicting reports about Zack's intentions.

City of Alameda firefighters and police responded but did not enter the water. The firefighters called for a United States Coast Guard boat to respond to the scene. The boat the Coast Guard sent drafted too deep for the shallow water off the beach. No boat ever arrived.

According to police reports, Alameda police expected the firefighters to enter the water. Firefighters later said that they did not have current training and certifications to perform land-based water rescue, and that funding for the program was cut. However, a memo soon surfaced that contradicted the lack-of-funding claim. Local agencies disputed whether or not the Alameda Fire Department or Alameda Police Department made requests for mutual aid, such as a request for a shallow-water boat.

Dozens of civilians on the beach, and watching from their homes across from the beach, did not enter the water, apparently expecting public safety officers to conduct a rescue. A bystander took off her shoes, preparing to enter the water, but was told by a police officer not to, to let public safety personnel handle it. Eventually, Zack collapsed in the water, apparently from hypothermia. Even then, nobody entered the water for over twenty minutes even as his body drifted, face down, back towards the beach. Finally, a young woman entered the water and pulled Zack to shore. Zack died afterwards at a local hospital.

The event made international headlines, and was covered on CNN, Fox News, USA Today and regional media outlets.

== Public reaction ==
Members of the local community were outraged. In May 2012, Alameda residents held a "wade-out" in memory of Zack, and to demonstrate how public safety officials might have reacted differently to preserve Zack's life.

Local residents filed complaints with a state agency that oversees paramedics; however, those complaints were dismissed.

The event prompted "widespread public outrage," and a number of commentaries on ethics, linking the event to the bystander effect.

== City of Alameda reaction ==
In the aftermath of Zack's death, the City of Alameda contracted with Ruben Grijalva to conduct an investigation and produce a report. His 67-page report "found that the death was caused by a breakdown in communications and a lack of training." In the intervening period, a memo surfaced that contradicted the fire chief's claim that Zack's death was due to a lack of funding for water rescue programs.

== Zack family lawsuit ==
In October 2011, members of Zack's birth family filed claims against the City of Alameda and Alameda County, and eventually sued both agencies over Zack's death. In May 2012, Zack's family filed suit in Alameda County Superior Court. (The Alameda County Regional Emergency Communications Center, a.k.a. ACRECC, handles radio dispatch for the City of Alameda Fire Department.) In early 2013, a judge dismissed the lawsuit, saying public safety officials had no legal duty to save Zack.

== Documentary ==
In 2015, filmmaker Jaime Longhi released to film festivals his 35-minute documentary Shallow Waters: The Public Death of Raymond Zack which examines events of the day that Zack died. In 2015, the documentary screened at the Awareness Film Festival in Los Angeles, the Global Peace Film Festival in Orlando, Florida, Indiefest in La Jolla, California and won Best Documentary prize at the New Hope Film Festival in 2016. The film screened in Alameda for the first time on January 31, 2016, at the Michaan Auction House Theater at Alameda Point in the presence of many witnesses and the new mayor of Alameda. Zack's mother, Delores Berry, was present as well. It was boycotted by the local fire department.

== 2017–2018 Alameda City Manager scandal ==
In October 2017, Daniel Borenstein of the East Bay Times wrote an opinion piece about the firefighters union's attempt, including through two friendly city council members, to compel the city manager to name Captain Domenick Weaver the new fire chief. Weaver was the firefighter union president at the time of Zack's death. Borenstein's piece linked to an October 2, 2017 letter from the city manager to Alameda City Council, in which she wrote: "[...]The pressure to select [Weaver] as the new fire chief has been intense and unrelenting. Some of the specific instances include: [...] Written correspondence urging the selection of [Weaver] and a two-Councilmember meeting with me to suggest that the selection of their candidate would be in the interest of labor peace and would avoid an incident similar to the one involving Raymond Zack (this thinly veiled threat insults the very notion of good government)[.] [...]" Though Weaver's name was redacted from the letter as it was released by the city, Borenstein's article names Weaver as the candidate who was being promoted by the Union and the Councilmembers for the position.

== See also ==
- Civil courage
