= Johann Baptist Cysat =

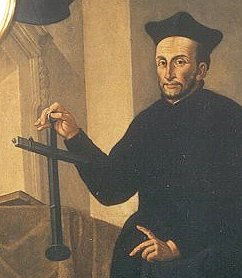
Johann Baptist Cysat, holding a Jacob's staff

Johann Baptist Cysat (Latinized as Cysatus; in French, Jean-Baptiste Cysat) (c. 1587 – March 17, 1657) was a Swiss Jesuit mathematician and astronomer, after whom the lunar crater Cysatus is named. He was born in Lucerne, as the eighth of 14 children, to cartographer, historian and folklorist Renward Cysat (1545–1614).

In 1604, Cysat joined the Jesuits and became a theology student in March 1611 in Ingolstadt. There he met Christoph Scheiner, whom he assisted in the latter’s observation of sunspots, whose discovery would later become a matter of dispute between Galileo and Scheiner.

In 1618, Cysat was named professor of mathematics at the University of Ingolstadt, succeeding Scheiner in this position, thereby allowing him to concern himself further with astronomical problems. Cysat became one of the first to make use of the newly developed telescope.

== Cysat and comets ==
Cysat's most important work was on comets, and he observed the comet of 1618. He published a monograph on the comet called Mathemata astronomica de loco, motu, magnitudine et causis cometae qui sub finem anni 1618 et initium anni 1619 in coelo fulsit. Ingolstadt Ex Typographeo Ederiano 1619 (Ingolstadt, 1619).

According to Cysat’s opinion, comets circled around the sun, and he demonstrated at the same time that the orbit of the comet was parabolic, not circular. Cysat’s observations on the comet are characterized by their great detail.

Cysat saw enough detail to be the first to describe cometary nuclei, and was able to track the progression of the nucleus from a solid shape to one filled with starry particles. Cysat’s drawings of cometary nuclei were included on the maps of others. His observations of the comet were so detailed that in 1804, he was still considered one of its excellent observers. This work also includes Cysat’s observations on the Orion Nebula (he is sometimes, probably erroneously, credited with its discovery), which he compared to the nature of the comet.

Cysat’s book is also remarkable due to the fact that it had been printed by a woman, Elizabeth Angermar. During the seventeenth century, regulations laid down by printing guilds sometimes allowed widows and daughters to take over their husbands’ or fathers’ businesses.

== Other work ==
Cysat observed the full lunar eclipse of 1620. He served as rector at the Jesuit College in Lucerne from 1624 to 1627. After a stay in Spain in 1627, where he taught at the Jesuit Colegio Imperial de Madrid, he returned to Ingolstadt in 1630 and served as rector in Innsbruck in 1637 and Eichstätt in 1646.

Johannes Kepler visited Cysat in Ingolstadt, but only one letter of their correspondence, dated February 23, 1621, survives. On November 7, 1631, Cysat was one of the four first observers of a transit of Mercury predicted by Kepler in 1631.

Cysat subsequently returned to his hometown of Lucerne, where he died on March 17, 1657. The Cysatus crater on the Moon was named after him.

== See also ==
- List of Jesuit scientists
- List of Roman Catholic scientist-clerics
