= Szymon Zacjusz =

Szymon Zacjusz or Szymon Żak (1507 in Proszowice – 1591 in Bochnia) was a Polish Protestant pastor, supporter of Reformation in Lesser Poland and the Grand Duchy of Lithuania.

He spent his childhood in Proszowice. In the years from 1523 to 1526 he studied at the Jagiellonian University in Kraków, where he passed his Licentiate. After the graduation he attended a castle school in Wawel where he was one of the best humanists at his time. He studied Greek, Latin and Hebrew languages.

After 1535 he established himself as a proponent of Calvinism. From 1540 to 1548 he was a Calvinist pastor in Krzyżanowice, near the town Bochnia. There he married Catherine Przeklotowna (Katarzyna Przeklotówna) and they had two daughters.

As a Calvinist he couldn't be buried at a Catholic cemetery near his town, so he was buried in his own garden in Bochnia.
