= Zack (given name) =

Zack (and variant spellings Zach, Zac, Zak, Zakk) is sometimes a given name, but more often it is a hypocorism or short form of another given name, usually Zachary in the English speaking world, which derives from Zechariah.

== Name ==
- Zack Annexstad (born 2000), American football player
- Zack Bailey (born 1995), American football player
- Zack Baun (born 1996), American football player
- Zack Bryant (born 1997), American basketball player
- Zack Conroy (born 1985), American actor
- Zack Cozart (born 1985), American baseball player
- Zack de la Rocha (born 1970), American lead singer of Rage Against the Machine
- Zack Fleishman (born 1980), American tennis player
- Zack Gelof (born 1999), American baseball player for the Oakland A's
- Zack Golditch (born 1995), American football player
- Zack Greinke (born 1983), American Major League Baseball player
- Zack Johnson (American football) (born 1997), American football player
- Zack Kassian (born 1991), Canadian NHL ice hockey player
- Zack Kuntz (born 1999), American football player
- Zack Marshall (born 2005), American football player
- Zack Martin (born 1990), American National Football League player
- Zack Mesday (born 1994), American football player
- Zack Morris (born 1998), English actor
- Zack Moss (born 1997), American football player
- Zack O'Malley Greenburg (born 1985), American writer, journalist, and former child-actor
- Zack Pinsent (born c. 1994), British costumer
- Zack Rosen (born 1989), All-American basketball player at Penn; plays for Maccabi Ashdod in Israel
- Zack Sanchez (born 1993), American football player
- Zack Shada (born 1992), American actor
- Zack Snyder (born 1966), American film director and screenwriter
- Zack Tabudlo (born 2001), Filipino singer-songwriter and producer
- Zack Test (born 1989), American rugby union player
- Zack Thornton (born 1988), American baseball player
- Zack Weiss (born 1992), American-Israeli Major League Baseball player
- Zack Werenski (born 1997), American NHL ice hockey player
- Zack Werner, Canadian artist, producer, lawyer and manager in the music industry
- Zack Wheat (1888–1972), American Major League Baseball player

== In fiction ==
- Zack, the main character in Zack & Quack, an animated television series
- Zack, one of the title characters of the video game Zack & Wiki: Quest for Barbaros' Treasure
- Zack (Dead or Alive), in the video game series Dead or Alive
- Zack Addy, in the television series Bones
- Zack Allan, in the television series Babylon 5
- Zack Martin, in the television series The Suite Life of Zack and Cody and its sequels.
- Zack Nichols, in the American police procedural television drama Law & Order: Criminal Intent
- Zack Fair, in the role-playing game Final Fantasy VII and its spin-offs
- Zack Girdle in the animated TV series Louds
- Zack Hudson, in the British soap opera EastEnders
- Zack Mooneyham, a character in School of Rock
- Zack Morris (Saved by the Bell), in television series Saved by the Bell
- Zack Taylor, in the television series Mighty Morphin Power Rangers
- Zack Underwood, one of the main characters in Milo Murphy's Law
- Zack Lane, in the novel Zack by William Bell
- Zack, in the computer game The Daedalus Encounter
- Zack, Kamen Rider Knuckle in Kamen Rider Gaim
- Zack Johnson, in The Big Bang Theory
- Zack, the leader of the chuggineers.

== See also ==
- Zechariah (given name)
- Zachary
- Zak (given name)
- Zach (given name)
- Zac
