= Renward Cysat =

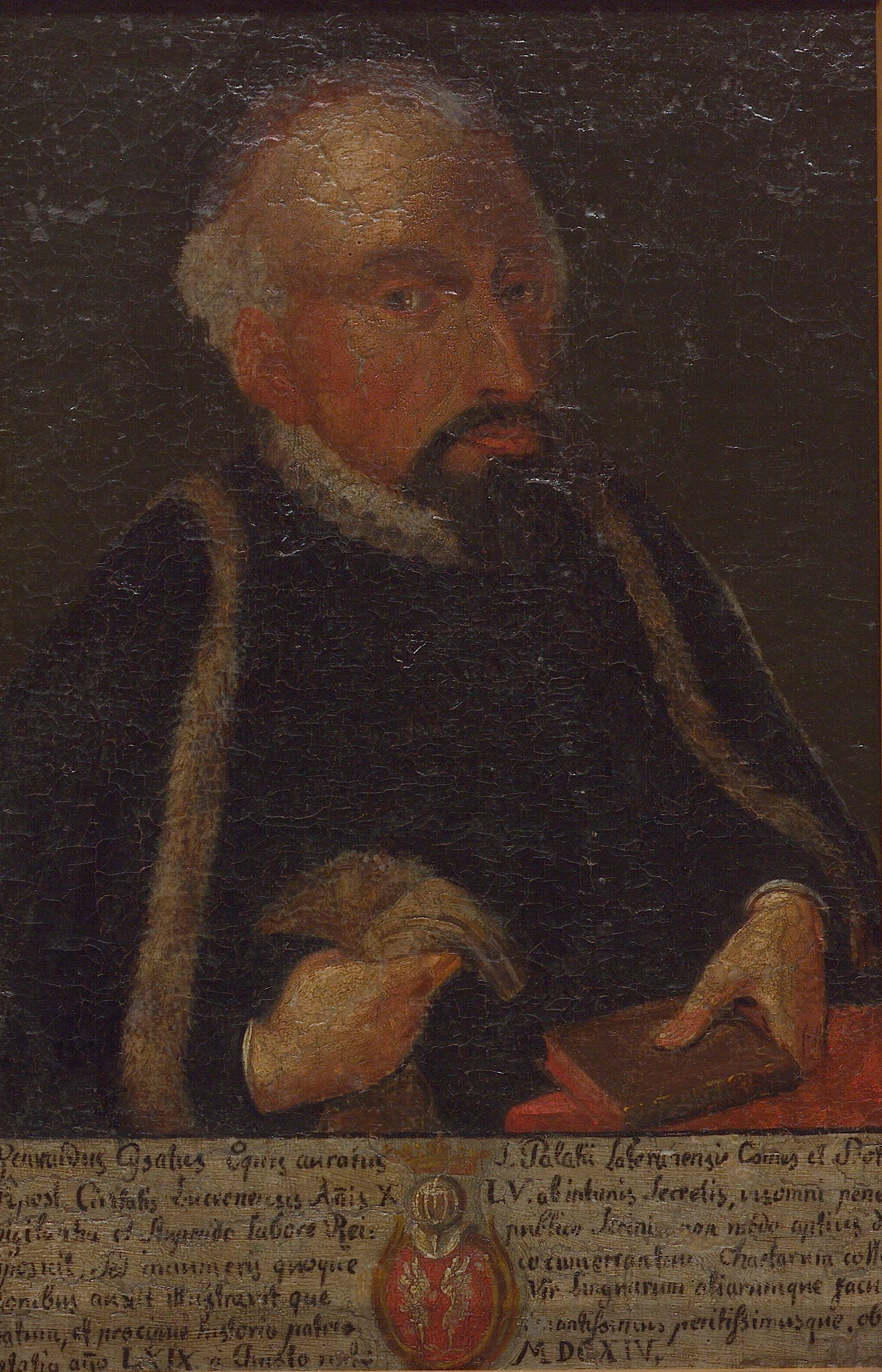
portrait of Renward Cysat

Renward Cysat (Cusatus; 1545–1614) was an apothecary, advocate, cartographer and city councillor of Lucerne. He is the father of mathematician and astronomer Johann Baptist Cysat.

Cysat published works about the history and folklore of Lucerne, as well as a number of theatrical plays, and a book about (then-recently discovered) Japan. He was responsible for the first map of the canton of Lucerne, published in 1613. Cysat was given the honorary title of count palatine by pope Gregory XIII in 1576.
