= Zenobia Żaczek =

Polish activist (born 1974)

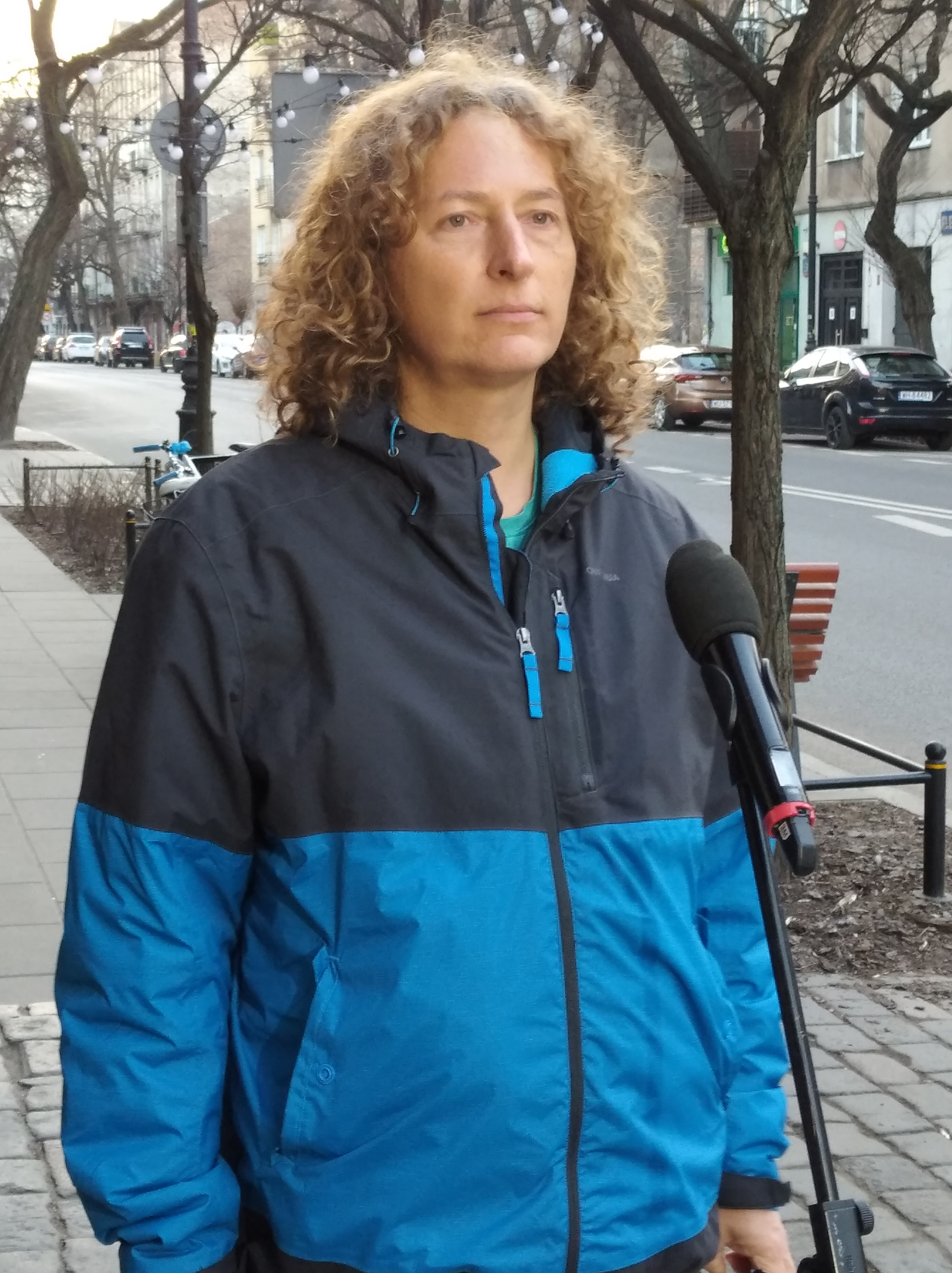
- Żaczek in 2022
- Born: 1974 (age 50–51)
- Known for: Activist for tenant's rights

Zenobia Żaczek (born 1974, formerly Jakub Żaczek, née Gawlikowski) is a Polish activist for the rights of tenants.

== Activism ==
Zaczek founded Komitet Obrony Praw Lokatorów (Committee for the Defense of Tenants' Rights) with her partner, Laura, in the late 2000s.

== Personal life ==
She is a transgender woman. Although she began medically transitioning in early 2021, she did not come out publicly, fearing it would jeopardize her activism.

As of 2021, Żaczek lives in Praga, Warsaw with her partner. She labels herself as an anarcho-syndicalist.

== See also ==
- Anarchism in Poland
