= Josef Žáček =

Czech painter (born 1951)

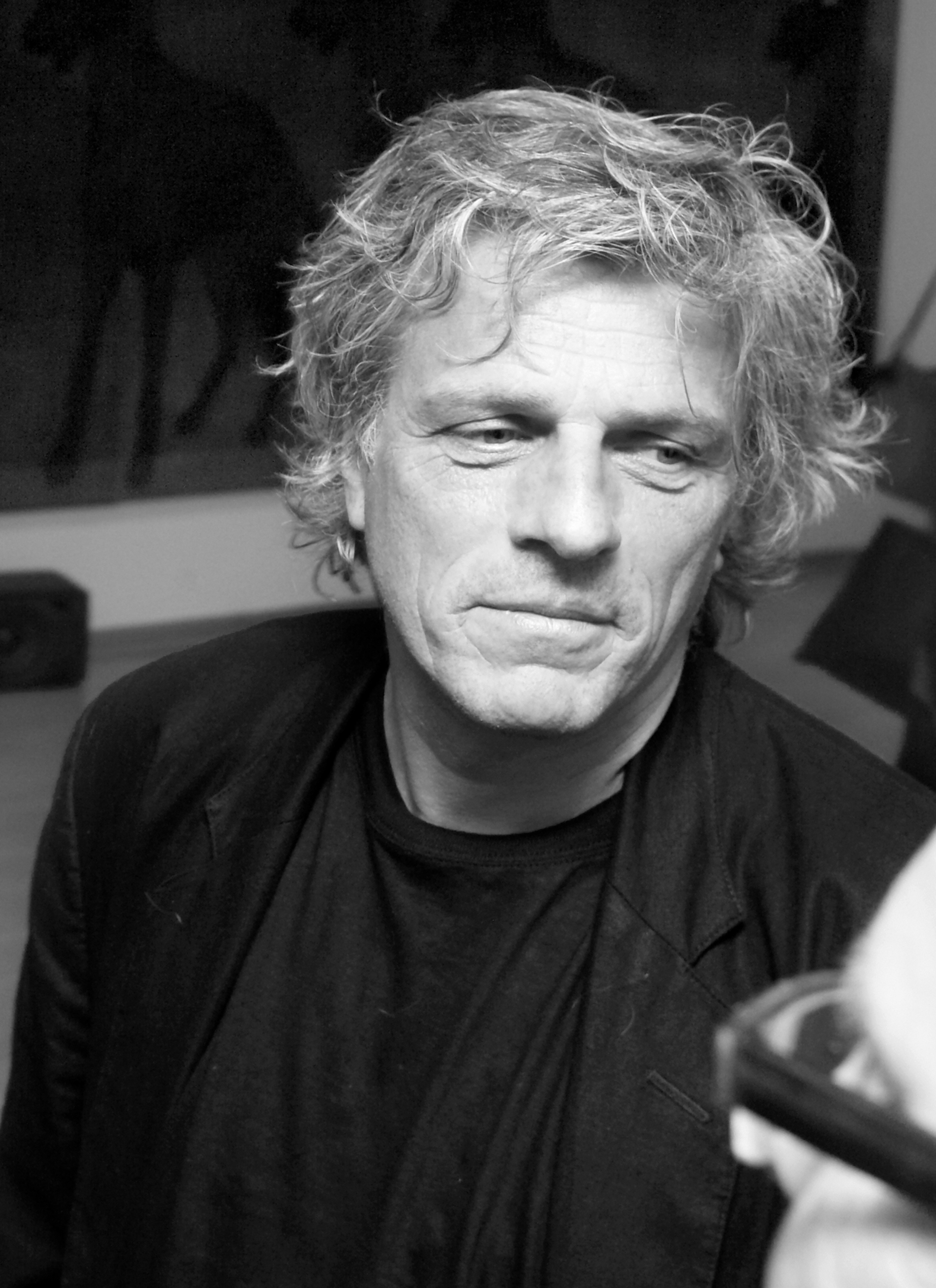
- Josef Zacek
- Born: 1951 (age 74–75); Prague, Czech Republic
- Education: Academy of Fine Arts in Prague
- Known for: Painting
- Movement: Art as Activism

Josef Žáček (born 1951 in Prague) is a Czech painter. He graduated from Academy of Fine Arts in Prague in 1983.

Josef Žáček's own visual language was based on geometric signs and later figural symbols through which he came to address universal issues of cultural identity and memory as well as wholly concrete phenomena of the contemporary world. In his work is frequently used principle of a central motif. The same motif appears several times alongside itself, either in paintings arranged next to each other or within the composition of a single picture.

Žáček's work stems from a clearly determined content; it reflects social and political contexts. His monumental canvases are usually monochrome compositions.

In the late 1980s, before the fall of the Communist regime, he belonged to a group of young artists who were no longer members of the conformist Artists’ Union and wanted to exhibit freely. After efforts lasting considerable time, they succeeded in pushing through the first official gallery whose programme could include any artist. It was then that the U Řečických Youth Gallery in Prague began creating freer conditions; even non-professional artists could be invited there as guest exhibitors – meaning those who had not, for various reasons, been able to get to art college. In January 1989 he had first major exhibition at the Youth Gallery in Prague, which featured canvases in abstraction shapes on the theme of The Gospel of St Matthew.

In 1994 Žáček exhibited a series of paintings at the Behémot Gallery in Prague that were inspired by events that had occurred in 1993 in Bad Kleinen. The series of evocative portraits of wanted members of the Red Army Faction entitled Searching in Lost Space 1993 is not a celebration of violent solutions, rather it highlights how society has evolved in an unnatural direction. The source of the Žáček's portrets was a police posters of wanted R. A. F. activists announcing the reward for their capture.

In 1995 at Prague City Gallery he presented the large composition Madonna of Prosperity, an allegory of Albrecht Dürer’s ‘Feast of the Rose-garlands’, portraying in sign-form a striking phenomenon of the new age: consumerist madness and the rise of adoration for money.

Another of Josef Žáček's most striking series of paintings are: Birds of heaven (1992, 2G, Gegenwart, Berlin), Searching in Lost Space (1994, Behémot Gallery, Prague), When Lemmings Fly... (1995, Prague City Gallery ), Universe (1998, Behémot Gallery), Eyes of the City (2002, Behémot Gallery), The Genius Loci (2004, Critics’ Gallery in Prague), Dream of the Apocalypse (2007, North Bohemian Gallery of Fine Art in Litoměřice), The Landscape (2010, NoD Gallery), Whispers (2011, Dox Prague), Loneliness (2013, Topičův salon), Anticorps (2016, Prague City Gallery)

In 2011 Žacek presented at the DOX Centre for Contemporary Art in Prague, a new series of paintings, entitled No Comment a group portraits of six young men who, in Russia's Far East, declared a guerrilla war in 2010 against corruption and police brutality. The group, which called itself the “Primorsky Partisans", became notorious across Russia. The artist was inspired by the video posted on internet by the group to explain the motives behind their actions.

== Bibliography ==
- Klimešová, Marie; Drury, Richard; Kotalík, Tomáš; Slavická, Milena; Jirous, Ivan Martin (2005), Czech studios- 71 contemporary artists, Prague: Art CZ, ISBN 978-80-239-5528-6
- Gasparoli, Roberto (1993), Josef Žáček, Fondazione Bick di S. Abbondio: Artest '93
- Kosik, Antonín; Rezek, Petr; Čiháková Noshiro, Vlasta (2002), Josef Žáček 90.léta, Praha: Galerie Behémot
- Pánková, Marcela; Rezek, Petr; Kozelka, Milan (1995), Až budou lumíci létat.../Once lemmings fly up..., Galerie hlavního města Prahy, ISBN 80-7010-041-9
- Milan Kozelka: Startuji do San Francisca, Vetus Via, Prague, 2016 ISBN 978-80-87422-21-2
- Hlaváček, Ludvik; Juříková, Magdalena; Kozelka, Milan (2017), Anticorps, Galerie hlavního města Prahy, ISBN 978-80-7010-124-7
