= Zacarías Supisiche =

General Zacarías Supisiche
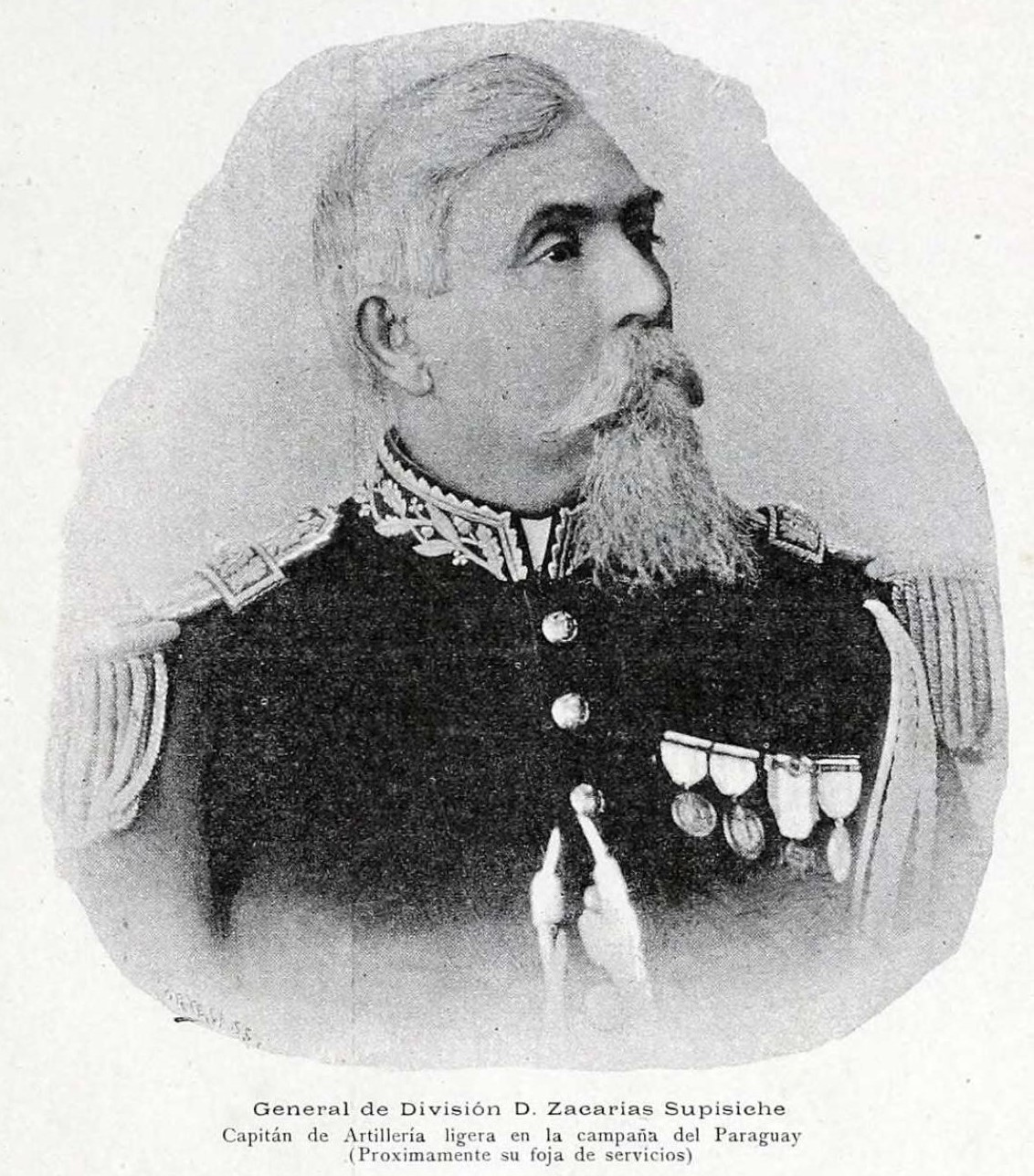
- Gral. Zacarías Supisiche

Personal details
- Born: February 9, 1843 Buenos Aires, Argentina
- Died: October 22, 1897 (aged 54) Buenos Aires, Argentina
- Resting place: La Recoleta Cemetery
- Party: National Autonomist Party
- Spouse: Isabel Sarmiento
- Parent(s): Antonio Supisiche; Juana Comas
- Occupation: army
- Profession: military man

Military service
- Allegiance: State of Buenos Aires (1852-1861) (Argentina) Argentine Republic
- Branch/service: Argentine Army
- Years of service: 1859-1897
- Rank: General
- Commands: Legión Valiente; 1st Escuadron del 1° Regimiento de Artillería
- Battles/wars: Battle of Cepeda; Battle of Pavón; Battle of the Paso de la Patria; Battle of Itapirú; Battle of Estero Bellaco; Battle of Tuyutí; Battle of Yataytí Corá; Battle of Curupayty; National Campaign against López Jordán; Revolution of 1874; Battle of the Plaza Libertad

Zacarías Supisiche (1843–1897) was an Argentine military man, who participated in the Argentine Civil War and Paraguayan War. He began his military career fighting against troops of General Justo José de Urquiza, taking an active part during the battles of Cepeda and Pavón.

His military campaigns also include his participation in the Conquest of the Desert, and the Conquest of the Chaco. He was part of the troops loyal to the Government during Revolution of the Park, serving as head of the City Garrison participated in the Battle of Plaza Libertad against the radical revolutionaries.

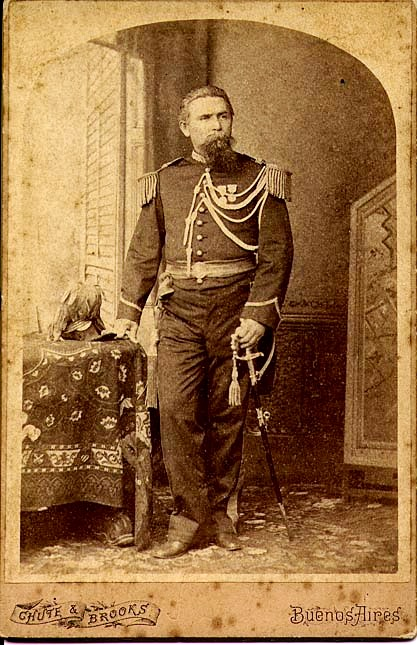
daguerreotype of General Supisiche
