= Zak (given name) =

Zak (or Zakk) is a given name derived from Zachary or Zechariah/Zachariah.

== People ==
- Zak Abel (born 1995), English singer/songwriter, musician, and Cadet national table tennis champion
- Zak Ansah (born 1994), English-born Ghanaian footballer
- Zak Arogundade (born 1994), British-Swedish singer better known as Ecco2k
- Zak Bagans (born 1977), American paranormal investigator, actor and author, host of the television series Ghost Adventures
- Zak Boggs (born 1986), American soccer player
- Zak Brown (born 1971), American businessman and former racing driver
- Zak Calisto (born 1966/1967), South African billionaire businessman
- Zak Chappell (born 1996), English cricketer
- Zak Chelli (born 1997), English professional boxer
- Zak Crawley (born 1998), English cricketer
- Zak Cummings (born 1984), American mixed martial artist
- Zak Dempster (born 1987), Australian racing cyclist
- Zak DeOssie (born 1984), American National Football League player
- Zak Hardaker (born 1991), English rugby league footballer
- Zak Hill (born 1981), American football coach
- Zak Ibsen (born 1972), American retired soccer player
- Zak Jones (born 1995), Australian rules footballer
- Zak Keasey (born 1982), American former National Football League player
- Zak Keith, British guitarist
- Zak Kent (born 1998), American baseball player
- Zak Ketterson (born 1997), American cross-country skier
- Zak Knutson (born 1974) American director, producer, writer and actor
- Zak Miller (born 1997), English professional boxer
- Zak Morioka (born 1978), Brazilian racecar driver
- Zak Orth (born 1970), American actor
- Zak Ové (born 1966), British visual artist
- Zak Penn (born 1968), American screenwriter and director
- Zak Perzamanos (born 2003), British trampoline gymnast
- Zak Sally, bassist and comic artist
- Zak Smith (born 1976), also known as Zak Sabbath, American artist and adult film performer
- Zak Starkey (born 1965), English rock drummer, son of Ringo Starr
- Zak Surety (born 1991), English snooker player
- Zak Sutcliffe (born 2001), English actor
- Zak Waters (born 1966), British editorial photographer
- Zak Whitbread (born 1984), American-born English footballer
- Zakk Wylde (born 1967), American guitarist for Ozzy Osbourne and founder of Black Label Society
- Zak Yacoob (born 1948), a former justice of the Constitutional Court of South Africa
- Zak Zinter (born 2001), American football player

== Fictional characters ==
- Zak (Battlestar Galactica)
- Zak (TUGS), in the television series TUGS
- Zak Dingle, in the British soap opera Emmerdale
- Zak McKracken, hero of the adventure game Zak McKracken and the Alien Mindbenders
- Zak Saturday, one of the main characters in the cartoon series The Secret Saturdays
- Zak, in the Cbeebies television show (Zingzillas)
- Zakk, one of the protagonists of the film Deathgasm

== See also ==
- Zechariah (given name)
- Zachary
- Zack (given name)
- Zach (given name)
- Zac
