= Night of Zechariah =

Festival and cultural practice in Iraq

A meal tray prepared with candles on the Night of Zechariah.

The Night of Zechariah (Arabic: ليلة زكريا, romanized: Laylat Zakariyyā) is a festive occasion held in Iraq on the evening of the first Sunday of the Islamic month of Sha'ban. The event is held in honor of, and named after, the Abrahamic prophet Zechariah, father of John the Baptist. Two prophets venerated in Christianity, Islam, and Mandaeism. Due to this, the popular event is steeped in religious and cultural tradition marked by specific rituals such as serving food, lighting candles, and reciting prayers and religious hymns.

== Historical background ==
=== Prophet Zechariah ===
In Abrahamic lore, Zechariah was the priest of the second temple from the course of Abijah. While performing services in the temple, Zechariah received a vision from an angel that his aged wife, Elizabeth, that they will have a son named "John" who would be the forerunner of the Messiah. Tied to the prophet was the Song of Zechariah, also known as the Benedictus, which celebrates Zechariah's prophetic fulfillment and his son's birth. The story is also retold in the Qur'an and John is considered a reward for his father due to his righteousness.

=== Origins among Iraqis ===
Honorific Arabic calligraphy of Zechariah's name

Some Baghdadis believe the festive night dates back to the early days of Christianity in Iraq. The festive night is believed to have originated as an expression of joy over the delivery of children, blessings associated with Zechariah, the answering of his prayer, and the miraculous birth of John. The miracle affected women in Iraq who wished to have children, especially a son.

It has since become a cherished tradition in certain Muslim communities, particularly in Iraq, where the festive night is associated with it. Due to the association with the story, the festival is celebrated among the Abrahamic religions in Iraq, including Muslims, Christians, Jews, and Mandaeans. The latter venerate Zechariah for being the father of John the Baptist, the main prophet of Mandaeism. Despite the prayers for children, the rest of the practices have no mention in Islam and are thus cultural practices and traditions rather than purely religious.

== Traditions and practices ==
The festive night is celebrated during the first Sunday evening of the Islamic month of Sha'ban. Older marketplaces, such as the Shorja in Baghdad, become packed with people, especially unmarried women, who buy supplies and necessities for the celebration prior to the night.

On the occasion, relatives and neighbors gather, especially children who play drums, around the woman. The main symbolic hymn said on the night is "O' Zechariah, return to me every year and every year we set up a tray" or just "O' Zechariah, return to me." Candles are set up and lit up alongside a tray of sweets such as sesame seeds, Turkish delight, apricot paste, baklava, chickpeas, walnuts, almonds, and raisins.

== See also ==
- Culture of Iraq
- Eid Khidr Elias
- Zechariah in Islam
