= Zechariah Puoric Matuong =

Zechariah Puoric Matuong Biet is a South Sudanese politician. He was elected to the Lakes State Legislative Assembly in 2010.

In January 2010 he was named as the SPLM candidate for the Malek seat of the Lakes State Legislative Assembly by the SPLM Lakes State Electoral College Committee. He won the seat with 21,011 votes (95.64%).

In December 2011 the parliamentary immunity of Zechariah Puoric was lifted, following a request from the attorney general. In January 2012 he was convicted by the Rumbek county court to two year imprisonment for child abduction and a fine of £1,000 SSP and seven cows for adultery under Dinka customary law.

Zecharaiah Puoric argued that the charges had been politically motivated. He appealed the conviction to the Lakes State High Court of Appeal and was found not guilty on both charges. On October 1, 2012 the Lakes State Legislative Assembly voted to re-instate Zechariah Puoric.
