= Mirosław Żak =

Polish geodesist (1936–2025)

- Born: 10 September 1936; Katowice, Poland
- Died: 24 January 2025 (aged 88)
- Education: AGH University of Science and Technology
- Scientific career
- Fields: Geodesist

Mirosław Żak (10 September 1936 – 24 January 2025) was a Polish surveyor and academic. He was Professor of Technical Sciences, Professor of Agricultural University of Kraków (Head of the Department of Geodesy (1991), Head of the Department of Higher Geodesy (1992), and Head of the Department of Geodesy (2004–2006). Żak died on 24 January 2025, at the age of 88.
