= Zackary Leon Furst =

Australian chef

Zackary Leon Furst is an Australian chef based in Melbourne, Australia.

== Education ==
Furst was born and raised in Wodonga, Victoria, Australia. Furst studied at William Angliss Institute of TAFE. Furst attended Catholic College Wodonga. Furst also went to St. Augustine's Primary School.

== Career ==
In 2016, he is the sous chef at IDES. In 2019, Furst appointed as the head chef at Bar Liberty in Melbourne.

He spent two years at Ben Shewry's acclaimed Ripponlea restaurant, Attica. He worked at Beechworth's Provenance Restaurant before moving to Melbourne and training in French cuisine under chef Gabriel Martin.

== Awards ==
- The Good Food Guide Young Chef of the Year Award 2022
- Time Out magazine’s Hot Talent Award in 2018
- Electrolux Young Chef of the Year Awards – Finalist
- San Pellegrino Best Young Chef 2017 – Finalist
- National Golden Chef’s Hat Award 2014 (National) – Victorian title

== Personal life ==
Furst was exposed to the food industry because his parents, Ted and Jacinta, were managing a catering company. As early as 10 years old, Zackary helped in the family business together with his four siblings.
