= Żak =

Family name

Żak (pronounced like French Jacques) is a Polish family name.

- Mirosław Żak (1936–2025), Polish geodesist and academic
- Szymon Żak (1507–1591), Polish Calvinist pastor
- Zygmunt Solorz-Żak (born 1956), Polish businessman

== In the Polish wikipedia ==
- pl:Maciej Żak (1962) Polish film director
- pl:Cezary Żak (1961) Polish actor
- pl:Stanisław Żak (1932) Polski literature scholar
- pl:Piotr Żak (1957) Polish politician and bridge player
- pl:Adam Żak (1950) Polski Jezuit philosopher
- pl:Czesław Żak (1895–1959) Polish composer
