= Zach (surname) =

Zach is a German and Czech surname. Notable people with the name include:

- Anton von Zach (1747–1826), Austrian general
- Erwin von Zach (1872–1942), Austrian diplomat and sinologist
- Franz Xaver von Zach (1754–1832), Austrian astronomer
- Alexander Zach (born 1976), Austrian politician
- František Zach (1807–1892), Czech-born soldier, military theorist and freedom fighter
- Hilde Zach (1942–2011), first woman mayor of Innsbruck, Austria
- Jan Zach (1699–1773), Czech composer, violinist and organist
- Michal Zach (born 1969), Czech football manager
- Nathan Zach (1930–2020), Israeli poet

== See also ==
- Zack (disambiguation)
- Izak (disambiguation)
- Zacha
- Guido A. Zäch (1935–2026), Swiss politician
