= Curtius (crater) =

Lunar surface depression

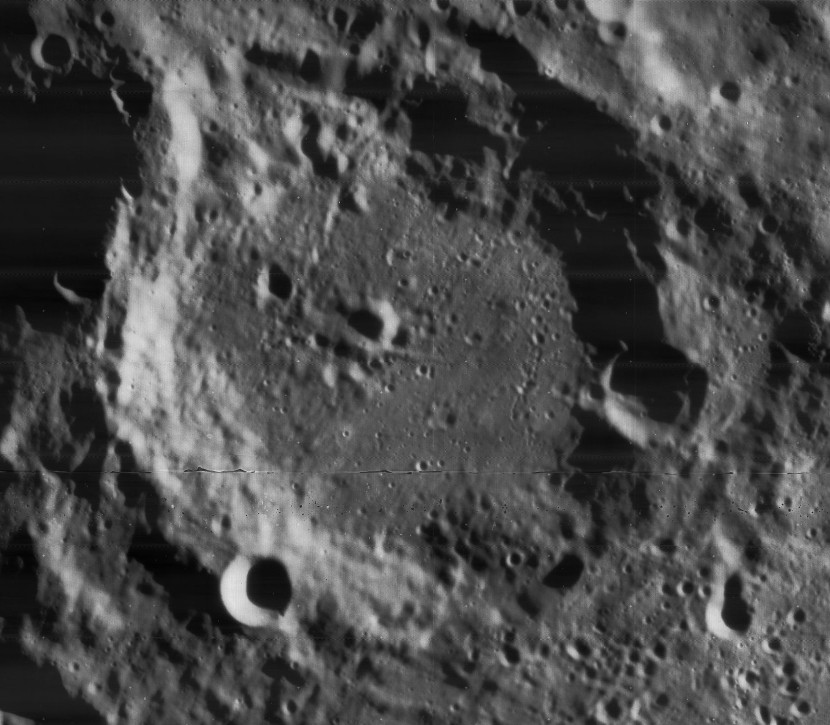
- Lunar Orbiter 4 image.
- Coordinates: 67.2°S 4.4°E
- Diameter: 99.29 km (61.70 mi)
- Depth: 3.99 km (2.48 mi)
- Colongitude: 356° at sunrise
- Formation: Nectarian
- Eponym: Albert Curtz

Curtius is a lunar impact crater that is located in the southern highlands of the Moon. From the Earth the crater appears foreshortened, making it more difficult to observe detail. Nevertheless, this is a large crater that can be readily found in even small telescopes. British astronomer T. W. Webb noted it "has a very complex and unusually steep wall". Curtius is located within one crater diameter of the still-larger Moretus to the southwest. To the northeast is the smaller Pentland. Curtius is 99 kilometers in diameter and 4 kilometers deep.

This crater is named after German astronomer Albert Curtz (1600–1671). His name was introduced as "Curtius Soc. I" in the lunar nomenclature of the Italian astronomer Giovanni B. Riccioli in 1651. Its modern designation was formally adopted by the International Astronomical Union in 1935.

== Description ==
On the lunar geologic timescale, Curtius dates from the Nectarian period, 3.92 to 3.85 billion years ago. The outer rim of Curtius has been softened due to impact erosion, but it retains much of its original structure. Along the north and northwest parts of the rim are a pair of notable outward bulges that ruin the overall symmetry of the crater. There is a small satellite crater, Curtius E, lying across the eastern rim, and a small, bowl-shaped craterlet Curtius A along the southern rim.

The interior floor is relatively level, with a low, rounded central peak near the midpoint. The northern part of the inner wall has extended further into the crater floor than elsewhere, producing a slightly irregular surface. The floor is covered by a number of tiny craterlets, but there are no other impacts of note across the interior.

In 2023, the SOFIA airborne infrared telescope detected the signature for a relatively high concentration of water along a "wet ridge" just to the north of Curtius crater.

== Satellite craters ==
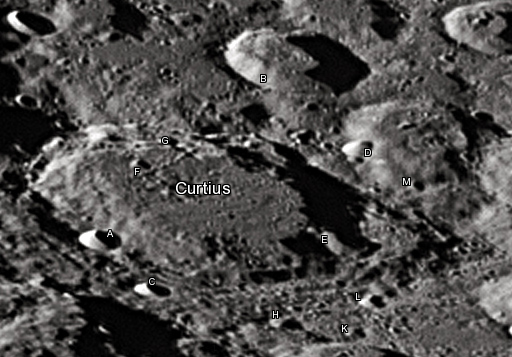
Image of Curtius from Earth showing the satellite features

By convention these features are identified on lunar maps by placing the letter on the side of the crater midpoint that is closest to Curtius.

Curtius	Latitude	Longitude	Diameter
A	68.5° S	2.7° E	12 km
B	63.7° S	4.7° E	41 km
C	69.2° S	4.4° E	10 km
D	64.8° S	8.1° E	61 km
E	67.2° S	8.2° E	15 km
F	66.5° S	2.7° E	6 km
G	65.9° S	3.1° E	6 km
H	69.4° S	8.2° E	10 km
K	69.1° S	9.8° E	6 km
L	68.2° S	9.4° E	7 km
M	65.5° S	8.6° E	5 km
