= Zacharie =

Zacharie is both a masculine French given name and a surname. Notable people with the same name include:

== Given name ==
- Zacharie Allemand (1762–1828), French admiral
- Zacharie Astruc (1833–1907), French sculptor, painter, poet, and art critic
- Zacharie Boucher (born 1992), French footballer
- Zacharie Cloutier (c. 1590 – 1677), French carpenter and colonist
- Zacharie Dupuy (died 1676 or 1610–1676), French soldier
- Zacharie Elenga, Congolese musician
- Zacharie Gahutu (born 1950), Burundian diplomat
- Zacharie Heince (1611–1669), French painter and engraver
- Zacharie Jacob (died 1667), French actor and playwright
- Zacharie Myboto (born 1938), Gabonese politician
- Zacharie Noah (1937–2017), Cameroonian footballer
- Zacharie Noterman (1820–1890), Belgian painter and printmaker
- Zacharie Perevet (born 1957), Cameroonian politician

== Surname ==
- Nicolaus Zacharie (died 1466), Italian Renaissance composer
- Rosa Zacharie, Canadian actress

== Fictional characters ==
- Zacharie, a character from the role-playing video game Off

== See also ==
- Saint-Zacharie, a French commune
- Zachary
