= Žák =

Žák (feminine Žáková) is a Czech surname meaning 'pupil', 'disciple'. Notable people with the surname include:

- Hana Žáková, Czech rower
- Ladislav Žák (1900–1973), Czech architect
- Robert Žák (born 1966), Czech football player and manager
- Václav Žák (1945–2025), Czech politician
