= Zachary =

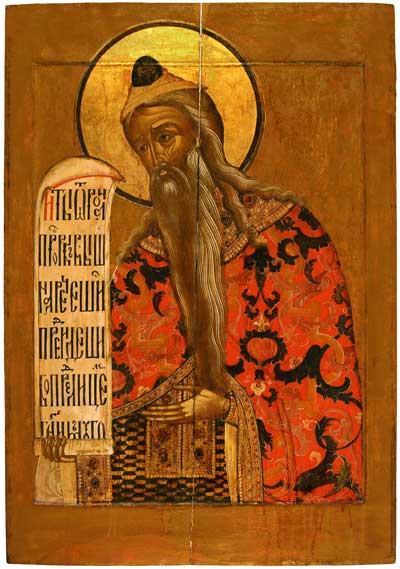
- Icon of Prophet Zachary (Zechariah)
- Pronunciation: /ˈzækəri/
- Gender: Male
- Language: English

Origin
- Meaning: Remembered by God
- Region of origin: Ancient Israel

Other names
- Alternative spelling: Zackary, Zacary, Zakary, Zakkary
- Variant forms: Zechariah, Zakariya
- Nicknames: Zack, Zach, Zak, Zac

Zachary is a male given name, a variant of Zechariah – the name of several biblical characters.

== People ==
- Pope Zachary (679–752), pope of the Catholic Church from 741 to 752
- Zachary of Vienne (died 106), bishop of Vienne (France), martyr and Roman Catholic saint
- Zachary Abel (born 1980), American actor
- Zachary Aston-Reese (born 1994), American ice hockey player
- Zachary Babington (1690–1745), High Sheriff of Staffordshire and barrister
- Zak Bagans (born 1977), American television host, author, documentary filmmaker and paranormal investigator
- Zachary James Baker, stage name Zacky Vengeance, rhythm guitarist for American rock band Avenged Sevenfold
- Zachary Bayly (military officer) (1841–1916), South African colonial military commander
- Zachary Bayly (planter) (1721–1769), planter and politician in Jamaica
- Zachary Bell (born 1982), Canadian racing cyclist
- Zachary Bennett (born 1980), Canadian actor and musician
- Zachary Blount (born 1977), American biologist
- Zachary Borovay, multi-media designer
- Zachary Boyd (1585–1653), Scottish religious writer
- Zachary Braiterman, American philosopher
- Zachary Brault-Guillard (born 1998), Canadian soccer player
- Zachary Breaux (1960–1997), American jazz guitarist
- Zachary Breganski, Canadian soccer player
- Zachary Brooke (theologian) (1716–1788), English clergyman and academic
- Zachary Brooke (historian) (1883–1946), British medieval historian and writer
- Zachary Browne (born 1985), American actor
- Zachary Bruenger (born 1990), American stock car racing driver
- Zachery Ty Bryan (born 1981), American actor
- Zachary Burns (born 1996), American rower
- Zachary Cairncross (born 1989), Australian footballer
- Zachary Carrettin (born 1972), American musician, conductor, and music educator
- Zachary Carter (born 1999), American football player
- Zachary Catazaro (born 1989), American ballet dancer
- Zachary Adam Chesser (born 1989), American convert to Islam who pleaded guilty to aiding a terrorist organization
- Zachary Clay (born 1995), Canadian artistic gymnast
- Zachary Cooke-Collis (1754–1834), Irish archdeacon
- Zachary Cradock (1633–1695)
- Zachary Taylor Davis (1872–1946), American architect
- Zachary DeVille (born 1993), Guamanian footballer
- Zachary Donohue (born 1991), American ice dancer
- Zac Efron (born 1987), American actor and singer
- Zachary Fisher (1910–1999), Jewish American philanthropist and real estate developer
- Zachary Gordon (born 1998), American actor
- Zachary Gramlich, American politician
- Zachary Gray, a member of the Canadian indie rock band The Zolas
- Zack Hample (born 1977), Major League baseball collector
- Zac Hanson (born 1985), American musician, member of band Hanson
- Zachary Harvey, American politician
- Zachary "Zach" Hyman (born 1992), Canadian NHL ice hockey player
- Zachary D. Kaufman (born 1979), professor
- Zachary Knighton (born 1978), American actor
- Zachary Lansdowne (1888–1925), US Navy officer and early naval aviator
- Zachary Lemnios (born 1954), American scientist, inventor and former US government Assistant Secretary of Defense for Research and Engineering
- Zachary Levi (born 1980), American actor, director, and singer
- Zachary Alakaʻi Lum, Kānaka Maoli musician, composer, and hula dancer
- Zachary Macaulay (1768–1838), Scottish abolitionist
- Zachary "Zack" Merrick, (born 1988), bassist for All Time Low
- Zachary Mudge (1770–1852), British Royal Navy admiral
- Zachary Pearce (1690–1774), Anglican bishop and writer
- Zachary Quinto (born 1977), American actor and producer
- Zachary Smith Reynolds (1911–1932), American amateur aviator and youngest child of R. J. Reynolds, founder of the R. J. Reynolds Tobacco Company
- Zachary Rhyner (born 1986), U.S. Air Force Combat Controller and Air Force Cross recipient
- Zachary Richard (born 1950), American Cajun singer-songwriter and poet
- Zachary Root (born 2004), American baseball player
- Zachary Scott (1914–1965), American actor
- Zachary Cole Smith (born 1984), singer and frontman of DIIV
- Zachary T. Space (born 1961), American lawyer and politician
- Zachary Stevens (born 1966), American heavy metal and rock singer
- Zachary Swain (born 1977), American drummer
- Zachary Taylor (1784–1850), 12th President of the United States and US Army major general
- Zachary Taylor (Tennessee politician) (1849–1921), U.S. Representative from Tennessee
- Zachary Taylor (baseball) (1850–1917), American first baseman in the National Association for the 1874 Baltimore Canaries
- Zachary Test (born 1989), American rugby union player
- Zachary Turner (2002–2003), one-year-old murdered by his mother
- Zachary "Zack" Weiss (born 1992), American Major League Baseball player
- Zachary Wirth, American politician
- Zachary Wohlman (1988–2021), American boxer
- Zachary Wyatt (born 1984), former member of the Missouri House of Representatives and only openly gay American Republican legislator
- Zachary Zulock (born 1987), American child rapist

== Characters ==
- Zachary Hale Comstock, primary antagonist of the video game BioShock Infinite
- Zachary "Zach" Dempsey, a character in the novel and Netflix series 13 Reasons Why
- Zachary "Owl Man" Dowling in the Zom-B novel series
- Zachary Gray in the young adult novels of Madeleine L'Engle
- Zackary Marker, the Cardcaptors name for the Cardcaptor Sakura character Takashi Yamazaki, voiced by Andrew Francis
- Zachary "Zack" Morris in the sitcoms Good Morning, Miss Bliss and the Saved by the Bell series
- Dr. Zachary Smith in the 1960s TV show Lost in Space
- Zachary "Zack" Taylor in the Power Rangers universe
- Zachary Zatara in the DC Comics universe

== See also ==
- Zacharie
- Zachery
- Zechariah (given name)
- Zack (personal name)
- Zak (given name)
- Zackary
