= List of Catholic clergy scientists =

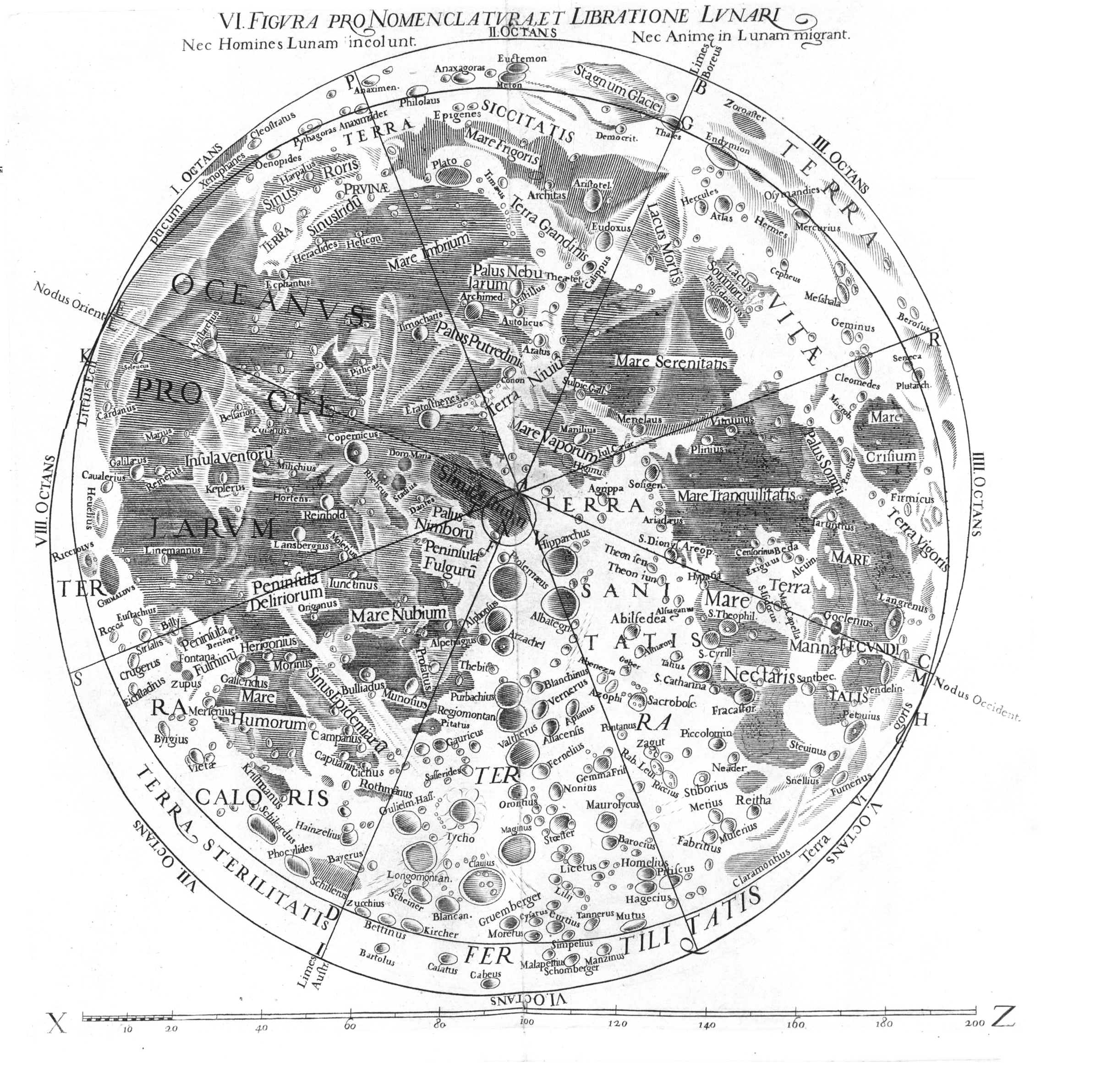
Selenograph (map of the Moon) from Fr. Giovanni Battista Riccioli's Almagestum (1651)

This is a list of Catholic clergy (Note: This list includes bishops (including popes), priests, deacons, and those who received minor orders in the Church at times when the minor orders were considered clergy.) throughout history who have made contributions to science. These churchmen-scientists include Nicolaus Copernicus, Gregor Mendel, Georges Lemaître, Albertus Magnus, Roger Bacon, Pierre Gassendi, Roger Joseph Boscovich, Marin Mersenne, Bernard Bolzano, Francesco Maria Grimaldi, Nicole Oresme, Jean Buridan, Robert Grosseteste, Christopher Clavius, Nicolas Steno, Athanasius Kircher, Giovanni Battista Riccioli, and William of Ockham. The Catholic Church has also produced many lay scientists and mathematicians.

The Jesuits in particular have made numerous significant contributions to the development of science. For example, the Jesuits have dedicated significant study to earthquakes, and seismology has been described as "the Jesuit science." The Jesuits have been described as "the single most important contributor to experimental physics in the seventeenth century." According to Jonathan Wright in his book God's Soldiers, by the eighteenth century the Jesuits had "contributed to the development of pendulum clocks, pantographs, barometers, reflecting telescopes and microscopes, to scientific fields as various as magnetism, optics and electricity. They observed, in some cases before anyone else, the colored bands on Jupiter's surface, the Andromeda Nebula and Saturn's rings. They theorized about the circulation of the blood (independently of Harvey), the theoretical possibility of flight, the way the moon affected the tides, and the wave-like nature of light."

Because there is a List of lay Catholic scientists, this list does not include lay members of religious orders, such as ordinary monks and nuns, brothers and sisters, or anyone in minor orders at such times that those were not considered clergy.

== List ==
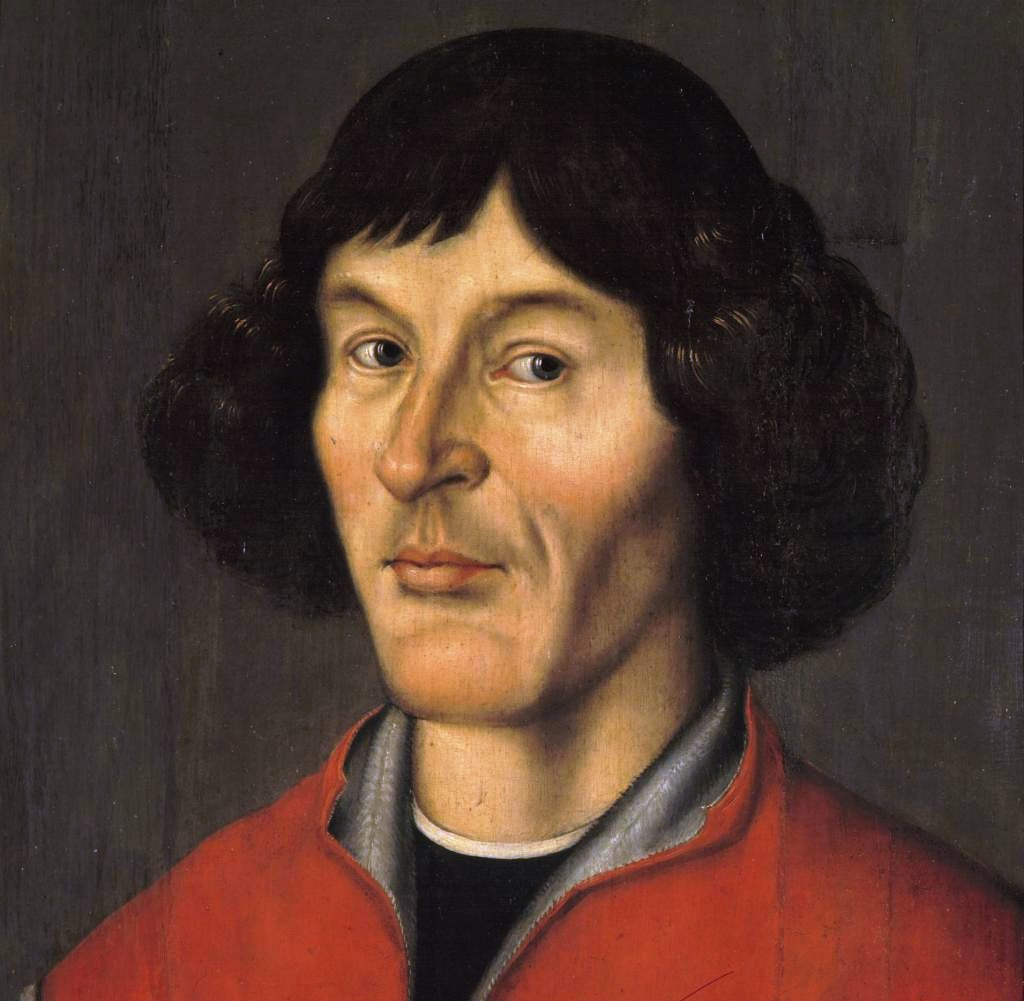
Nicolaus Copernicus

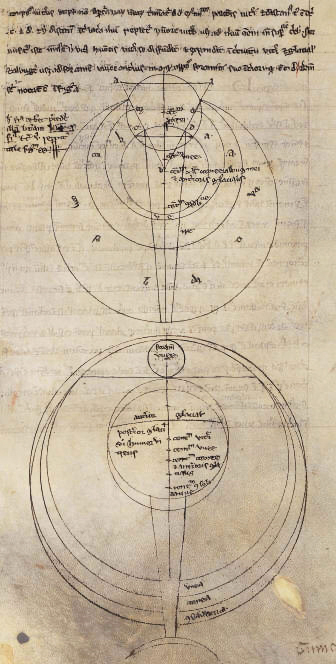
Roger Bacon's circular diagrams relating to the scientific study of optics

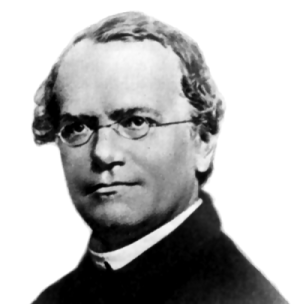
Gregor Mendel, Augustinian friar and geneticist

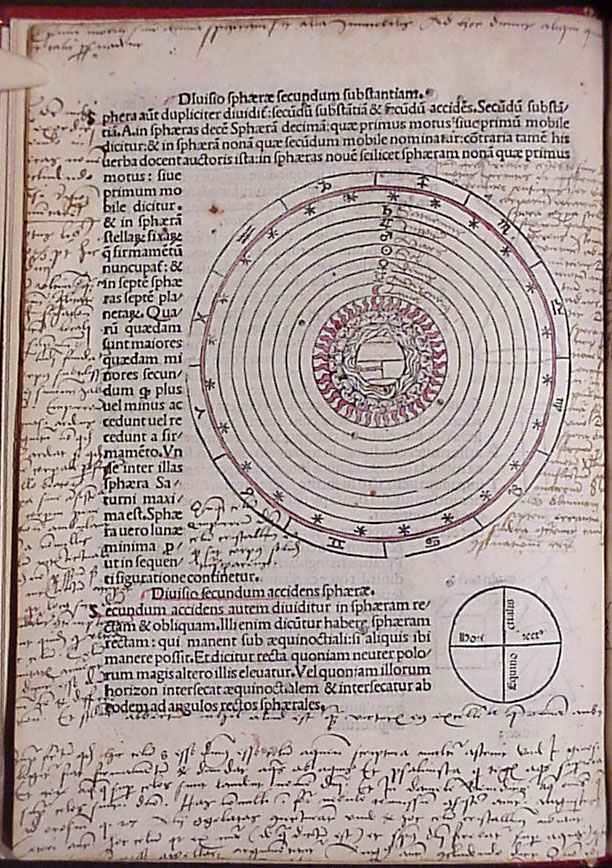
Sacrobosco's De sphaera mundi

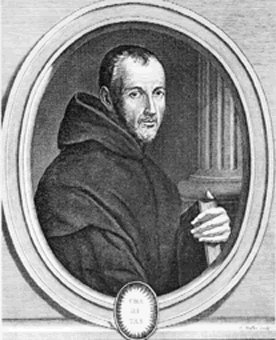
Marin Mersenne

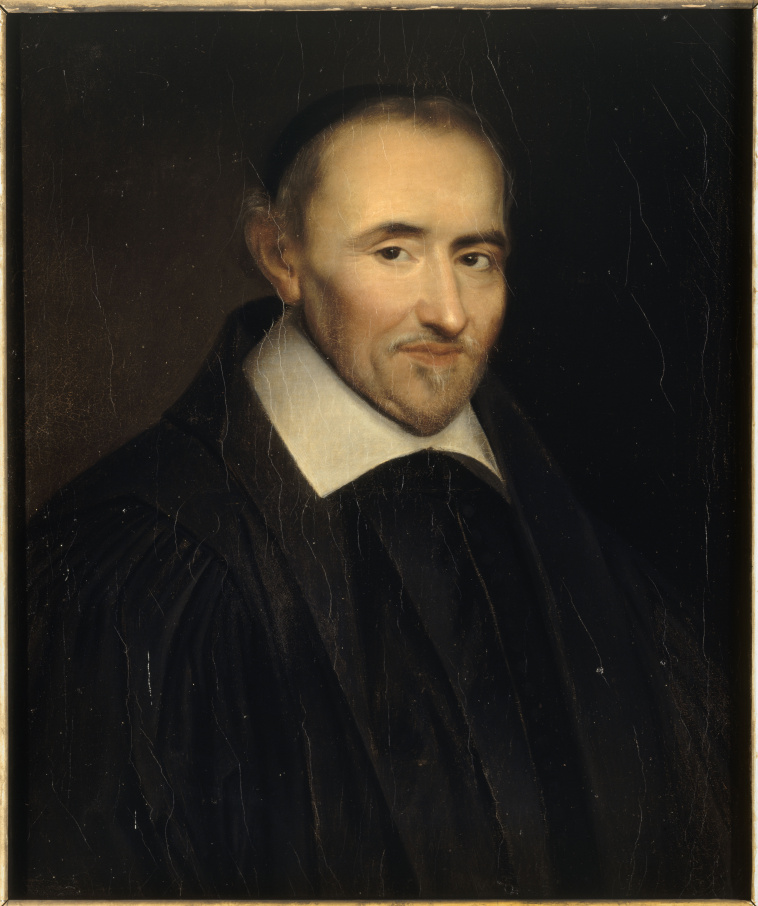
Pierre Gassendi

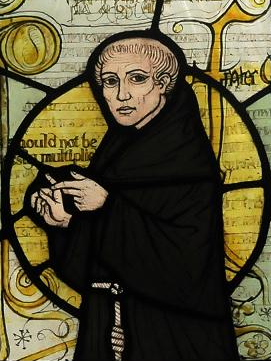
William of Ockham

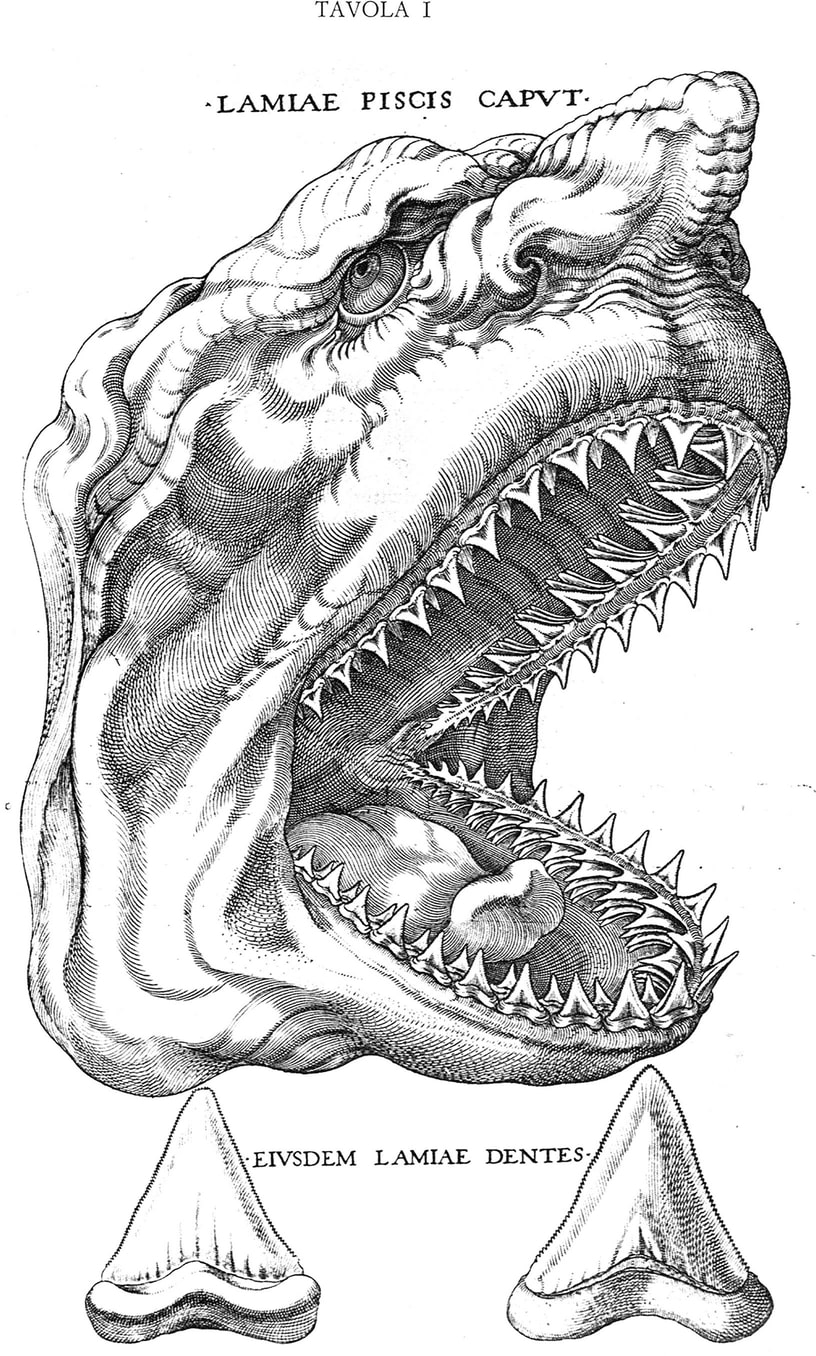
Illustration from Nicolas Steno's 1667 paper comparing the teeth of a shark head with a fossil tooth

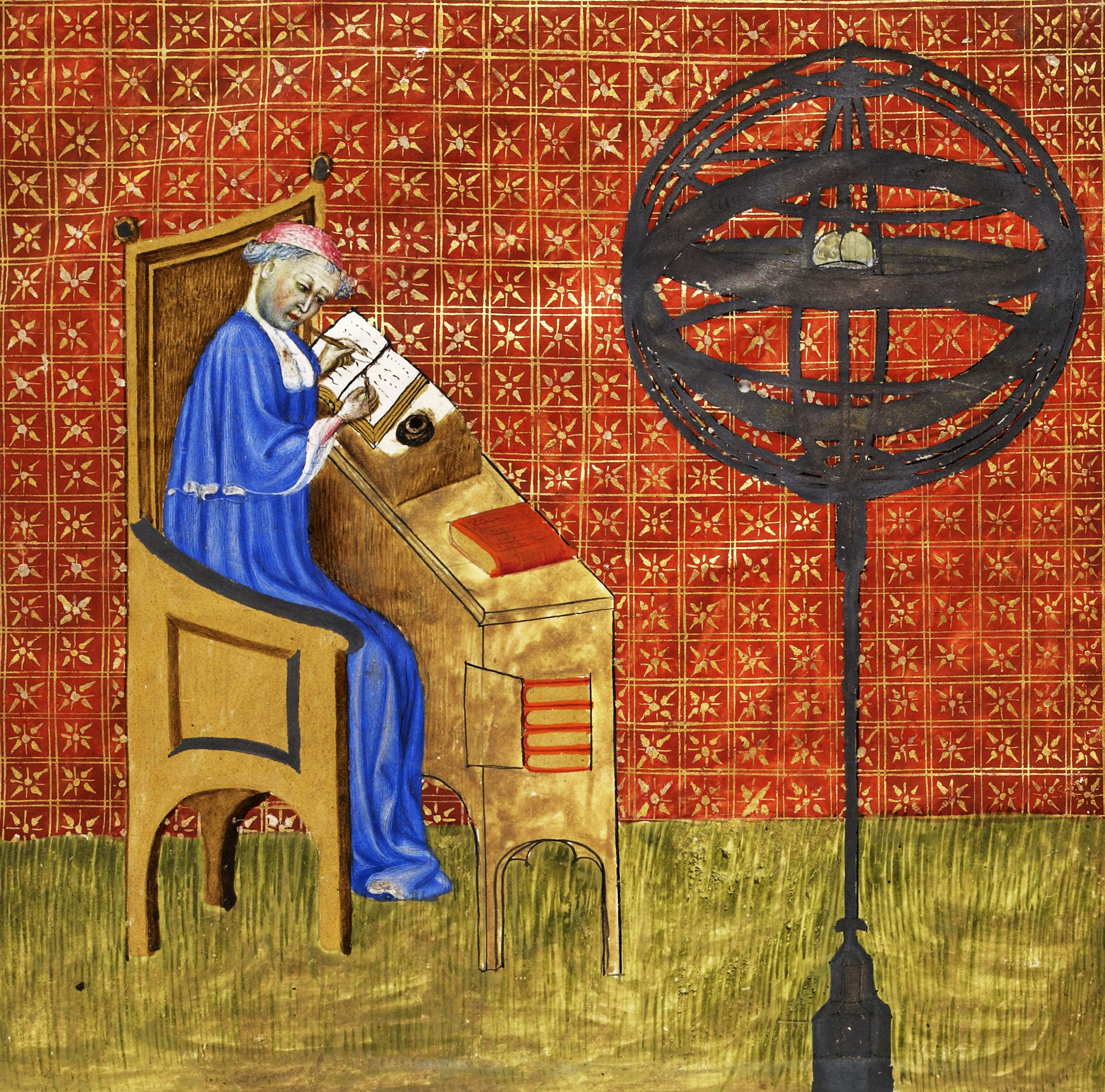
Nicole Oresme

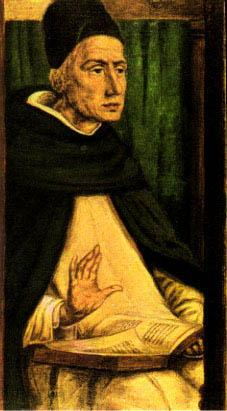
Albertus Magnus

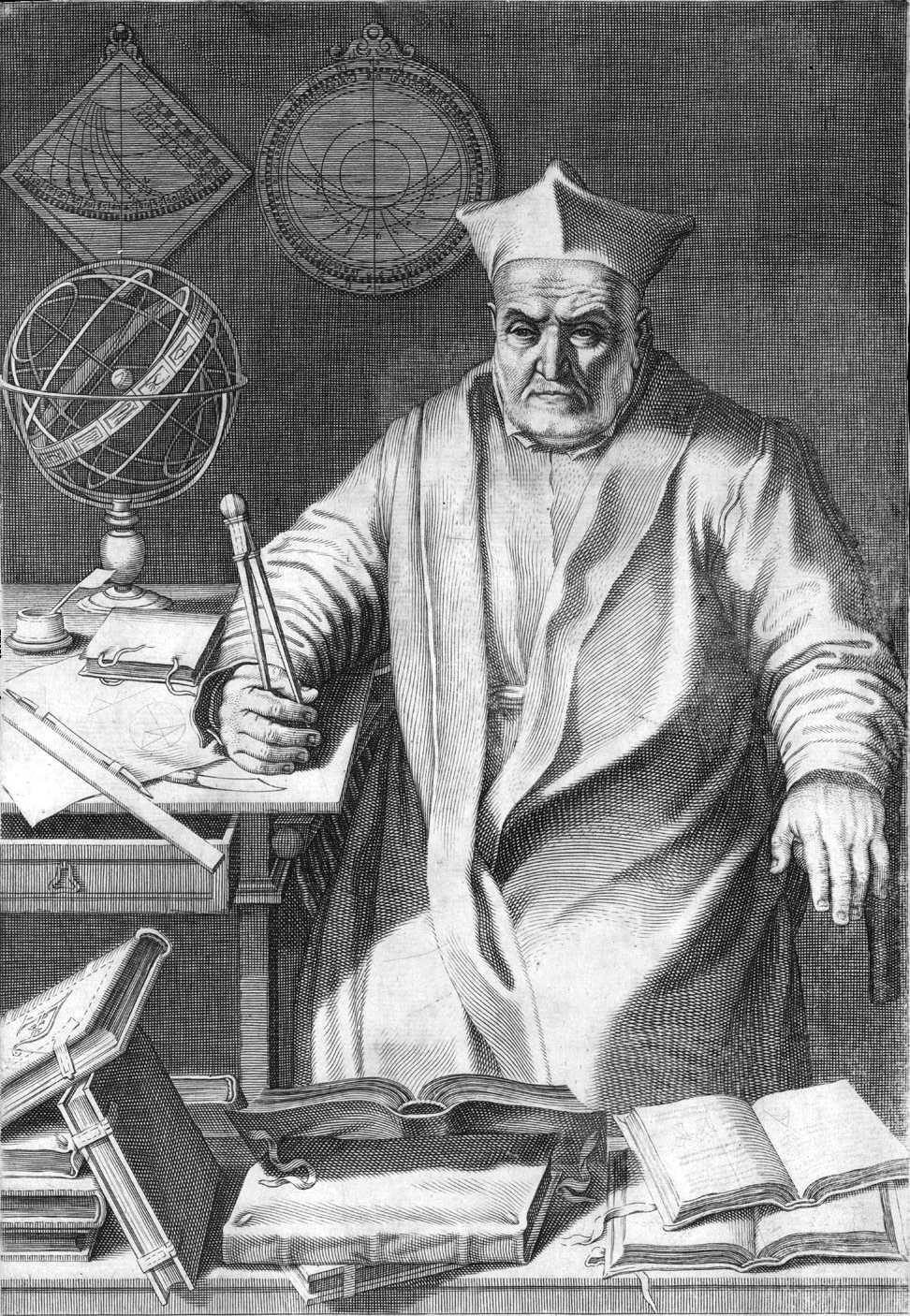
Christopher Clavius

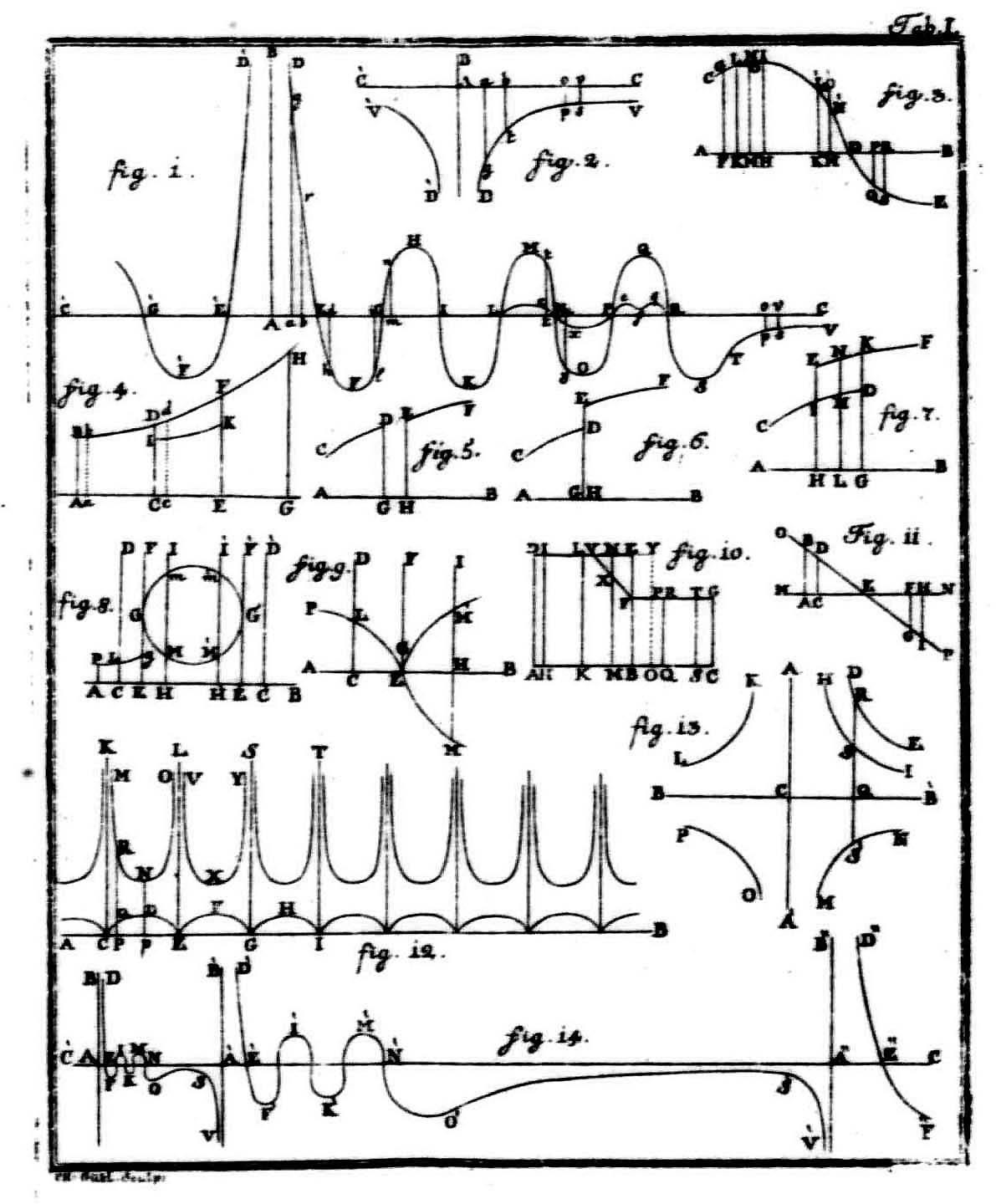
First page of Boscovich's Theoria Philosophiæ Naturalis

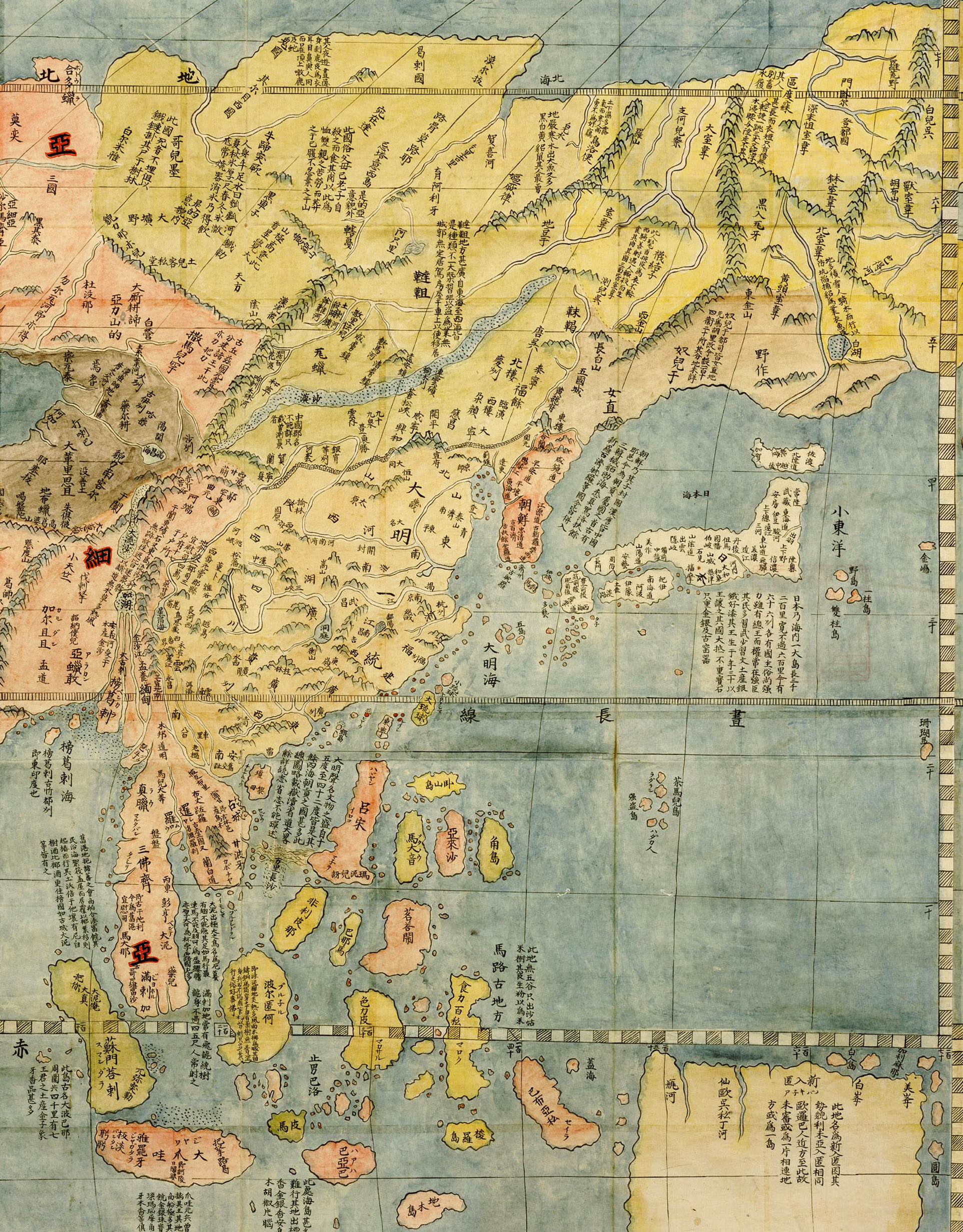
Map of the Far East by Matteo Ricci in 1602

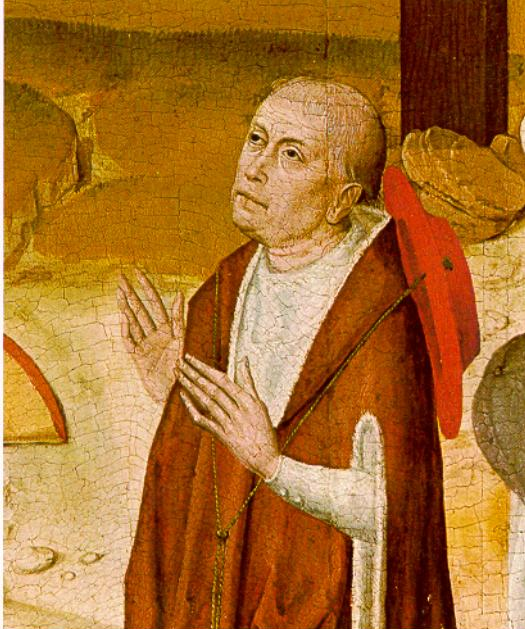
Nicolas of Cusa

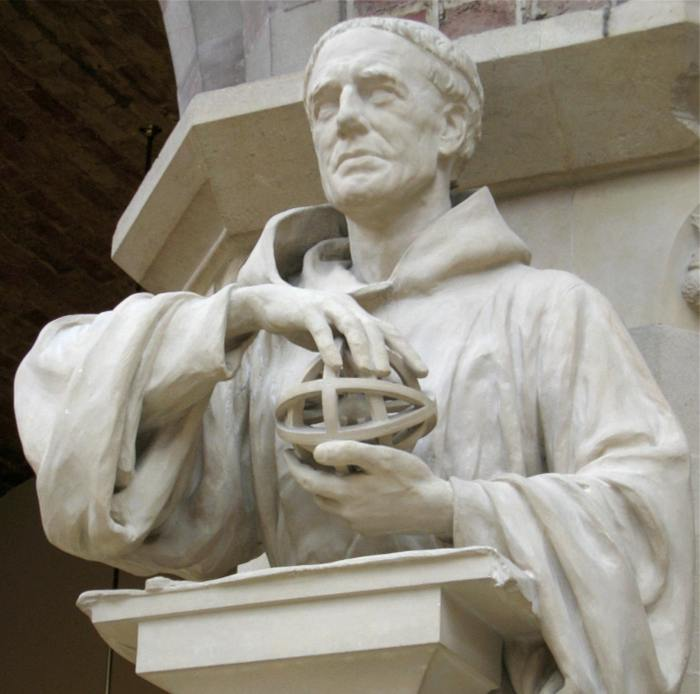
Statue of Roger Bacon in the Oxford University Museum

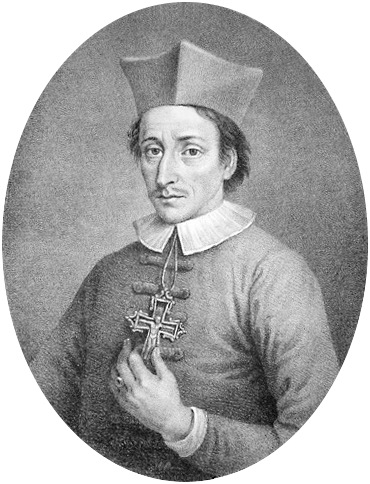
Nicolas Steno

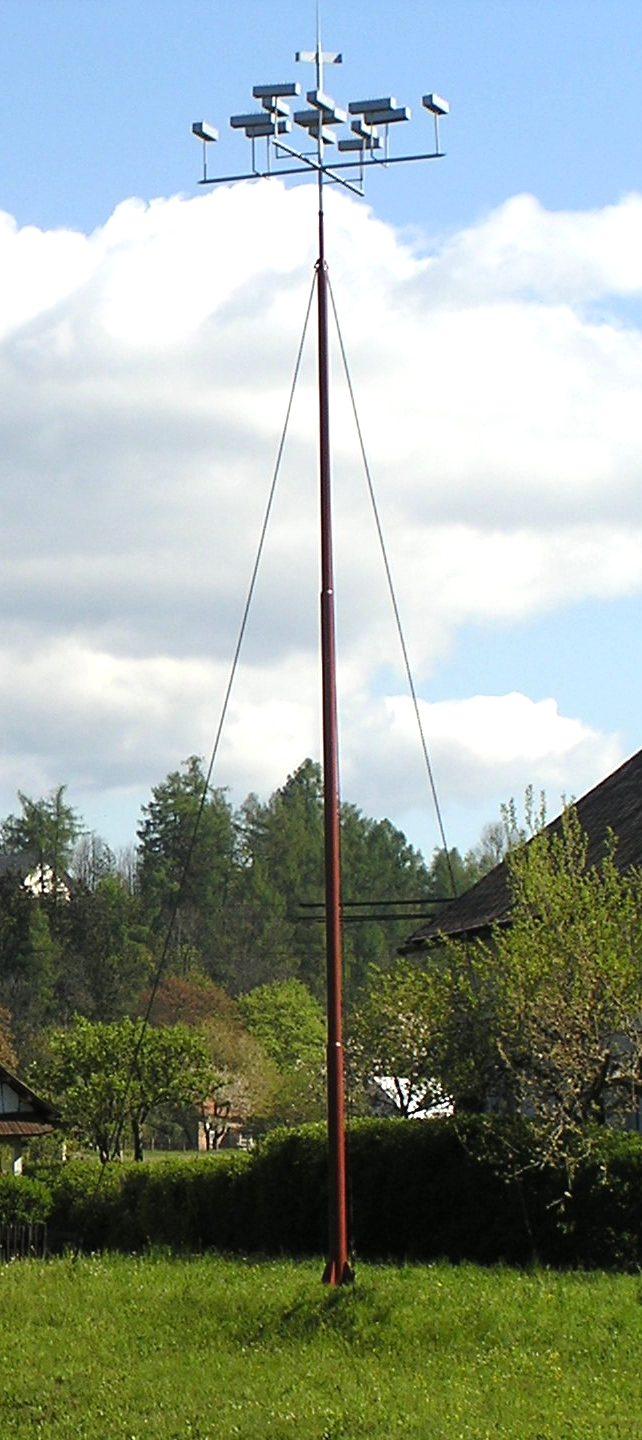
The machina meteorologic, invented by Václav Prokop Diviš, worked like a lightning rod

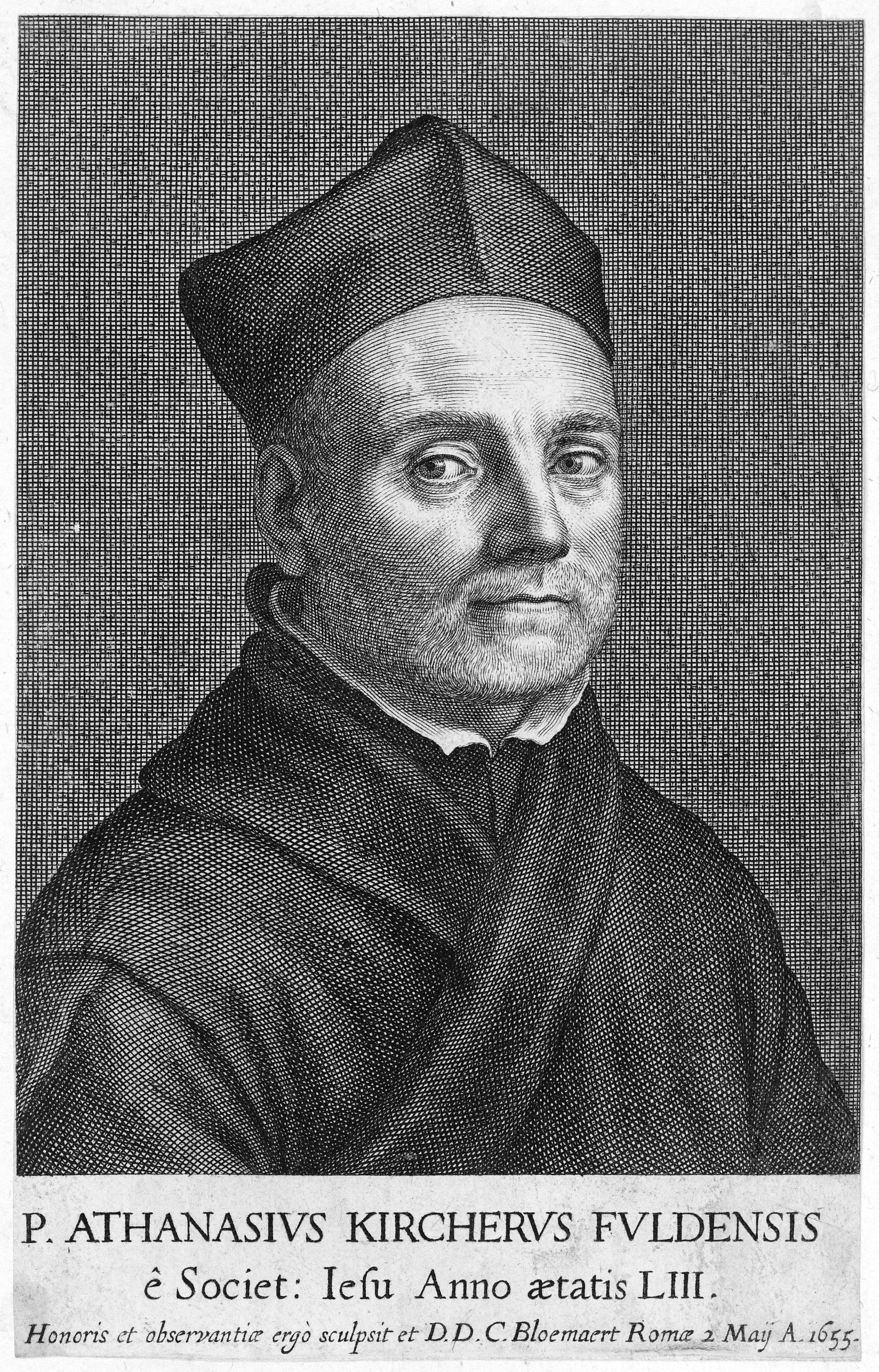
Athanasius Kircher

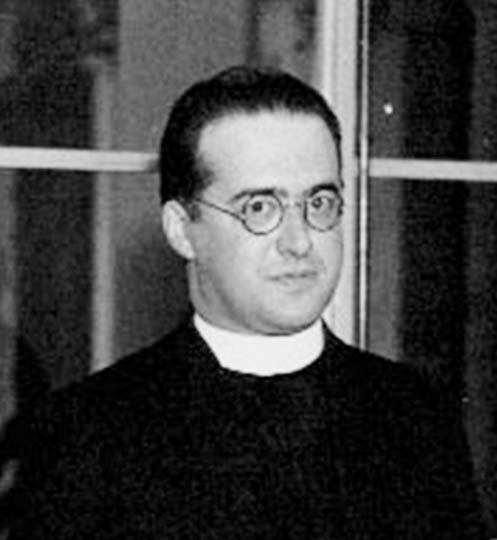
Georges Lemaître

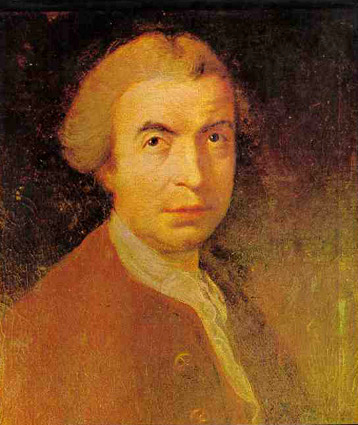
Roger Boscovich

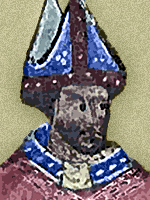
Robert Grosseteste

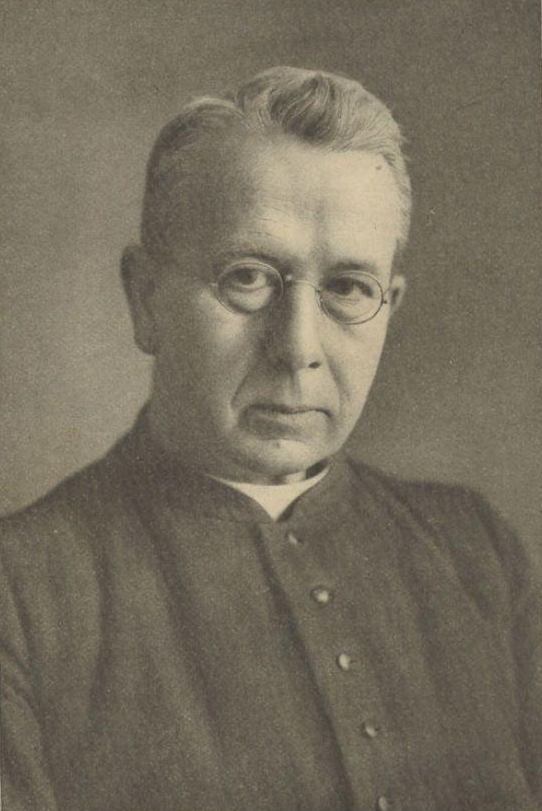
Johan Stein

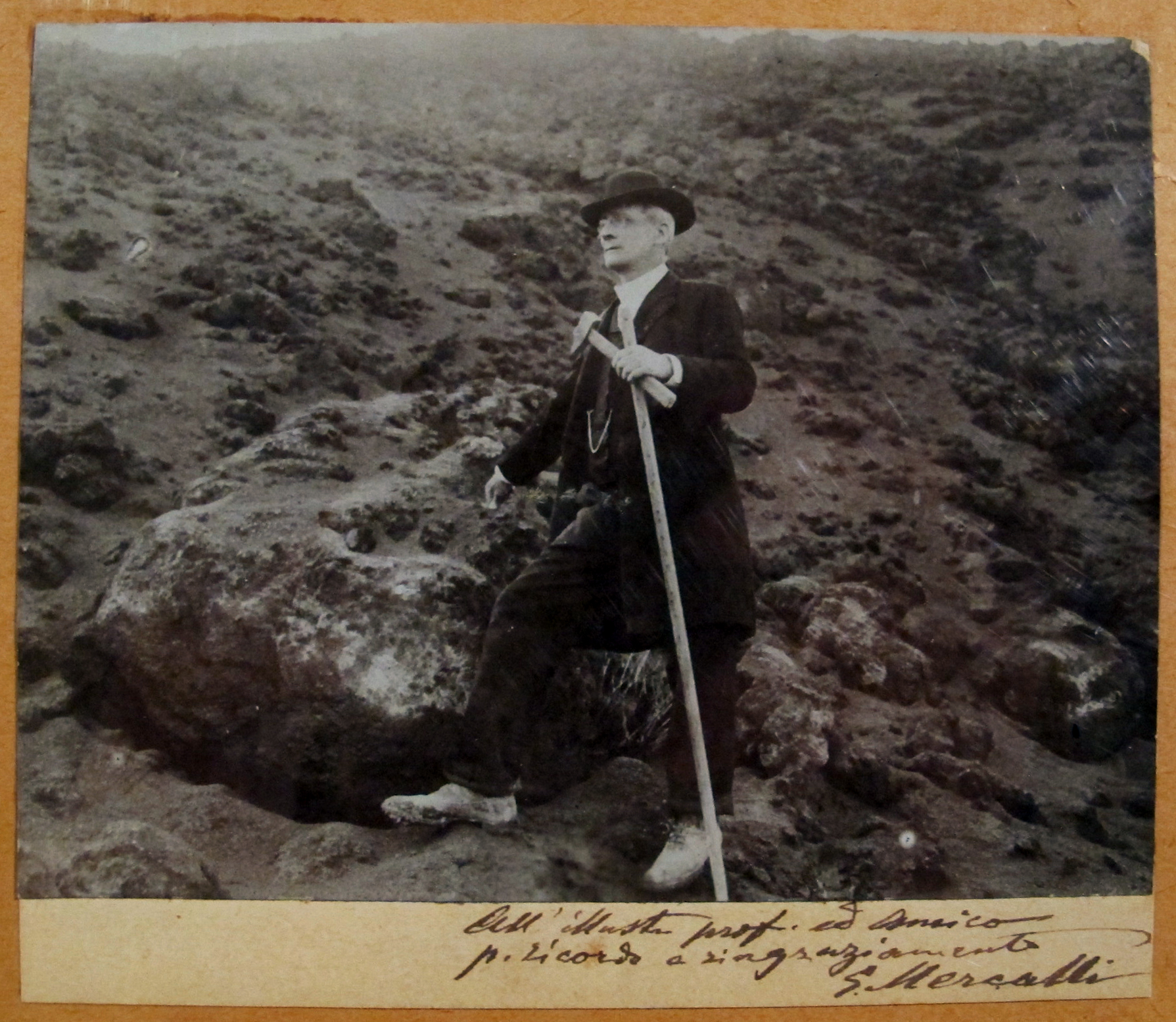
Giuseppe Mercalli

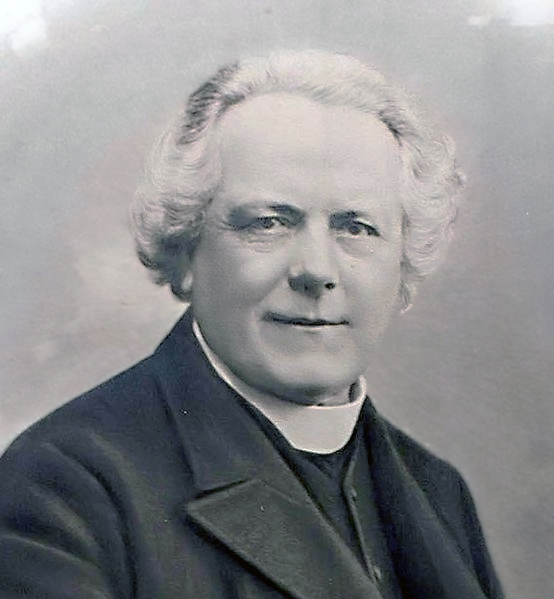
Antonio Stoppani

=== A ===
- José de Acosta (1539–1600) – Jesuit missionary and naturalist who wrote one of the first detailed and realistic descriptions of the new world
- François d'Aguilon (1567–1617) – Belgian Jesuit mathematician, architect, and physicist, who worked on optics
- Lorenzo Albacete (1941–2014) – priest, physicist, and theologian
- Albert of Castile (c. 1460 – 1522) – Dominican priest and historian
- Albert of Saxony (philosopher) (c. 1320 – 1390) – German bishop known for his contributions to logic and physics; with Buridan he helped develop the theory that was a precursor to the modern theory of inertia
- Albertus Magnus (c. 1206 – 1280) – Dominican friar and Bishop of Regensburg who has been described as "one of the most famous precursors of modern science in the High Middle Ages." Patron saint of natural sciences; Works in physics, logic, metaphysics, biology, and psychology.
- Giulio Alenio (1582–1649) – Jesuit theologian, astronomer and mathematician; was sent to the Far East as a missionary and adopted a Chinese name and customs; wrote 25 books, including a cosmography and a Life of Jesus in Chinese.
- José María Algué (1856–1930) – priest and meteorologist who invented the barocyclonometer
- Bartolomé de Alva (c. 1597 – after 1640) mestizo (Spanish-Náhuatl) Mexican priest, scholar of the Náhuatl language, author of religious books in Náhuatl and translations of Spanish plays into Náhuatl
- José Antonio de Alzate y Ramírez (1737–1799) – priest, scientist, historian, cartographer, and meteorologist who wrote more than thirty treatises on a variety of scientific subjects
- Bartholomeus Amicus (1562–1649) – Jesuit who wrote about include Aristotelian philosophy, mathematics, astronomy, and the concept of vacuum and its relationship with God
- Stefano degli Angeli (1623–1697) – Jesuate (not to be confused with Jesuit), philosopher and mathematician, known for his work on the precursors of infinitesimal calculus
- Pierre Ango (1640–1694) – Jesuit scientist who published a book on optics
- Francesco Castracane degli Antelminelli (1817–1899) – priest and botanist who was one of the first to introduce microphotography into the study of biology
- Giovanni Antonelli (1818–1872) – priest and astronomer who served as director of the Ximenian Observatory of Florence
- Nicolò Arrighetti (1709–1767) – Jesuit who wrote treatises on light, heat, and electricity
- Mariano Artigas (1938–2006) – Spanish physicist, philosopher and theologian
- Giuseppe Asclepi (1706–1776) – Jesuit astronomer and physician who served as director of the Collegio Romano observatory; the lunar crater Asclepi is named after him
- Nicanor Austriaco – Dominican microbiologist, associate professor of biology and professor of theology at Providence College as well as chief researcher at the Austriaco Laboratory

=== B ===
- Roger Bacon (c. 1214 – 1294) – Franciscan friar who made significant contributions to mathematics and optics and has been described as a forerunner of modern scientific method
- Bernardino Baldi (1533–1617) – abbot, mathematician, and writer
- Eugenio Barsanti (1821–1864) – Piarist, possible inventor of the internal combustion engine
- Daniello Bartoli (1608–1685) – Bartoli and fellow Jesuit astronomer Niccolò Zucchi are credited as probably having been the first to see the equatorial belts on the planet Jupiter
- Joseph Bayma (1816–1892) – Jesuit known for work in stereochemistry and mathematics
- Giovanni Battista Beccaria (1716–1781) – Piarist, physicist, teacher of Joseph-Louis Lagrange, Luigi Galvani and Alessandro Volta, correspondent of Benjamin Franklin
- Giacopo Belgrado (1704–1789) – Jesuit professor of mathematics and physics and court mathematician who did experimental work in electricity
- Johann Adam Schall von Bell (1591 – 1666) – Jesuit astronomer, instrument maker and missionary in China
- Michel Benoist (1715–1774) – missionary to China and scientist
- Constanzo Beschi (1680–1747) – Jesuit missionary to South India, compiler of several Tamil lexicons, dictionaries and grammars, first European scholar of Tamil, Tamil poet (under the Tamil name of Vīramāmunivar)
- Mario Bettinus (1582–1657) – Jesuit philosopher, mathematician and astronomer; lunar crater Bettinus named after him
- Giuseppe Biancani (1566–1624) – Jesuit astronomer, mathematician, and selenographer, after whom the crater Blancanus on the Moon is named
- Jacques de Billy (1602–1679) – Jesuit who has produced a number of results in number theory which have been named after him; published several astronomical tables; the crater Billy on the Moon is named after him
- Paolo Boccone (1633–1704) – Cistercian botanist who contributed to the fields of medicine and toxicology
- Bernard Bolzano (1781–1848) – priest, mathematician, and logician whose other interests included metaphysics, ideas, sensation, and truth
- Anselmus de Boodt (1550–1632) – canon who was one of the founders of mineralogy
- Theodoric Borgognoni (1205–1298) – Dominican friar, Bishop of Cervia, and medieval Surgeon who made important contributions to antiseptic practice and anaesthetics
- Thomas Borgmeier (1892–1975) – German-born priest and entomologist who worked in Brazil
- Christopher Borrus (1583–1632) – Jesuit mathematician and astronomer who made observations on the magnetic variation of the compass
- Roger Joseph Boscovich (1711–1787) – Jesuit polymath known for his contributions to modern atomic theory and astronomy and for devising perhaps the first geometric procedure for determining the equator of a rotating planet from three observations of a surface feature and for computing the orbit of a planet from three observations of its position
- Joachim Bouvet (1656–1730) – Jesuit sinologist and cartographer who did his work in China
- Michał Boym (c. 1612 – 1659) – Jesuit who was one of the first westerners to travel within mainland China, and the author of numerous works on Asian fauna, flora and geography
- Thomas Bradwardine (c. 1290 – 1349) – Archbishop of Canterbury and mathematician who helped develop the mean speed theorem; one of the Oxford Calculators
- Martin Stanislaus Brennan (1845–1927) – priest and astronomer who wrote several books about science
- Henri Breuil (1877–1961) – priest, archaeologist, anthropologist, ethnologist and geologist
- Jan Brożek (1585–1652) – Polish canon, polymath, mathematician, astronomer, and physician; the most prominent Polish mathematician of the 17th century
- Pádraig de Brún (1889–1960) – Irish priest, mathematician, poet, and classical scholar; served as Professor of Mathematics at St. Patrick's College, Maynooth, President of University College Galway, and Chairman of the Council of the Dublin Institute for Advanced Studies
- Louis-Ovide Brunet (1826–1876) – priest, one of the founding fathers of Canadian botany
- Ismaël Bullialdus (1605–1694) – priest, astronomer, and member of the Royal Society; the Bullialdus crater is named in his honor
- Jean Buridan (c. 1300 – after 1358) – priest who formulated early ideas of momentum and inertial motion and sowed the seeds of the Copernican Revolution in Europe
- Tom Burke (1923–2008) – Irish Carmelite priest, physicist and school teacher, and co-founder of the Young Scientist and Technology Exhibition
- Roberto Busa (1913–2011) – Jesuit, wrote a lemmatization of the complete works of St. Thomas Aquinas (Index Thomisticus) which was later digitalized by IBM

=== C ===
- Niccolò Cabeo (1586–1650) – Jesuit mathematician; the crater Cabeus is named in his honor
- Nicholas Callan (1799–1846) – priest and Irish scientist best known for his work on the induction coil
- Luca de Samuele Cagnazzi (1764–1852) – archdeacon, mathematician, political economist and inventor of the tonograph
- John Cantius (1390–1473) – priest and Buridanist mathematical physicist who further developed the theory of impetus
- Jean Baptiste Carnoy (1836–1899) – priest, has been called the founder of the science of cytology
- Horacio Carochi (1586–1666) – Italian Jesuit priest, scholar of the Náhuatl language
- Giovanni di Casali (died c. 1375) – Franciscan friar who provided a graphical analysis of the motion of accelerated bodies
- Paolo Casati (1617–1707) – Jesuit mathematician who wrote on astronomy, meteorology, and vacuums; the crater Casatus on the Moon is named after him; published Terra machinis mota (1658), a dialogue between Galileo, Paul Guldin and father Marin Mersenne on cosmology, geography, astronomy and geodesy, giving a positive image of Galileo 25 years after his conviction.
- Giovanni Caselli (1815–1891) – priest who developed the pantelegraph, a forerunner of the fax machine
- Laurent Cassegrain (1629–1693) – priest who was the probable namesake of the Cassegrain telescope; the crater Cassegrain on the Moon is named after him
- Louis Bertrand Castel (1688–1757) – French Jesuit physicist who worked on gravity and optics in a Cartesian context
- Benedetto Castelli (1578–1643) – Benedictine mathematician; long-time friend and supporter of Galileo Galilei, who was his teacher; wrote an important work on fluids in motion
- Bonaventura Cavalieri (1598–1647) – Jesuate (not to be confused with Jesuit) known for his work on the problems of optics and motion, work on the precursors of infinitesimal calculus, and the introduction of logarithms to Italy; his principle in geometry partially anticipated integral calculus; the lunar crater Cavalerius is named in his honor
- Antonio José Cavanilles (1745–1804) – priest and leading Spanish taxonomic botanist of the 18th century
- Francesco Cetti (1726–1778) – Jesuit zoologist and mathematician
- Tommaso Ceva (1648–1737) – Jesuit mathematician, poet, and professor who wrote treatises on geometry, gravity, and arithmetic
- Domenico Chelini (1802–1878)- italian priest, physicist-mathematician and professor who wrote treatises on Geometry, Rational Mechanics and Idraulics.
- Christopher Clavius (1538–1612) – German Jesuit mathematician and astronomer, most noted in connection with the Gregorian calendar, his arithmetic books were used by many mathematicians including Leibniz and Descartes
- Gaston-Laurent Coeurdoux (1691–1779) – Jesuit ethnologist and philologer who composed the first treatise of Indology.
- Guy Consolmagno (1952–) – Jesuit astronomer and planetary scientist, serving as Director of the Vatican Observatory
- Nicolaus Copernicus (1473–1543) – Renaissance astronomer and canon famous for his heliocentric cosmology that set in motion the Copernican Revolution
- Vincenzo Coronelli (1650–1718) – Franciscan cosmographer, cartographer, encyclopedist, and globe-maker
- Bonaventura Corti (1729–1813) – Italian biologist and physicist who made microscopic observations on Tremels, rotifers and seaweeds
- George Coyne (1933–2020) – Jesuit astronomer and former director of the Vatican Observatory whose research interests have been in polarimetric studies of various subjects, including Seyfert galaxies
- James Cullen (mathematician) (1867–1933) – Jesuit mathematician who published what is now known as Cullen numbers in number theory
- James Curley (astronomer) (1796–1889) – Jesuit, first director of Georgetown Observatory and determined the latitude and longitude of Washington, D.C.
- Albert Curtz (1600–1671) – Jesuit astronomer who expanded on the works of Tycho Brahe and contributed to early understanding of the Moon; the crater Curtius on the Moon is named after him
- Johann Baptist Cysat (1587–1657) – Jesuit mathematician and astronomer, after whom the lunar crater Cysatus is named; published the first printed European book concerning Japan; one of the first to make use of the newly developed telescope; did important research on comets and the Orion Nebula
- Jean-Baptiste Chappe d'Auteroche (1722–1769) – priest and astronomer best known for his observations of the transits of Venus

=== D ===
- Ignazio Danti (1536–1586) – Dominican mathematician, astronomer, cosmographer, and cartographer
- Armand David (1826–1900) – Lazarist priest, zoologist, and botanist who did important work in these fields in China
- Francesco Denza (1834–1894) – Barnabite meteorologist, astronomer, and director of Vatican Observatory
- Václav Prokop Diviš (1698–1765) – Czech priest who studied electrical phenomenons and constructed, among other inventions, the first electrified musical instrument in history
- Johann Dzierzon (1811–1906) – priest and pioneering apiarist who discovered the phenomenon of parthenogenesis among bees, and designed the first successful movable-frame beehive; has been described as the "father of modern apiculture"

=== E ===
- Joseph Epping (1835–1884) – Jesuit astronomer and Assyriologist.

=== F ===
- Francesco Faà di Bruno (c. 1825–1888) – priest and mathematician beatified by Pope John Paul II
- Honoré Fabri (1607–1688) – Jesuit mathematician and physicist
- Jean-Charles de la Faille (1597–1652) – Jesuit mathematician who determined the center of gravity of the sector of a circle for the first time
- Gabriele Falloppio (1523–1562) – canon and one of the most important anatomists and physicians of the sixteenth century; the fallopian tubes, which extend from the uterus to the ovaries, are named for him
- Benito Jerónimo Feijóo y Montenegro (1676–1764) – Benedictine monk, polymath, wrote on science, education, history, religion, literature, philology, philosophy and medicine.
- Gyula Fényi (1845–1927) – Jesuit astronomer and director of the Haynald Observatory; noted for his observations of the Sun; the crater Fényi on the Moon is named after him
- Louis Feuillée (1660–1732) – Minim explorer, astronomer, geographer, and botanist
- Kevin T. FitzGerald (1955–) – American molecular biologist and holds the Dr. David Lauler chair in Catholic Health Care Ethics at Georgetown University
- Placidus Fixlmillner (1721–1791) – Benedictine priest and one of the first astronomers to compute the orbit of Uranus
- Paolo Frisi (1728–1784) – priest, mathematician, and astronomer who did significant work in hydraulics
- Paolo Antonio Foscarini (c. 1565–1616) – Carmelite father and scientist who wrote about liberal arts, mathematics, physics, and metaphysics
- José Gabriel Funes (1963–) – Jesuit astronomer and former director of the Vatican Observatory
- Lorenzo Fazzini (1787–1837) – priest and physicist born in Vieste and working in Naples

=== G ===
- Joseph Galien (1699 – c. 1762) – Dominican professor who wrote on aeronautics, hailstorms, and airships
- Jean Gallois (1632–1707) – French scholar, abbot, and member of Académie des Sciences
- Leonardo Garzoni (1543–1592) – Jesuit natural philosopher; author of the first known example of a modern treatment of magnetic phenomena
- Pierre Gassendi (1592–1655) – French priest, astronomer, and mathematician who published the first data on the transit of Mercury; best known intellectual project attempted to reconcile Epicurean atomism with Christianity
- Antoine Gaubil (1689–1759) – French astronomer who was the director general of the College of Interpreters at the court of China between 1741 and 1759 and centralized information provided by the Jesuit observatories throughout the world
- Agostino Gemelli (1878–1959) – Capuchin Franciscan physician and psychologist; founded Catholic University of the Sacred Heart in Milan
- Niccolò Gianpriamo (1686–1759) – Italian Jesuit, missionary and astronomer
- Giuseppe Maria Giovene (1753–1837) – Italian archpriest, naturalist, meteorologist, agronomist and entomologist
- Johannes von Gmunden (c. 1380 – 1442) – canon, mathematician, and astronomer who compiled astronomical tables; Asteroid 15955 Johannesgmunden named in his honor
- Carlos de Sigüenza y Góngora (1645–1700) – priest, polymath, mathematician, astronomer, and cartographer; drew the first map of all of New Spain
- Gilles-François de Gottignies (1630–1689) – Belgian Jesuit mathematician and astronomer.
- Andrew Gordon (1712–1751) – Benedictine monk, priest, physicist, and inventor who made the first electric motor
- Guido Grandi (1671–1742) – Italian monk, priest, philosopher, theologian, mathematician, and engineer
- Giovanni Antonio Grassi (1775–1849) – Jesuit astronomer who calculated the longitude of Washington, D.C.
- Orazio Grassi (1583–1654) – Jesuit mathematician, astronomer and architect; engaged in controversy with Galileo on the subject of comets
- Christoph Grienberger (1561–1636) – Jesuit astronomer after whom the crater Gruemberger on the Moon is named; verified Galileo's discovery of Jupiter's moons
- Francesco Maria Grimaldi (1618–1663) – Jesuit who discovered the diffraction of light (indeed coined the term "diffraction"), investigated the free fall of objects, and built and used instruments to measure geological features on the moon
- Robert Grosseteste (c. 1175 – 1253) – bishop who was one of the most knowledgeable men of the Middle Ages; has been called "the first man ever to write down a complete set of steps for performing a scientific experiment"
- Johann Grueber (1623–1680) – Jesuit missionary and astronomer in China
- Paul Guldin (1577–1643) – Jesuit mathematician and astronomer who discovered the Guldinus theorem to determine the surface and the volume of a solid of revolution
- Bartolomeu de Gusmão (1685–1724) – Jesuit known for his early work on lighter-than-air airship design
- Martin Gusinde (1886–1969)- Austrian priest and ethnologist famous for his work in anthropology

=== H ===
- Johann Georg Hagen (1847–1930) – Jesuit director of the Georgetown and Vatican Observatories; the crater Hagen on the Moon is named after him
- Frank Haig (1928–2024) – American physics professor
- Nicholas Halma (1755–1828) – French abbot, mathematician, and translator
- Jean-Baptiste du Hamel (1624–1706) – French priest, natural philosopher, and secretary of the Academie Royale des Sciences
- René Just Haüy (1743–1822) – priest known as the father of crystallography
- Maximilian Hell (1720–1792) – Jesuit astronomer and director of the Vienna Observatory who wrote astronomy tables and observed the Transit of Venus; the crater Hell on the Moon is named after him
- Michał Heller (1936–) – Polish priest, Templeton Prize winner, and prolific writer on numerous scientific topics
- Lorenz Hengler (1806–1858) – priest often credited as the inventor of the horizontal pendulum
- Hermann of Reichenau (1013–1054) – Benedictine historian, music theorist, astronomer, and mathematician
- Lorenzo Hervás y Panduro (1735–1809) – Jesuit philologer and discoverer of the Austronesian language family.
- Pierre Marie Heude (1836–1902) – Jesuit missionary and zoologist who studied the natural history of Eastern Asia
- Franz von Paula Hladnik (1773–1844) – priest and botanist who discovered several new kinds of plants, and certain genera have been named after him
- Giovanni Battista Hodierna (1597–1660) – priest and astronomer who catalogued nebulous objects and developed an early microscope
- Johann Baptiste Horvath (1732–1799) – Hungarian physicist who taught physics and philosophy at the University of Tyrnau, later of Buda, and wrote many Newtonian textbooks
- Victor-Alphonse Huard (1853–1929) – priest, naturalist, educator, writer, and promoter of the natural sciences

=== I ===
- Maximus von Imhof (1758–1817) – German Augustinian physicist and director of the Munich Academy of Sciences
- Giovanni Inghirami (1779–1851) – Italian Piarist astronomer who has a valley on the Moon named after him as well as a crater

=== J ===
- Frans Alfons Janssens (1865–1924) – Catholic priest and the discoverer of crossing-over of genes during meiosis, which he called 'chiasmatypie'
- François Jacquier (1711–1788) – Franciscan mathematician and physicist; at his death he was connected with nearly all the great scientific and literary societies of Europe
- Stanley Jaki (1924–2009) – Benedictine priest and prolific writer who wrote on the relationship between science and theology
- Ányos Jedlik (1800–1895) – Benedictine engineer, physicist, and inventor; considered by Hungarians and Slovaks to be the unsung father of the dynamo and electric motor

=== K ===
- Georg Joseph Kamel (1661–1706) – Jesuit missionary and botanist who established the first pharmacy in the Philippines; the genus Camellia is named for him
- Eusebio Kino (1645–1711) – Jesuit missionary, explorer, mathematician, astronomer and cartographer; drew maps based on his explorations first showing that California was not an island, as then believed; published an astronomical treatise in Mexico City of his observations of the Kirsch comet
- Otto Kippes (1905–1994) – priest acknowledged for his work in asteroid orbit calculations; the main belt asteroid 1780 Kippes was named in his honour
- Athanasius Kircher (1602–1680) – Jesuit who has been called the father of Egyptology and "Master of a hundred arts"; wrote an encyclopedia of China; one of the first people to observe microbes through a microscope; in his Scrutinium Pestis of 1658 he noted the presence of "little worms" or "animalcules" in the blood, and concluded that the disease was caused by micro-organisms; this is antecedent to germ theory
- Wenceslas Pantaleon Kirwitzer (1588–1626) – Jesuit astronomer and missionary to China who published observations of comets
- Jan Krzysztof Kluk (1739–1796) – priest, naturalist agronomist, and entomologist who wrote a multi-volume work on Polish animal life
- Marian Wolfgang Koller (1792–1866) – Benedictine professor who wrote on astronomy, physics, and meteorology
- Franz Xaver Kugler (1862–1929) – Jesuit chemist, mathematician, and Assyriologist who is most noted for his studies of cuneiform tablets and Babylonian astronomy

=== L ===
- Ramon Llull (c. 1232 – c. 1315) – Majorcan writer and philosopher, logician and a Franciscan tertiary considered a pioneer of computation theory
- Nicolas Louis de Lacaille (1713–1762) – French deacon and astronomer noted for cataloguing stars, nebulous objects, and constellations
- Joseph-Clovis-Kemner Laflamme (1849–1910) – chair of mineralogy and geology at Université Laval, president of the Royal Society of Canada from 1891 to 1892, and chevalier of the Légion d'honneur
- Eugene Lafont (1837–1908) – Jesuit physicist, astronomer, and founder of the first Scientific Society in India
- Antoine de Laloubère (1600–1664) – Jesuit and first mathematician to study the properties of the helix
- Bernard Lamy (1640–1715) – Oratorian philosopher and mathematician who wrote on the parallelogram of forces
- Diego de Landa (1524–1579) – Spanish bishop of Yucatán, scholar of the Mayan civilization and literature (but also guilty of the destruction of numerous Mayan codices)
- Dámaso Antonio Larrañaga (1771–1848) – Uruguayan priest, naturalist and botanist who made important contributions to these scientific disciplines. He was a decisive influence behind the foundation of the National Library of Uruguay and the National University of Uruguay. His face appears on the 2000 Uruguayan peso banknotes.
- Pierre André Latreille (1762–1833) – priest and entomologist whose works describing insects assigned many of the insect taxa still in use
- Georges Lemaître (1894–1966) – Belgian priest and father of the Big Bang theory
- Émile Licent (1876–1952) – French Jesuit trained as a natural historian; spent more than 25 years researching in Tianjin, China
- Joseph Liesganig (1719–1799) – Austrian astronomer and geodesist who managed the Jesuit observatory in Vienna between 1756 and 1773
- Thomas Linacre (c. 1460 – 1524) – English priest, humanist, translator, and physician
- Francis Line (1595–1675) – Jesuit magnetic clock and sundial maker who disagreed with some of the findings of Newton and Boyle
- Juan Caramuel y Lobkowitz (1606–1682) – Cistercian who wrote on a variety of scientific subjects, including probability theory
- João de Loureiro (1717–1791) – Portuguese mathematician and botanist active in Cochinchina
- Bernardo de Lugo (late 16th c. – 17th c., after 1619) – Spanish friar, scholar of the Chibcha (or Muisca) language

=== M ===
- Jean Mabillon (1632–1707) – Benedictine monk and scholar, considered the founder of palaeography and diplomatics
- James B. Macelwane (1883–1956) – Jesuit seismologist who contributed a volume to the first textbook on seismology in America
- John MacEnery (1797–1841) – archaeologist who investigated the Palaeolithic remains at Kents Cavern
- Pietro Maffi (1858–1931) – Director of the Vatican Observatory
- Manuel Magri (1851–1907) – Jesuit ethnographer, archaeologist and writer; one of Malta's pioneers in archaeology
- Emmanuel Maignan (1601–1676) – Minim physicist and professor of medicine who published works on gnomonics and perspective
- Christopher Maire (1697–1767) – Jesuit astronomer and mathematician who collaborated with Roger Boscovich on calculations of the arc of the meridian
- Pál Makó (1724–1793) – Hungarian mathematician and physicist who taught mathematics, experimental physics and mechanics at the Vienna Theresianum and had a part in the preparation of the Ratio educationis (1777), which reformed the imperial teaching system in the spirit of Enlightenment
- Charles Malapert (1581–1630) – Jesuit writer, astronomer, and proponent of Aristotelian cosmology; also known for observations of sunspots, the lunar surface, and the southern sky; the crater Malapert on the Moon is named after him
- Nicolas Malebranche (1638–1715) – Oratorian philosopher who studied physics, optics, and the laws of motion and disseminated the ideas of Descartes and Leibniz
- Marcin of Urzędów (c. 1500 – 1573) – priest, physician, pharmacist, and botanist
- Joseph Maréchal (1878–1944) – Jesuit philosopher and psychologist
- Edme Mariotte (c. 1620 – 1684) – priest and physicist who recognized Boyle's Law and wrote about the nature of color
- Francesco Maurolico (1494–1575) – Benedictine who made contributions to the fields of geometry, optics, conics, mechanics, music, and astronomy, and gave the first known proof by mathematical induction
- Christian Mayer (astronomer) (1719–1783) – Jesuit astronomer most noted for pioneering the study of binary stars
- James Robert McConnell (1915–1999) – Irish theoretical physicist, pontifical academician, Monsignor
- Michael C. McFarland (1948–) – American computer scientist and president of the College of the Holy Cross in Worcester, Massachusetts
- Paul McNally (1890–1955) – Jesuit astronomer and director of Georgetown Observatory; the crater McNally on the Moon is named after him
- William W. Meissner (1931–2010) – Jesuit psychiatrist and psychoanalytic theorist, recipient of the Oskar Pfister Award and William C. Bier Award
- Gregor Mendel (1822–1884) – Augustinian friar and father of genetics
- Pietro Mengoli (1626–1686) – priest and mathematician who first posed the famous Basel Problem
- Giuseppe Mercalli (1850–1914) – priest, volcanologist, and director of the Vesuvius Observatory who is best remembered today for his Mercalli scale for measuring earthquakes which is still in use
- Marin Mersenne (1588–1648) – Minim philosopher, mathematician, and music theorist, so-called "father of acoustics"
- Paul of Middelburg (1446–1534) – Bishop who wrote on the reform of the calendar
- Maciej Miechowita (1457–1523) – canon who wrote the first accurate geographical and ethnographical description of Eastern Europe, as well as two medical treatises
- François-Napoléon-Marie Moigno (1804–1884) – Jesuit physicist and mathematician; was an expositor of science and translator rather than an original investigator
- Juan Ignacio Molina (1740–1829) – Jesuit naturalist, historian, botanist, ornithologist and geographer
- Gerald Molloy (1834–1906) – Irish priest, professor of natural philosophy at (and later Rector of) the Catholic University of Ireland, and expert on electricity
- Louis Moréri (1643–1680) – 17th-century priest and encyclopaedist
- Theodorus Moretus (1602–1667) – Jesuit mathematician and author of the first mathematical dissertations ever defended in Prague; the lunar crater Moretus is named after him
- Roberto Landell de Moura (1861–1928) – Brazilian Jesuit, developing long-distance audio transmissions, using a variety of technologies, including an improved megaphone device. photophone (using light beams) and radio signals.
- Gabriel Mouton (1618–1694) – abbot, mathematician, astronomer, and early proponent of the metric system
- Jozef Murgaš (1864–1929) – priest who contributed to wireless telegraphy and helped develop mobile communications and wireless transmission of information and human voice
- José Celestino Mutis (1732–1808) – canon, botanist, and mathematician who led the Royal Botanical Expedition of the New World

=== N ===
- Bienvenido Nebres (1940–) – Filipino mathematician, president of Ateneo de Manila University, and an honoree of the National Scientist of the Philippines award
- John Needham (1713–1781) – English biologist and Catholic priest
- Antonio Neri (1576–1614) – Italian priest who wrote the first major treatise on the science of glassmaking
- Jean François Niceron (1613–1646) – Minim mathematician who studied geometrical optics
- Nicholas of Cusa (1401–1464) – cardinal, philosopher, jurist, mathematician, astronomer, and one of the great geniuses and polymaths of the 15th century
- Julius Nieuwland (1878–1936) – Holy Cross priest, known for his contributions to acetylene research and its use as the basis for one type of synthetic rubber, which eventually led to the invention of neoprene by DuPont
- Jean-Antoine Nollet (1700–1770) – abbot and physicist who discovered the phenomenon of osmosis in natural membranes

=== O ===
- Hugo Obermaier (1877–1946) – priest, prehistorian, and anthropologist who is known for his work on the diffusion of mankind in Europe during the Ice Age, as well as his work with north Spanish cave art
- William of Ockham (c. 1288 – c. 1348) – Franciscan Scholastic who wrote significant works on logic, physics, and theology; known for Occam's razor-principle
- Nicole Oresme (c. 1323 – 1382) – one of the most famous and influential philosophers of the later Middle Ages; economist, mathematician, physicist, astronomer, philosopher, theologian and Bishop of Lisieux, and competent translator; one of the most original thinkers of the 14th century
- Barnaba Oriani (1752–1832) – Barnabite geodesist, astronomer and scientist whose greatest achievement was his detailed research of the planet Uranus; also known for Oriani's theorem

=== P ===
- Tadeusz Pacholczyk (1964–) – priest, neuroscientist and writer
- Luca Pacioli (c. 1446–1517) – Franciscan friar who published several works on mathematics; often regarded as the "father of accounting"
- Kuruvilla Pandikattu (1957–) – Jesuit priest, philosopher and physicist, who has attempted to foster science-religion dialogue in India.
- Ignace-Gaston Pardies (1636–1673) – Jesuit physicist known for his correspondence with Newton and Descartes
- Franciscus Patricius (1529–1597) – priest, cosmic theorist, philosopher, and Renaissance scholar
- John Peckham (1230–1292) – Archbishop of Canterbury and early practitioner of experimental science
- Nicolas Claude Fabri de Peiresc (1580–1637) – abbot and astronomer who discovered the Orion Nebula; lunar crater Peirescius named in his honor
- Stephen Joseph Perry (1833–1889) – Jesuit astronomer and Fellow of the Royal Society; made frequent observations of Jupiter's satellites, of stellar occultations, of comets, of meteorites, of sun spots, and faculae
- Giambattista Pianciani (1784–1862) – Jesuit mathematician and physicist who established the electric nature of aurora borealis
- Giuseppe Piazzi (1746–1826) – Theatine mathematician and astronomer who discovered Ceres, today known as the largest member of the asteroid belt; also did important work cataloguing stars
- Jean Picard (1620–1682) – priest and first person to measure the size of the Earth to a reasonable degree of accuracy; also developed what became the standard method for measuring the right ascension of a celestial object; the PICARD mission, an orbiting solar observatory, is named in his honor
- Edward Pigot (1858–1929) – Jesuit seismologist and astronomer
- Alexandre Guy Pingré (1711–1796) – French priest astronomer and naval geographer; the crater Pingré on the Moon is named after him, as is the asteroid 12719 Pingré
- Andrew Pinsent (1966–) – priest whose current research includes the application of insights from autism and social cognition to 'second-person' accounts of moral perception and character formation; his previous scientific research contributed to the DELPHI experiment at CERN
- Jean Baptiste François Pitra (1812–1889) – Benedictine cardinal, archaeologist and theologian who noteworthy for his great archaeological discoveries
- Charles Plumier (1646–1704) – Minim friar who is considered one of the most important botanical explorers of his time
- Marcin Odlanicki Poczobutt (1728–1810) – Jesuit astronomer and mathematician; granted the title of the King's Astronomer; the crater Poczobutt on the Moon is named after him; taught astronomy at Vilna University (1764–1808), managed its observatory and was the rector of Vilna University between 1777 and 1808
- Léon Abel Provancher (1820–1892) – priest and naturalist devoted to the study and description of the fauna and flora of Canada; his pioneer work won for him the appellation of the "father of natural history in Canada"

=== R ===
- Claude Rabuel (1669–1729) – Jesuit mathematician who analyzed Descartes's Géométrie
- Ivan Ratkaj (1647–1683) – Croatian Jesuit missionary, explorer, cartographer and writer; wrote the first detailed description of the Tarahumara, a native Mexican people
- Louis Receveur (1757–1788) – Franciscan naturalist and astronomer; described as being as close as one could get to being an ecologist in the 18th century
- Franz Reinzer (1661–1708) – Jesuit who wrote an in-depth meteorological, astrological, and political compendium covering topics such as comets, meteors, lightning, winds, fossils, metals, bodies of water, and subterranean treasures and secrets of the earth
- Louis Rendu (1789–1859) – bishop who wrote an important book on the mechanisms of glacial motion; the Rendu Glacier, Alaska, US and Mount Rendu, Antarctica are named for him
- Vincenzo Riccati (1707–1775) – Italian Jesuit mathematician and physicist
- Matteo Ricci (1552–1610) – one of the founding fathers of the Jesuit China Mission and co-author of the first European-Chinese dictionary
- Giovanni Battista Riccioli (1598–1671) – Jesuit astronomer who authored Almagestum novum, an influential encyclopedia of astronomy; the first person to measure the rate of acceleration of a freely falling body; created a selenograph with Father Grimaldi that now adorns the entrance at the National Air and Space Museum in Washington, D.C.; first to note that Mizar was a "double star"
- Richard of Wallingford (1292–1336) – abbot, renowned clockmaker, and one of the initiators of western trigonometry
- Lluís Rodés i Campderà (1881–1939) – Spanish astronomer and director of Observatorio del Ebro, wrote El Firmamento
- Johannes Ruysch (c. 1460 – 1533) – priest, explorer, cartographer, and astronomer who created the second oldest known printed representation of the New World

=== S ===
- Giovanni Girolamo Saccheri (1667–1733) – Jesuit mathematician and geometer who was perhaps the first European to write about Non-Euclidean geometry
- Johannes de Sacrobosco (c. 1195 – c. 1256) – Irish monk and astronomer who wrote the authoritative medieval astronomy text Tractatus de Sphaera; his Algorismus was the first text to introduce Hindu-Arabic numerals and procedures into the European university curriculum; the lunar crater Sacrobosco is named after him
- Bernardino de Sahagún (c. 1499 – 1590) – Spanish scholar of the Náhuatl language, ethnographer and anthropologist
- Gregoire de Saint-Vincent (1584–1667) – Jesuit mathematician who made important contributions to the study of the hyperbola
- Anthony Ichiro Sanda (1944–) – deacon and particle physicist; co-awarded the 2004 Sakurai Prize for his work on CP violation and B meson decays
- Alphonse Antonio de Sarasa (1618–1667) – Jesuit mathematician who contributed to the understanding of logarithms
- Christoph Scheiner (c. 1573 – 1650) – Jesuit physicist, astronomer, and inventor of the pantograph; wrote on a wide range of scientific subjects, including sunspots, leading to a dispute with Galileo Galilei
- Wilhelm Schmidt (linguist) (1868–1954) – Austrian priest and missionary of The Society of the Divine Word; linguist, anthropologist, and ethnologist
- Hermann Schmitz (entomologist) (1878–1960) – German Jesuit and entomologist who specialised in Hymenoptera and Diptera.
- George Schoener (1864–1941) – priest who became known in the United States as the "Padre of the Roses" for his experiments in rose breeding
- Gaspar Schott (1608–1666) – Jesuit physicist, astronomer, and natural philosopher who is most widely known for his works on hydraulic and mechanical instruments
- Franz von Paula Schrank (1747–1835) – priest, botanist, entomologist, and prolific writer
- Berthold Schwarz (c. 14th century) – Franciscan friar and reputed inventor of gunpowder and firearms
- Anton Maria Schyrleus of Rheita (1604–1660) – Capuchin astronomer and optician who built Kepler's telescope
- George Mary Searle (1839–1918) – Paulist astronomer and professor who discovered six galaxies
- Angelo Secchi (1818–1878) – Jesuit pioneer in astronomical spectroscopy and one of the first scientists to state authoritatively that the Sun is a star; discovered the existence of solar spicules and drew an early map of Mars
- Alessandro Serpieri (1823–1885) – priest, astronomer, and seismologist who studied shooting stars, and was the first to introduce the concept of the seismic radiant
- Serafino Serrati (18th century) – Benedictine monk, attributed the invention of a steamboat, also made observations about aerostatic globes
- Gerolamo Sersale (1584–1654) – Jesuit astronomer and selenographer; his map of the Moon can be seen in the Naval Observatory of San Fernando; the lunar crater Sirsalis is named after him
- Benedict Sestini (1816–1890) – Jesuit astronomer, mathematician and architect; studied sunspots and eclipses; wrote textbooks on a variety of mathematical subjects
- Mihalj Šilobod Bolšić (1724–1787) – Roman Catholic priest, mathematician, writer, and musical theorist primarily known for writing the first Croatian arithmetic textbook Arithmatika Horvatzka (published in Zagreb, 1758)
- René François Walter de Sluse (1622–1685) – canon and mathematician with a family of curves named after him
- Domingo de Soto (1494–1560) – Spanish Dominican priest and professor at the University of Salamanca; in his commentaries to Aristotle he proposed that free-falling bodies undergo constant acceleration
- Lazzaro Spallanzani (1729–1799) – priest, biologist, and physiologist who made important contributions to the experimental study of bodily functions, animal reproduction, and essentially discovered echolocation; his research of biogenesis paved the way for the investigations of Louis Pasteur
- Valentin Stansel (1621–1705) – Jesuit astronomer in Brazil, who discovered a comet, which, after accurate positions were made via F. de Gottignies in Goa, became known as the Estancel-Gottignies comet
- Johan Stein (1871–1951) – Jesuit astronomer and director of the Vatican Observatory, which he modernized and relocated to Castel Gandolfo; the crater Stein on the far side of the Moon is named after him
- Nicolas Steno (1638–1686) – bishop beatified by Pope John Paul II who is often called the father of geology and stratigraphy, and is known for Steno's principles
- Joseph Stepling (1716–1778) – Bohemian astronomer, physicist and mathematician who managed the Jesuit observatory in Prague between 1751 and 1778
- Antonio Stoppani (1824–1891) – Italian priest, geologist, and palaeontologist
- Pope Sylvester II (c. 946 – 1003) – prolific scholar who endorsed and promoted Arabic knowledge of arithmetic, mathematics, and astronomy in Europe, reintroducing the abacus and armillary sphere which had been lost to Europe since the end of the Greco-Roman era
- Johann Strassmaier (1846–1920) – Jesuit Assyriologist.
- Alexius Sylvius Polonus (1593 – c. 1653) – Jesuit astronomer who studied sunspots and published a work on calendariography
- Ignacije Szentmartony (1718–1793) – Croatian Jesuit cartographer and royal mathematician and astronomer, who became a member of the expedition that worked on the rearrangement of the frontiers among colonies in South America, especially Brazil

=== T ===
- André Tacquet (1612–1660) – Jesuit mathematician whose work laid the groundwork for the eventual discovery of calculus
- Pierre Teilhard de Chardin (1881–1955) – Jesuit paleontologist and geologist who took part in the discovery of Peking Man
- Francesco Lana de Terzi (c. 1631 – 1687) – Jesuit referred to as the Father of Aviation for his pioneering efforts; he also developed a blind writing alphabet prior to Braille.
- Matthew Pothen Thekaekara (1914–1974) – Jesuit priest who published the Thekaekara spectrum
- Theodoric of Freiberg (c. 1250 – c. 1310) – Dominican theologian and physicist who gave the first correct geometrical analysis of the rainbow
- Joseph Tiefenthaler (1710–1785) – Jesuit who was one of the earliest European geographers to write about India
- Giuseppe Toaldo (1719–1797) – priest and physicist who studied atmospheric electricity and did important work with lightning rods; the asteroid 23685 Toaldo is named for him
- José Torrubia (c. 1700 – 1768) – Franciscan linguist, scientist, collector of fossils and books, and writer on historical, political and religious subjects
- Franz de Paula Triesnecker (1745–1817) – Jesuit astronomer and director of the Vienna Observatory; published a number of treatises on astronomy and geography; the crater Triesnecker on the Moon is named after him

=== V ===
- Basil Valentine – priest chemistry
- Luca Valerio (1552–1618) – Jesuit mathematician who developed ways to find volumes and centers of gravity of solid bodies
- Pierre Varignon (1654–1722) – priest and mathematician whose principle contributions were to statics and mechanics; created a mechanical explanation of gravitation
- Jacques de Vaucanson (1709–1782) – French Minim friar inventor and artist who was responsible for the creation of impressive and innovative automata and machines such as the first completely automated loom
- Giovanni Battista Venturi (1746–1822) – priest who discovered the Venturi effect
- Fausto Veranzio (c. 1551 – 1617) – bishop, polymath, inventor, and lexicographer
- Ferdinand Verbiest (1623–1688) – Jesuit astronomer and mathematician; designed what some claim to be the first ever self-propelled vehicle, which many claim this as the world's first automobile
- Francesco de Vico (1805–1848) – Jesuit astronomer who discovered or co-discovered a number of comets; also made observations of Saturn and the gaps in its rings; the lunar crater De Vico and the asteroid 20103 de Vico are named after him
- Vincent of Beauvais (c. 1190 – c. 1264) – Dominican who wrote the most influential encyclopedia of the Middle Ages
- Benito Vines (1837–1893) – Jesuit meteorologist known as "Father Hurricane" who made the first weather model to predict the trajectory of a hurricane
- Vitello (1230–1280/1314)
- János Vitéz (archbishop) (c. 1405 – 1472) – Cardinal Archbishop of Esztergom, astronomer, and mathematician
- Giovanni Serafino Volta (1764–1842) – priest and paleontologist who wrote the first treatise on fossil ichthyology in Italy
- Ivan Vreman (1583–1620) – Jesuit astronomer, physicist, mathematician and missionary known for his work on lunar eclipse, magnetic declinations and determining geographical coordinates

=== W ===
- Martin Waldseemüller (c. 1470 – 1520) – German priest and cartographer who, along with Matthias Ringmann, is credited with the first recorded usage of the word America
- Erich Wasmann (1859–1931) – Austrian entomologist known for Wasmannian mimicry
- Godefroy Wendelin (1580–1667) – priest and astronomer who recognized that Kepler's third law applied to the satellites of Jupiter; the lunar crater Vendelinus is named in his honor
- Johannes Werner (1468–1522) – priest, mathematician, astronomer, and geographer
- Witelo (c. 1230 – after 1280, before 1314) – friar, physicist, natural philosopher, and mathematician; lunar crater Vitello named in his honor; his Perspectiva powerfully influenced later scientists, in particular Johannes Kepler
- Julian Tenison Woods (1832–1889) – Passionist geologist and mineralogist
- Theodor Wulf (1868–1946) – Jesuit physicist who was one of the first experimenters to detect excess atmospheric radiation
- Franz Xaver von Wulfen (1728–1805) – Jesuit botanist, mineralogist, and alpinist

=== X ===
- Leonardo Ximenes (1711–1786) – Italian physicist and astronomer, specialist of hydraulics, creator and director of the Observatory San Giovanino in Florence

=== Z ===
- John Zahm (1851–1921) – Holy Cross priest and South American explorer
- Giuseppe Zamboni (1776–1846) – priest and physicist who invented the Zamboni pile, an early electric battery similar to the Voltaic pile
- Francesco Zantedeschi (1797–1873) – priest who was among the first to recognize the marked absorption by the atmosphere of red, yellow, and green light; published papers on the production of electric currents in closed circuits by the approach and withdrawal of a magnet, thereby anticipating Michael Faraday's classical experiments of 1831
- Thomas Żebrowski (1714–1758) – Jesuit architect, mathematician, and astronomer; instrumental in establishing and funding the Observatory of Vilnius University.
- Casimir Zeglen (1869–after 1927) – Polish American priest, invented a type of silk bulletproof vest
- Niccolò Zucchi (1586–1670) – claimed to have tried to build a reflecting telescope in 1616 but abandoned the idea (maybe due to the poor quality of the mirror); may have been the first to see the belts on the planet Jupiter (1630)
- Godefroy Zumoffen (1848–1928) – French Jesuit archaeologist and geologist notable for his work on prehistory in Lebanon
- Giovanni Battista Zupi (c. 1590 – 1650) – Jesuit astronomer, mathematician, and first person to discover that the planet Mercury had orbital phases; the crater Zupus on the Moon is named after him

== See also ==
- List of lay Catholic scientists
- Parson-naturalist
- Science and the Catholic Church
- Christianity and science
