= Halma (disambiguation) =

Halma may refer to:

- Halma, a board game invented by George Howard Monks, an American thoracic surgeon at Harvard Medical School
- Nicholas Halma (1755-1828), mathematician and translator
- Halma (actor), film actor of the 1910s and '20s, e.g. Le Miracle des loups (1924 film)
- Halma (horse), an American Thoroughbred racehorse
- Halma, Minnesota, a city in the United States
- Halma plc, a group of technology companies that makes products for hazard detection and life protection
- Halma, an 1895 novel by Benito Pérez Galdós, basis of the film Viridiana
- Halma, fictional planet in the science fiction novel Emphyrio by Jack Vance
- Halma, Wallonia, a district of the municipality of Wellin, Belgium
