= Antonio Neri =

Antonio Neri may refer to:

- Antonio Neri (chemist)
- Antonio Neri (businessman)
