= José María Algué =

Spanish priest and meteorologist (1856–1930)

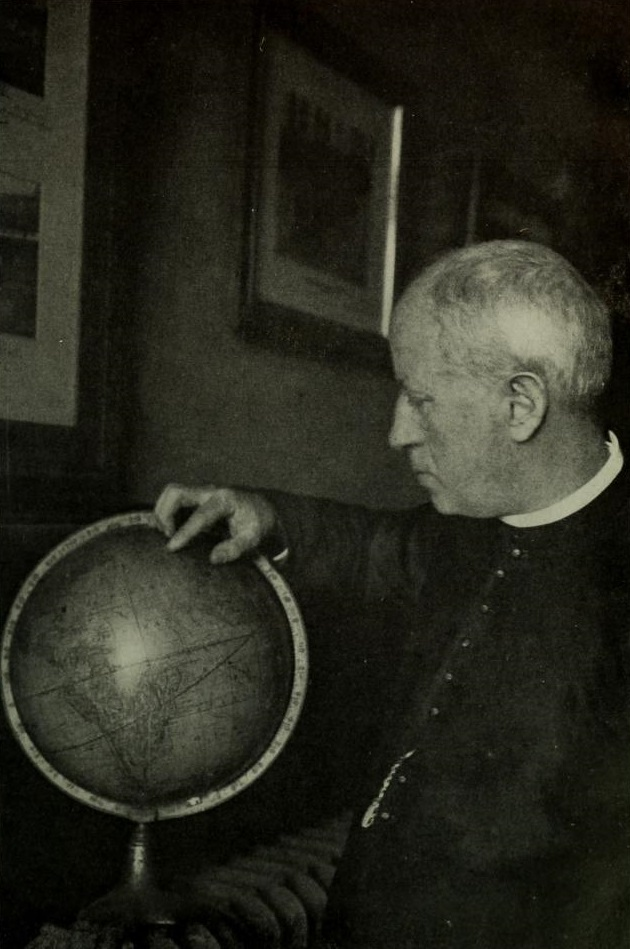
- Born: December 29, 1856; Manresa, Spain
- Died: May 27, 1930 (aged 73); Roquetes, Spain
- Occupation(s): Roman Catholic priest Meteorologist

José María Algué, SJ (29 December 1856 – 27 May 1930), was a Spanish Roman Catholic priest and meteorologist in the observatory of Manila. He invented the barocyclonometer, the nephoscope and a kind of microseismograph. The barocyclonometer was officially adopted by the US Navy and warships of the North Atlantic Squadron were equipped with them around 1914. Father Algué was an honorary member of the Royal Society of London and the Pontificia Accademia Romana.

== Works ==
- (1897). Baguíos y Ciclones Filipinos
- (1897). El Barociclonómetro
- (1898). Las Nubes en el Archipiélago Filipino
- (1898). El Baguio de Samar y Leyte, Octubre 12-13, 1897
- (1900). El Archipiélago Filipino
- (1904). Atlas de Filipinas

Works in English translation

- (1900). Atlas of the Philippine Islands, Government Printing Office.
- (1902). Ground Temperature Observations at Manila, 1896–1902, Bureau of Public Printing.
- (1904). The Climate of the Philippines, Department of Commerce and Labor, Bureau of the Census.
- (1904). The Cyclones of the Far East, Bureau of Public Printing.
- (1908). "The Meteorological Conditions in the Philippine Islands, 1908," Quarterly Journal of the Royal Meteorological Society, Vol. XXXV, No. 151.
- (1909). Mirador Observatory, Baguio, Benguet, Bureau of Printing.

== See also ==
- List of Roman Catholic scientist-clerics
