= Giambattista Pianciani =

Italian Jesuit scientist

- Born: 27 October 1784; Spoleto, Papal States
- Died: 23 March 1862 (aged 77); Rome, Papal States

Giambattista (or Giovanni Battista) Pianciani (27 October 1784, in Spoleto – 23 March 1862, in Rome) was an Italian Jesuit scientist.

== Biography ==
He entered the Society of Jesus on 2 June 1805; after having received the ordinary Jesuit training he was sent to various cities in the Papal States to teach mathematics and physics and finally was appointed professor in the Roman College, where he lectured and wrote on scientific subjects for twenty-four years. He was an active member of the Accademia d'Arcadia, his academical pseudonym being "Polite Megaride", of the Accademia de' Lincei, and of other scientific societies.

His scientific labours were abruptly brought to an end by the Revolution of 1848; he succeeded, however, in making his escape from Rome and having come to America he taught dogmatic theology during the scholastic year 1849-50 at the Jesuit theologate, then connected with Georgetown College in Washington, D.C.

When peace was restored in Rome he returned there and from 1851 till his death was engaged chiefly in administrative duties and in teaching philosophy both in the Roman College and in the Collegio Filosofico in the University of Rome, of which latter college he was president during the last two years of his life.

== Published works ==
- Istituzioni fisico-chimiche (4 vols., Rome, 1833-4);
- Elementi di fisico-chimica (2 vols., Naples, 1840–41);
- In historiam creationis mosaicam commentarius (Naples, 1851), which he wrote whilst at Georgetown and of which there is a German translation by Fridolin Schöttl (Ratisbon, 1853);
- Saggi filosfici (Rome, 1855);
- Nuovi saggi filosofici (Rome, 1856);
- Cosmogonia naturale comparata col Genesi (Rome, 1862).

== See also ==
- List of Roman Catholic scientist-clerics

== Sources ==
Attribution

- Cites:
  - Carlos Sommervogel, Bibliothèque de la Compagnie de Jésus, VI (Brussels, 1895).
