= Frans Alfons Janssens =

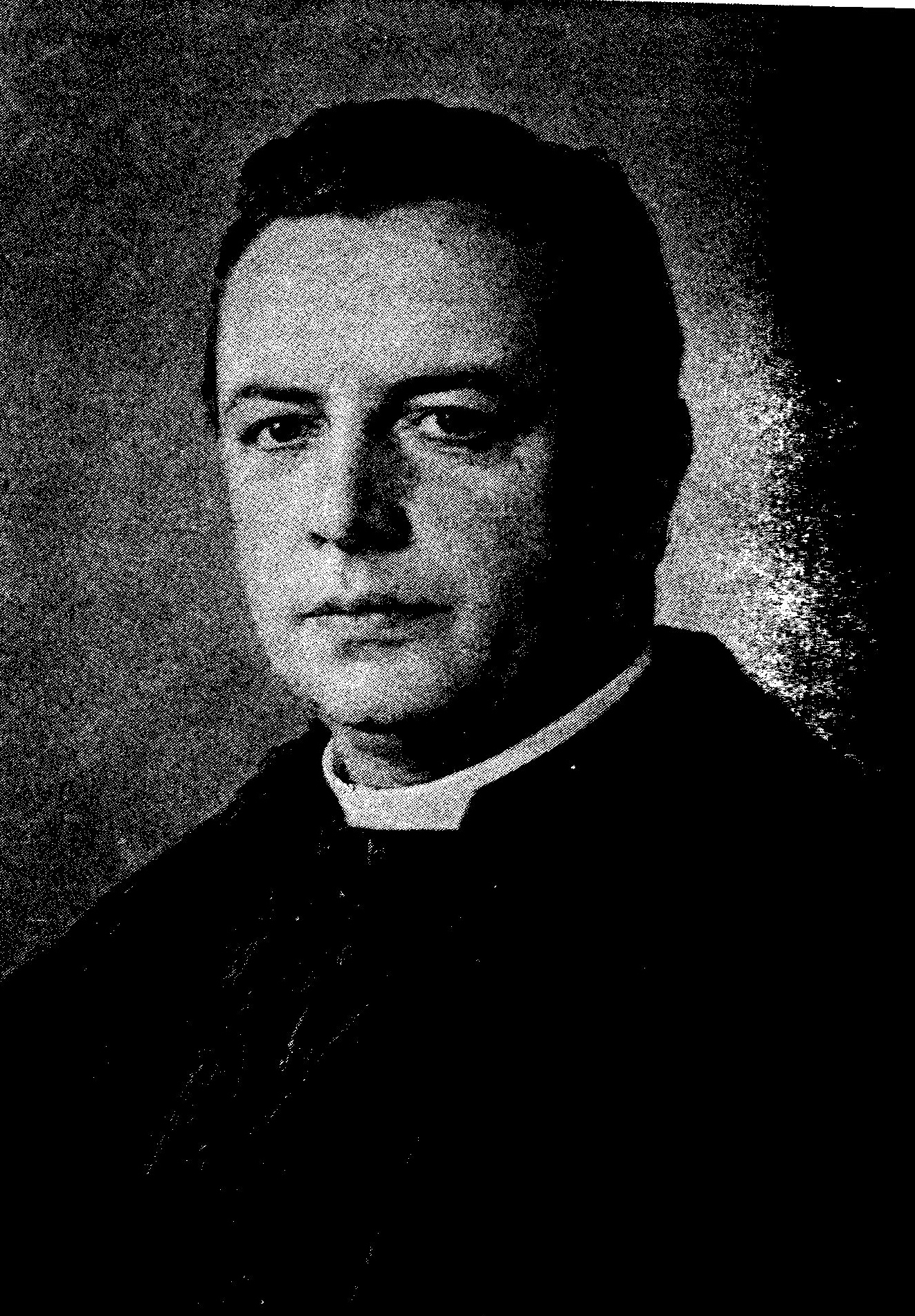
Frans Janssens

Frans Alfons Ignace Maria Janssens (23 July 1863 – 8 October 1924) was Catholic priest and the discoverer of crossing-over of genes during meiosis, which he called "chiasmatypie". His work was continued by the Nobel Prize winner Thomas Hunt Morgan to develop the theory of genetic linkage.

== Life ==
Frans Janssens was born in Sint-Niklaas, the son of Theodoor Janssens, a politician. He was ordained as a priest on 18 September 1886, and obtained a PhD in Natural Science in 1890, with the highest honors and a scholarship to attend many prestigious foreign laboratories. In 1891 he became a teacher in Ghent.

He was sent by his bishop to the brewery school in Munich, then to the Carlsberg Laboratory in Copenhagen, where he worked with Johan Kjeldahl and Emil Christian Hansen. He returned to Belgium, where he co-founded a brewery school and taught bacteriology.

In 1896, he joined the Faculty of Sciences for the Catholic University of Leuven, as a professor in microscopy, and from 1899 in cytology, succeeding Jean-Baptiste Carnoy in the chair.

Janssens was also president of the Societé Belge de Biologie and a Canon (priest) at the Sint-Baafskathedraal in Ghent. He died in Wichelen.

== Research ==
In 1909, Janssens was the first to describe chromosomal crossover, which he called "chiasmatypie". He observed that, during meiosis when chromosomes divide, chromosome halves can approach and swap material with each other.

== Legacy ==
In 1953, the Catholic University of Leuven founded the F. A. Janssens Laboratory of Genetics". The laboratory is now known as the Center of Microbial and Plant Genetics.
