= Gabriel Mouton =

French abbot and scientist (1618–1694)

- Born: 1618
- Died: 28 September 1694 (aged about 76)
- Known for: Proposing a natural standard of length based on the circumference of the Earth.
- Scientific career
- Fields: Mathematics and astronomy

Gabriel Mouton (1618 – 28 September 1694) was a French abbot and scientist. He was a doctor of theology from Lyon, but was also interested in mathematics and astronomy. His 1670 book, the Observationes diametrorum solis et lunae apparentium, proposed a natural standard of length based on the circumference of the Earth, divided decimally. It was influential in the adoption of the metric system in 1799.

== The milliare ==
The system of units
Name	Multiple of virga	Approx. equivalents
Milliare	1000	1 minute of arc, 2 km, 1 nautical mile
Centuria	100	200 m
Decuria	10	20 m
Virga	1	2 m, 1 Parisian toise
Virgula	0.1	20 cm
Decima	0.01	2 cm
Centesima	0.001	2 mm
Millesima	0.0001	0.2 mm

Based on the measurements of the size of the Earth conducted by Riccioli of Bologna (at 321,815 Bologna feet to the degree), Mouton proposed a decimal system of measurement based on the circumference of the Earth, explaining the advantages of a system based on nature.

His suggestion was a unit, the milliare, that was defined as a minute of arc along a meridian arc, and a system of sub-units, dividing successively by factors of ten into the centuria, decuria, virga, virgula, decima, centesima, and millesima. The virga, 1/1000 of a minute of arc, corresponding to 64.4 Bologna inches, or ~2.04 m, was reasonably close to the then current unit of length, the Parisian toise (~1.95 m) – a feature which was meant to make acceptance of the new unit easier.

As a practical implementation, Mouton suggested that the actual standard be based on pendulum movement, so that a pendulum located in Lyon of length one virgula (1/10 virga) would change direction 3959.2 times in half an hour. The resulting pendulum would have a length of ~20.54 cm.

His ideas attracted interest at the time, and were supported by Jean Picard as well as Huygens in 1673, and also studied at Royal Society in London. In 1673, Leibniz independently made proposals similar to those of Mouton.

It would be over a century later, however, that the French Academy of Sciences weights and measures committee suggested the decimal metric system that defined the Metre as, at least initially, a division of the circumference of the Earth. The first official adoption of this system occurred in France in 1791.

By today's measures, his milliare corresponds directly to a nautical mile, and his virga would by definition have been 1.852 m.

== See also ==
- Introduction to the metric system
- List of Roman Catholic scientist-clerics
