= Lorenz Hengler =

German cleric-scientist

Lorenz Hengler (3 February 1806 – 1858) was a Catholic priest, astronomer, and aeronaut, the first of three people to independently invent the horizontal pendulum.

== Life ==
Hengler was born to a family of farmers in Reichenhofen, Württemberg. At the age of fourteen he entered the Latin School of Leutkirch, and attended successively those of Ehingen and Tübingen; during his school holidays, he would entertain himself by building small balloons. In the winter of 1828 he studied mathematics and astronomy at Munich, under the instruction of Franz von Paula Gruithuisen, before leaving for financial reasons and finding employment in an optical workshop in Stuttgart.

Hengler was the first of three people to independently invent the horizontal pendulum, used in early modern seismographs. (The others were Adolphe Perrot in 1862 and Johann Karl Friedrich Zöllner in 1869.) He presented this invention to the Bavarian Academy of Sciences in 1831, and published it in 1832.

During his time in Munich, Hengler also continued his interest in ballooning, building a large balloon which burst into flames shortly after taking off. He subsequently invented, tested, and published on a new model of conical parachute.

Beginning in 1832, Hengler studied at the Tübingen Faculty of Catholic Theology until his ordination in 1835. He continued his work in astronomy as a priest, including working with his brother to build and sell telescopes. At the time of his death in 1858, he was pastor of Tigerfeld.

== See also ==
- List of Roman Catholic scientist-clerics
