= Franz Reinzer =

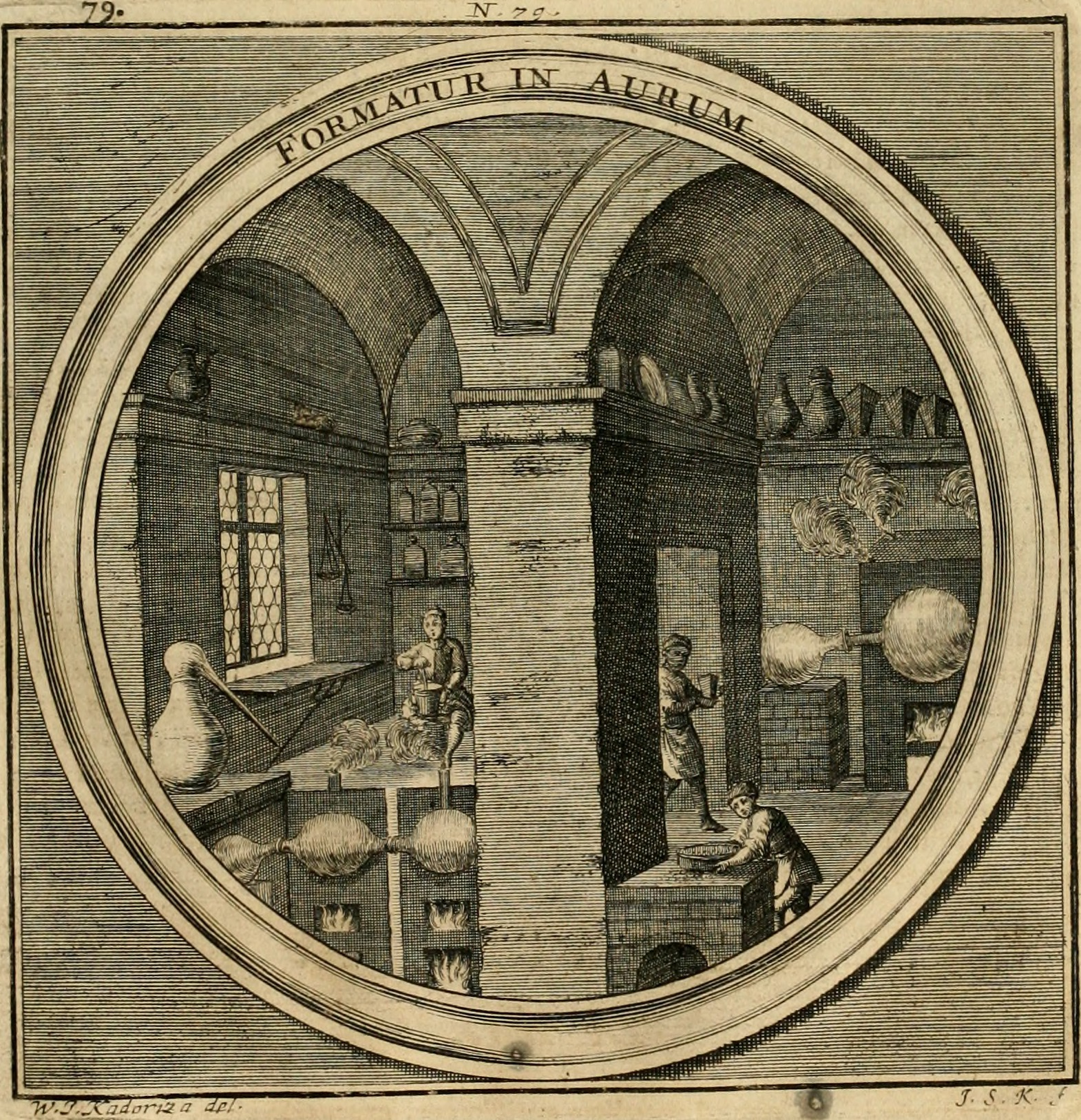
A plate by Wolffgangus Josephus Kadoriza, from Reinzer's Meteorologia philosophico-politica

Franz Reinzer (1661–1708) was an Austrian Jesuit professor of rhetoric, philosophy, and theology at Linz, Graz, Vienna, and Krems. His Meteorologia philosophico-politica, in duodecim dissertationes per quaestiones meteorologicas & conclusiones politicas divisa, appositisque was first published in 1697. A third edition was published posthumously in 1709.

His Meteorologia philosophico-politica is, as its title indicates, a meteorological, astrological, and political compendium. It comprises 12 dissertations – most of which follow Athanasius Kircher. Subjects covered include comets, meteors, lightning, winds, fossils, metals, bodies of water, and subterranean treasures and secrets of the earth. Illustrations in the 1709 edition were done by Wolffgangus Josephus Kadoriza.

Reinzer intended that this work be read by Emperor Joseph I, who was nonetheless hostile towards the Jesuits. His 12 dissertations are subdivided into 84 "questions." These questions not only consider various natural phenomena but also the application of appropriate political policy and behavior in reaction to them. Thus, in his examination on comets, which deals with the appearance of every notable comet from 1500 to 1688, Reinzer discusses the predicted political upheavals and other political events that came in their wakes, and asks that Joseph be a wise and just ruler.

== Sources ==
- Pirages Books
- Meteorologia philosophico-politica : das ist philosophische und politische Beschreib- und Erklärung der meteorischen, oder in der obern Lufft erzeugten Dinge ... ; anjetzo ... aus dem Lateinischen in das Teutsche übersetzt. Wolff, Augspurg 1712. digital

== See also ==
- List of Jesuit scientists
- List of Roman Catholic scientist-clerics
