= Niccolò Gianpriamo =

Italian polymath

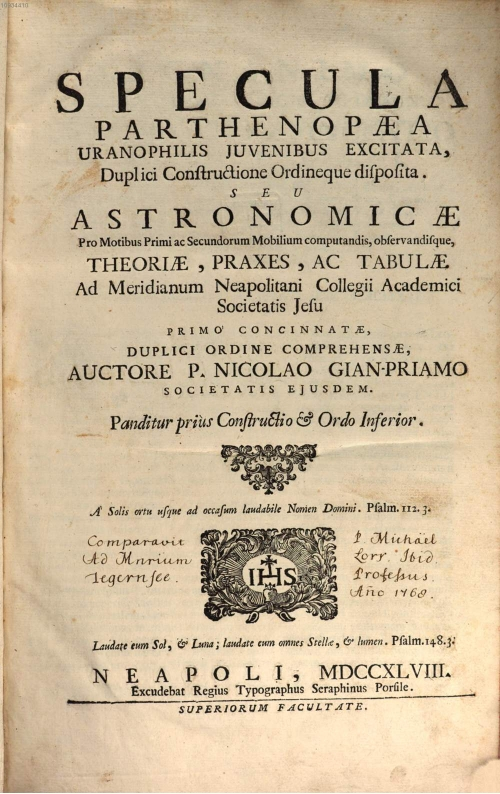
- Frontispiece of the volume published by Gianpriamo in Naples in 1748
- Born: 21 October 1686; Aversa, Kingdom of Naples
- Died: 14 April 1759 (aged 72); Naples, Kingdom of Naples
- Scientific career
- Fields: missionary, theology, mathematics, astronomy

Signature
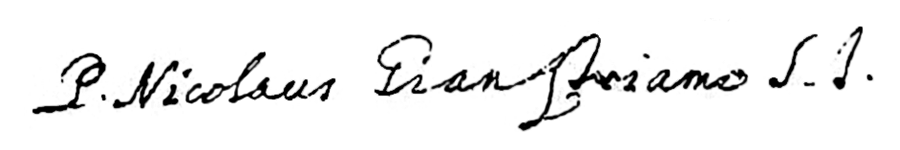

Niccolò Gianpriamo (Aversa, 22 October 1686 – Naples, 14 April 1759) was an Italian Jesuit, missionary and astronomer.

== Biography ==
He entered the Jesuit order in Naples in 1702 and was a missionary throughout China. On 1 January 1705, he asked Father Michelangelo Tamburini, Superior General of the Society of Jesus, if he could go missionary to the East Indies. He was appointed as mathematician at the Beijing imperial court and on 12 April 1714, he embarked from Lisbon for the China. On 17 September of the same year, he arrived in Goa, on the western coast of India. On 16 May 1715, he left Goa and he arrived in Macao on 16 August, Gianpriamo continued his mission to Canton, where he arrived on 22 October 1716 and then in Beijing from 2 January 1717.

In addition to his mathematical commitments, he was also appointed as apostolic notary, transcribing the most significant documents concerning the catholic mission.

With the failure of the legation of the Holy See in China led by Monsignor Carlo Ambrogio Mezzabarba, Gianpriamo left Beijing on 13 March 1721 to report the results of the legation and to bring a letter of the Kangxi Emperor for the Pope. Gianpriamo decided to return to Italy through Russia. He was the only missionary ever authorized by Tsar Peter the Great to cross the Empire. He arrived in Rome on 19 October 1722 and the Pope Innocent XIII ordered him not to leave Rome. In September 1725 he was allowed to return to his province, with the exception of the city of Naples, where he could only reside since 1738.

He taught Italian literature, moral theology, mathematics and astronomy at the Collegio del Salvatore and from 1740 at the Seminary of the Nobles. Gianpriamo published the treatise on astronomy Specula parthenopaea uranophilis juventibus excitata in 1748 for his pupils of the Neapolitan college. He reported the observations made in Europe, in China and in his travels by land and sea, calculating the ephemeris of stars and planets for the meridian of Naples.

== Works ==
- Specula Parthenopaea uranophilis juvenibus excitata (in Latin). Vol. 1. Napoli: Serafino Porsile. 1748.

== See also ==
- List of Jesuit scientists
- List of Roman Catholic scientist-clerics
- Catholic Church in China
- Jesuit China missions
- Chinese Rites controversy
