= Giovanni Antonelli =

Italian scientist, astronomer and engineer (1818–1872)

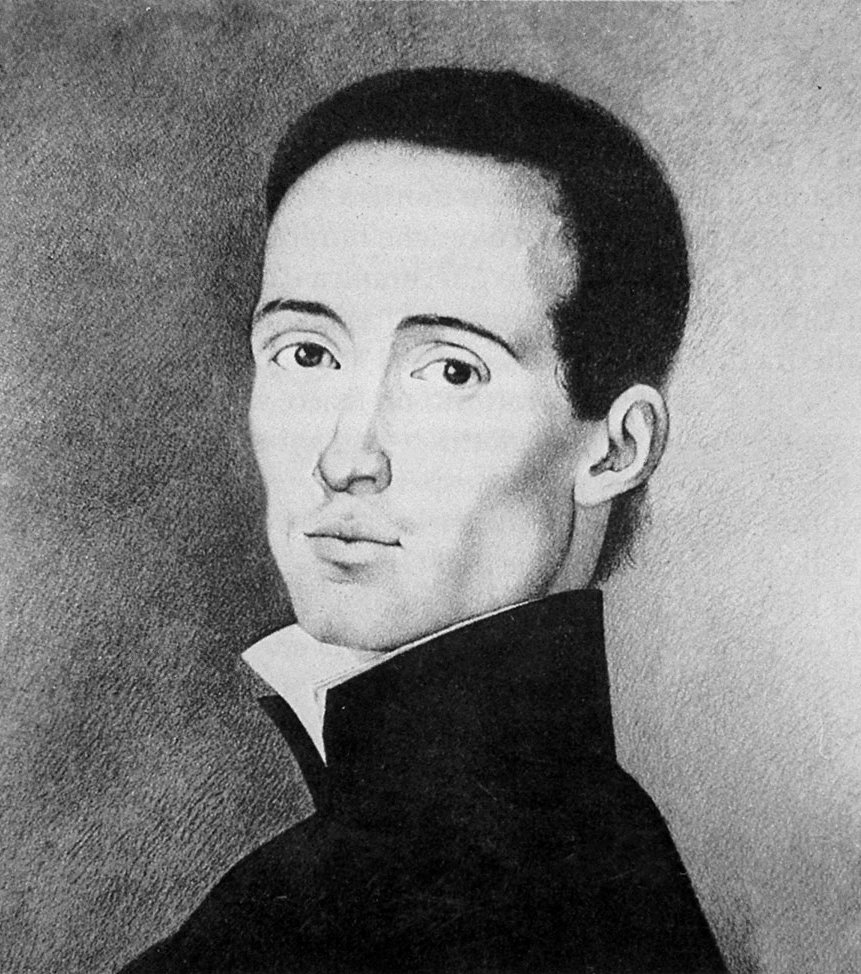
- Born: 1 October 1818; Pistoia, Tuscany, Italy
- Died: 14 January 1872 (aged 53); Florence, Italy
- Scientific career
- Fields: Astronomy

Giovanni Antonelli (1 October 1818 – 14 January 1872) was an Italian scientist, astronomer and engineer.

Antonelli was born in Pistoia, Tuscany. A Catholic priest, he was director of the Ximenian Observatory of Florence from 1851 until his death.

In 1858 he installed a lightning rod designed by himself and Filippo Cecchi on the Florence cathedral. Again with Father Cecchi, he collaborated in the design of a prototype of internal combustion engine with Eugenio Barsanti and Felice Matteucci. Father Antonelli wrote numerous treatises, concerning various arguments from astronomy to mathematics, hydraulics and others; he also published a comment to astronomical passages in the Divine Comedy.

== Works ==
- Sulle dottrine astronomiche della Divina Commedia (in Italian). Firenze: Tipografia Calasanziana. 1865.
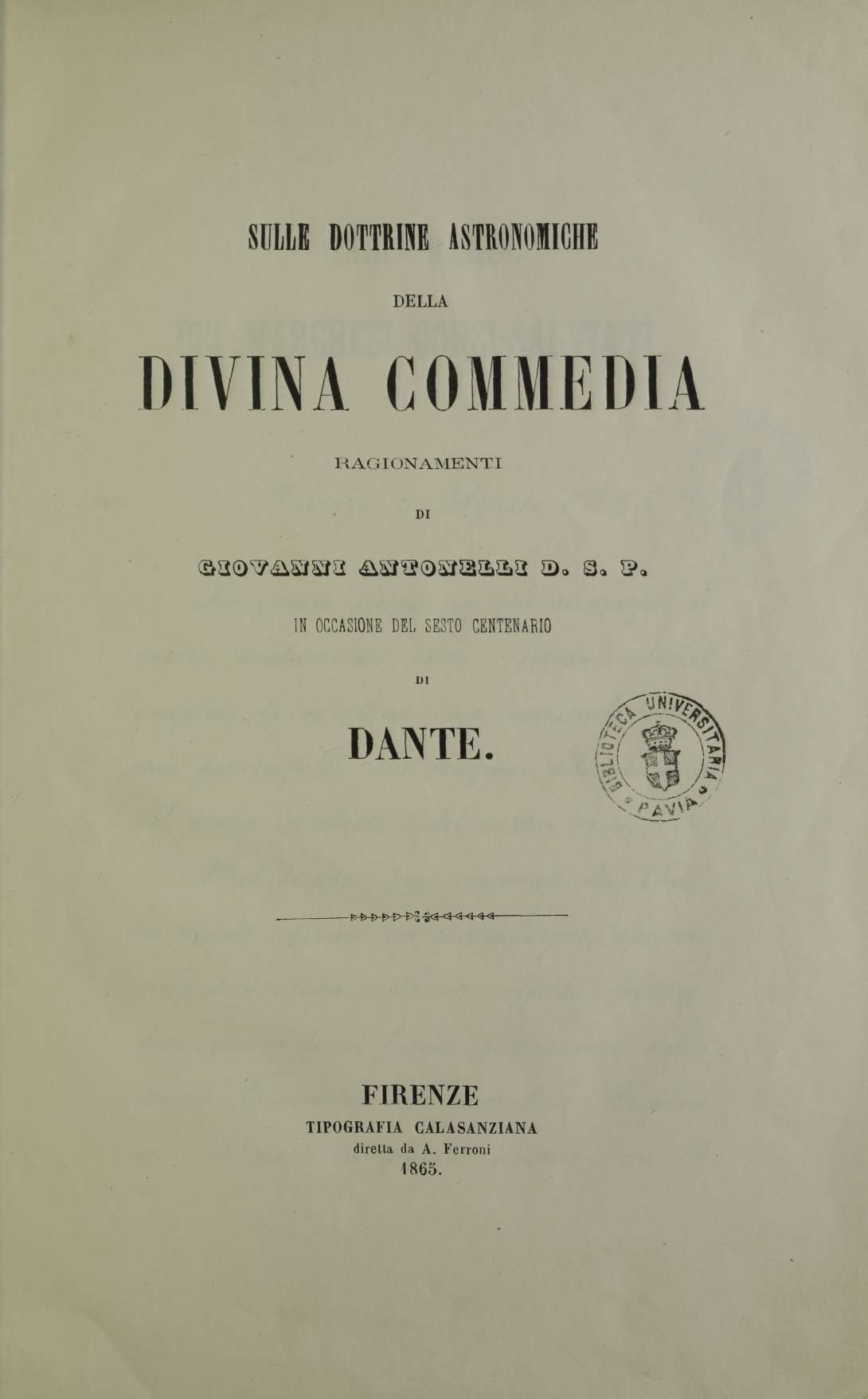
Sulle dottrine astronomiche della Divina Commedia, 1865

== See also ==
- List of Roman Catholic scientist-clerics
