= Maximus von Imhof =

German physicist

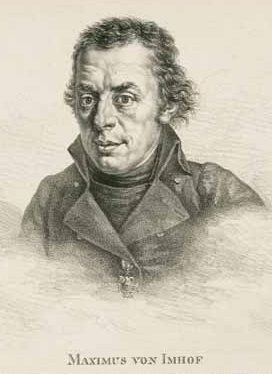
Maximus von Imhof.

Maximus Ritter von Imhof (26 July 1758 – 11 April 1817), born at Reisbach, in Bavaria, was a German physicist. He taught in the monastery in Munich from 1786 to 1791.

Catholic Encyclopedia article

== See also ==
- List of Roman Catholic scientist-clerics
