= Joseph Bayma =

Italian mathematician

Joseph Bayma (November, 1816 in Piedmont, Kingdom of Sardinia – February 7, 1892, in Santa Clara, California) was a mathematician, philosopher, and scientist. He is known for work relating to stereochemistry and mathematics.

== Life ==
He entered the Society of Jesus on February 5, 1832. He was in charge of the episcopal seminary of Bertinoro when political troubles in 1860 led to his move to England. At Stonyhurst College he took up philosophy and taught it for some seven years. This led to his producing three volumes of "Realis Philosophia." These were for private presses, and the volumes are not reliable as evidence of his mature opinions. In 1868, he left England for California. He believed technology could be abused but could improve society.

In California, he would be Rector of Saint Ignatius' College, San Francisco, for three years, and he is listed as a past president of the University of San Francisco. He resided in Santa Clara, teaching elementary mathematics there. He would work in Santa Clara until his death.

== Works ==
Bayma published a number of elementary works on mathematics:

- "Algebra" (1890),
- "Geometry" (1895)
- "Analytical Geometry" (1887)
- "Plane and Spherical Trigonometry" (1886)
- "Infinitesimal Calculus" (1889)

His other published works are:

- "Molecular Mechanics" (Cambridge, 1866)
- "The Love of Religious Perfection", originally in Italian, in the style of "The Imitation of Christ" (published in English, Dublin, 1863)
- articles in "The Catholic World", XVII–XXI (1873–75), the best printed account of his philosophy
- two articles in the "Am. Cath. Q. Rev.", II (1877)
- "A Discussion with an Infidel", being a review of Büchner's "Force and Matter" (New York, London, and Leamington, 1901).

At Bayma's death, he left behind, in manuscript, an elaborate new edition of the "Realis Philosophia", which never saw the light.

To posterity, he must be known for his "Molecular Mechanics", a metaphysical and mathematical work treating the constitution of matter. With Roger Joseph Boscovich, Bayma reduces all matter to unextended points, centres of force acting in the inverse square of the distance, thus acting upon one another, but of course not touching, for Bayma abhorred continuous matter and upheld actio in distans. These points were bound up into molecules, and molecules into bodies. Boscovich made his points, or elements, attractive at molar distances and repulsive at molecular distances. Bayma divides elements into attractive and repulsive, the former always attracting and the latter always repelling; the attractive elements preponderating in the nucleus of the molecule, the repulsive in the envelope. The work drew attention at Cambridge, and at Trinity College, Dublin. The author was advised to test his theories through ten years of experiments in chemistry and electricity. This did not occur in reality due to his death.

== See also ==
- List of Jesuit scientists
- List of Roman Catholic scientist-clerics
