= Albert of Castile =

Roman Catholic historian

Albert of Castile (c. 1460–1522) was a Roman Catholic historian.

He entered the Order of St. Dominic at an early age in the Convent of SSts. John and Paul at Venice and became skilled in nearly every department of contemporary learning. History, however, was his chief study.

== Works ==
Albert's works include:

- Catalogus Illustrium Ordinis Virorum (Venice, 1501)
- Catalogus Sanctorum a Petro de Natalibus Veneto eregione Costellana episcopo Equilino concinnatus (Venice, 1501)
- Chronica brevis ab initio ordinis usque ad praesens tempus (Venice, 1504), an account of the Popes, the Dominican Generals, and the illustrious men of the order, beginning with its foundation, drawn up chiefly from the work of the Dominican Giacomo de Luzato.

He is also the editor of the following works:

- Biblia Latina cum pleno apparatu tersissime et nitidissime impressa (Venice, 1506), which he re-edited fifteen years later with a concordance of the Old and New Testaments
- Pontificale secundum ritum Romanae Ecclesiae emendatum primum a Jacobo de Lutiis episcopo Cafacensi et Joanne Buckardo (Venice, 1520)
- Constitutiones ord. Praed., una cum adjectis ad singulos textus opportune declarationibus (Venice, 1507)
- Liber de instructione officialium venerabilis Humberti magistri ordinis V (Venice, 1507)
- Regula et privilegia Fratrum et Sororum de poenitentia impugnantes Fratres Praedicatores, quod non vivant secundum vitam apostolicam, a Jacobo de Voragine, O.P. archiepiscopo Januensi (Venice, 1504)
