= Nicholas Halma =

French mathematician and translator (1755–1828)

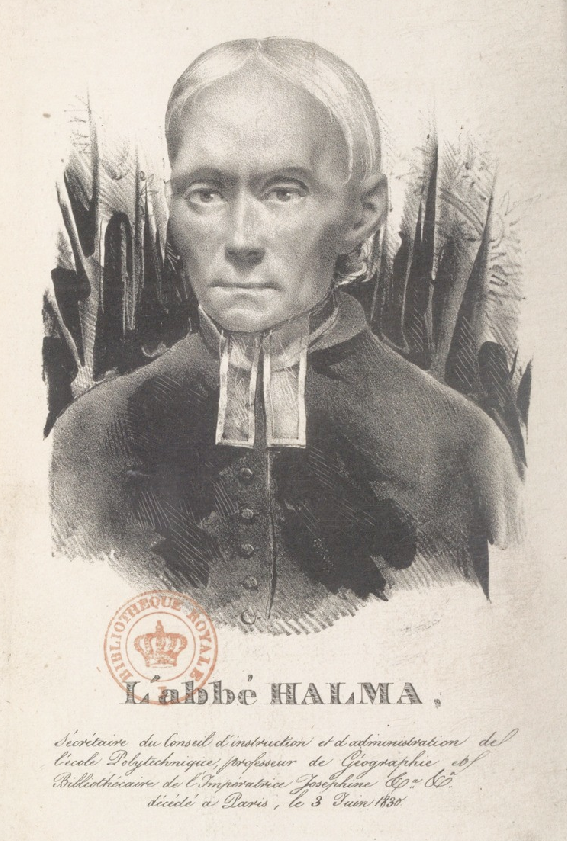
Nicholas Halma

Nicholas Halma (31 December 1755, Sedan, France – 4 June 1828, Paris) was a French mathematician and translator.

He was educated at the College of Plessis, Paris, took Holy orders, and received the title of Abbé. In 1791, he became principal of Sedan College. When this school closed in 1793, he went to Paris and entered military service as surgeon. In 1794, he was appointed secretary to the Polytechnic School. He held the chair of mathematics at the Prytanée of Paris, and then that of geography in the military school at Fontainebleau. As librarian of the Empress Josephine and of the École des Ponts et Chaussées, he was charged to instruct the empress in history and geography.

Under the Bourbon Restoration, he was appointed curator at the library of Sainte Geneviève and became a canon of Notre Dame. In 1808, he was commissioned by the minister of the interior to continue the "History of France" of Paul François Velly, and prepared the manuscript of two volumes. His most important work was the editing and the translation into Latin and French of Ptolemy's Almagest (Paris, 1813–16), a task undertaken at the instance of Joseph Louis Lagrange and Jean Baptiste Joseph Delambre. He also translated the Commentaries of Theon of Alexandria (Paris, 1822–25).

== Other works ==
- Table pascale du moine Isaac Argyre (Paris, 1825);
- Astrologie égyptienne (Paris, 1824);
- Examen historique et critique des monuments astronomiques des anciens (Paris, 1830).

== See also ==
- List of Roman Catholic scientist-clerics

== Sources ==
Attribution
