= Jean Baptiste Carnoy =

Belgian biologist

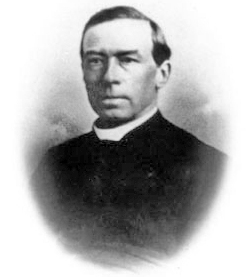
Jean Baptiste Carnoy

Jean Baptiste Carnoy (11 January 1836 – 6 September 1899), born in Rumillies (Belgium), was a Roman Catholic priest and a scientist in the field of cytology. He made the initial explanation of the real nature of the albuminoid membrane, and conducted noted experiments on cellular segmentation.

== See also ==
- List of Roman Catholic scientist-clerics
