= Gilles-François de Gottignies =

Belgian Jesuit mathematician and astronomer

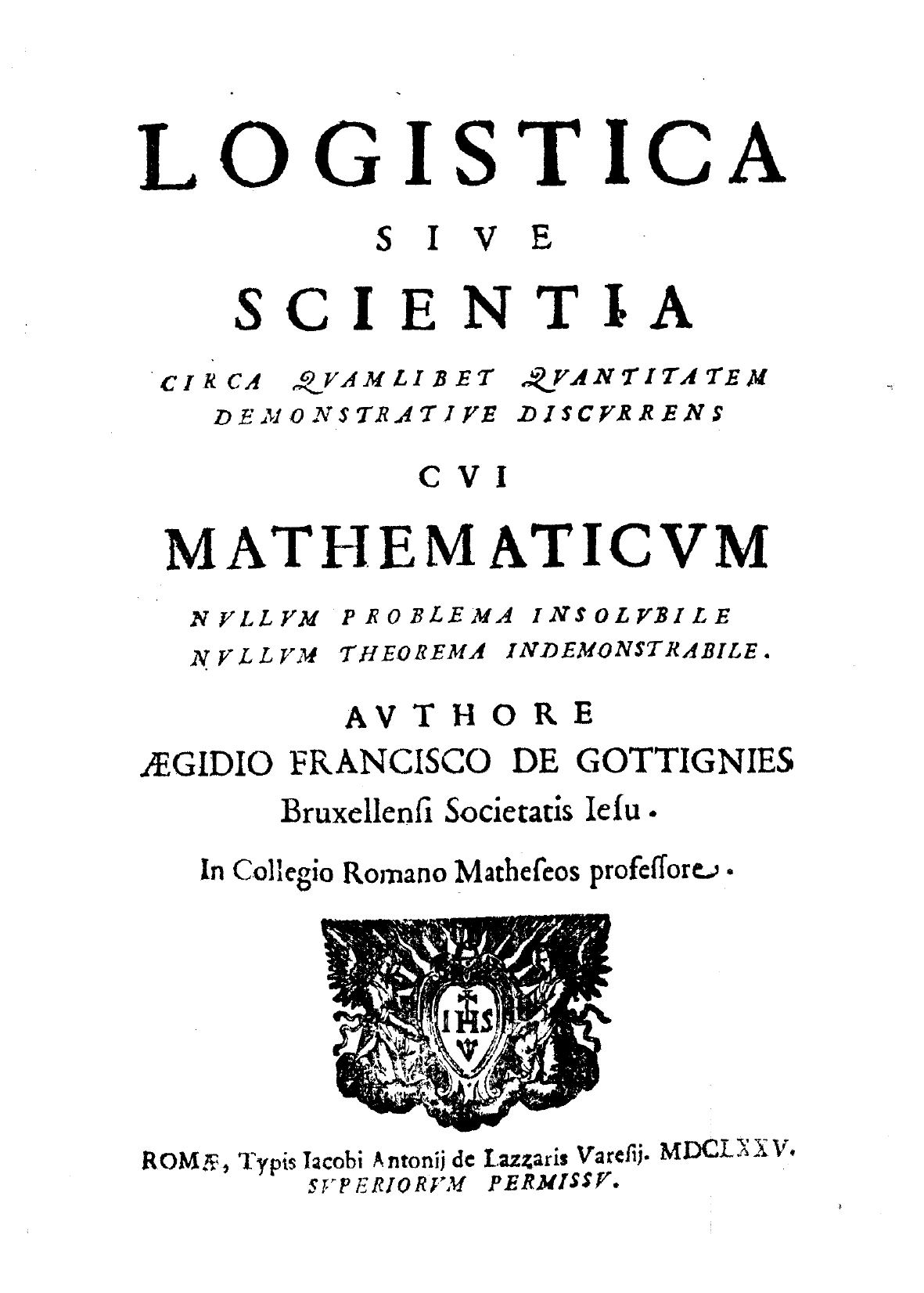
Logistica sive Scientia circa quamlibet quantitatem, 1675

Gilles-François de Gottignies (10 March 1630 – 6 April 1689) was a Belgian Jesuit mathematician and astronomer.

== Life ==
De Gottignies was born in 1630 in Brussels, but became a very active member of the scientific community in Rome, where he became professor of mathematics at the Roman College. He opposed Jean-Dominique Cassini's theory and his works were translated in French by Georges-Louis Leclerc de Buffon. He died in Rome, aged 59, in 1689.

== Works ==
- Gottignies, Gilles François (1669). Elementa geometriae planae. Romae: typis Angeli Bernabò.
- Gottignies, Gilles François (1675). Logistica sive Scientia circa quamlibet quantitatem. Romae: typis Iacobi Antonij de Lazzaris Varesij.
- Gottignies, Gilles François (1676). Arithmetica introductio ad logisticam universae mathesi servientem continens vulgo usitatam arithmeticam practicam. Romae: typis Nicolai Angeli Tinassij.
- Gottignies, Gilles François. Epistolarum mathematicarum liber primus. Romae: typis Nicolai Angeli Tinassij.
