= Antonio Neri (chemist) =

Italian chemist (1576–1614)

Antonio Ludovic Neri
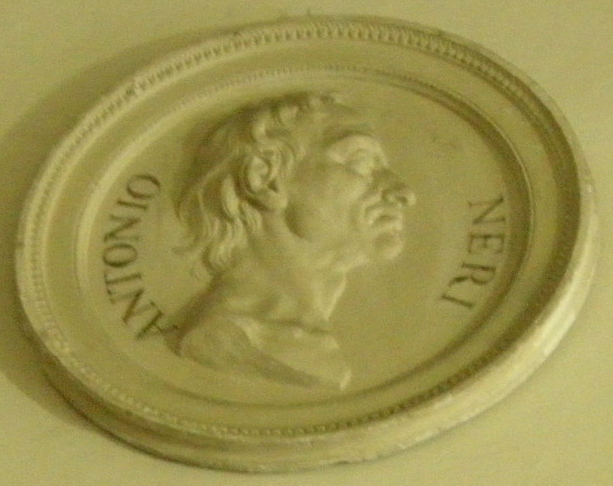
- Medallion honoring Antonio Neri
- Born: 29 February 1576; Florence, Italy
- Died: 1614 (aged 37–38) unknown location
- Occupations: Priest; Chemist; Glassmaker
- Parent(s): Jacopo Neri and Dianora Neri (née dei Parenti)

Academic work
- Discipline: Science of Glassmaking
- Notable works: Author of "The Art of Glass"

Antonio Neri (29 February 1576, Florence – 1614) was a Florentine priest who published the book L’Arte Vetraria or The Art of Glass in 1612. This book was the first general treatise on the systematics of glassmaking.

== Early life and education ==
Neri's father was a physician. Neri entered the priesthood in 1601. He then became a member of the household of Alamanno Bertolini, where he met the chemist Sir Emmanuel Ximenes, who introduced Neri to the fundamentals of glassmaking. Bertolini was a member of the Medici royal family, and his household in Florence was known as Casino di San Marco. Various glassmakers visited the Bartolini household from time-to-time, giving Neri ample opportunity to learn glassmaking and to eventually develop improved formulations.

In one account, he is known as Antonio Lodovico Neri.

== Career ==
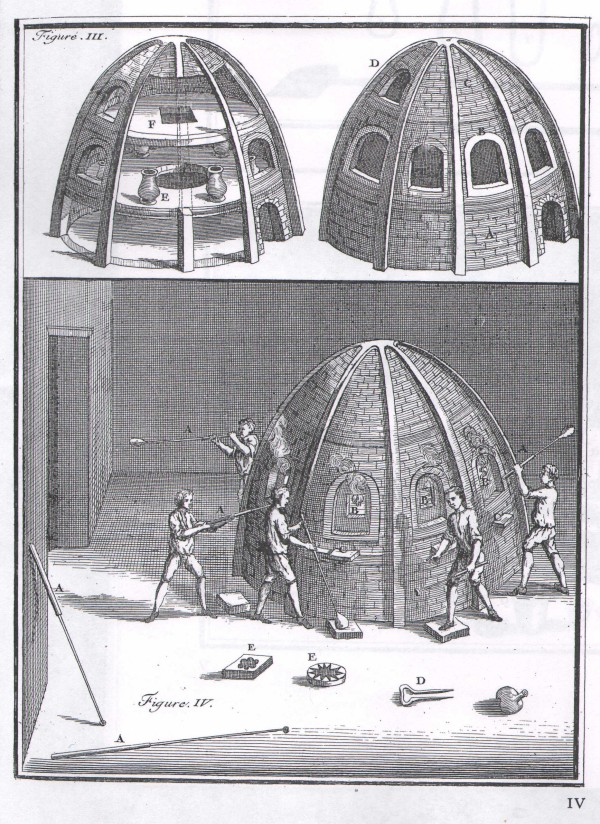
Copper engraving from Neri's L' arte vetraria (1612)

Prior to Neri's time, glassmaking was part of the field of alchemy, and Neri had a background in alchemy. Through his efforts and those of glassmaking contemporaries of Neri, glassmaking began to evolve into a systematic scientific endeavour. An example is that Neri recognized that the red colour in the red glass called "crocus martis" is due to oxidized iron.

Neri travelled extensively in Italy, Antwerp, and Holland. Much of his time in Antwerp was spent with chemist Sir Emmanuel Ximenes, from whom Neri learned much of the basic chemistry of glassmaking. Neri also worked in the glasshouses belonging to the Medici family in Florence and in Pisa. These experiences significantly deepened his knowledge of glassmaking and its underlying chemistry. Neri's other endeavours included herbalism and alchemy, in addition to glassmaking.

Much of what is known about Neri's life is based on correspondence between Neri and Ximenes in addition to research conducted by Muranese glass historian Luigi Zecchin during the 1960s. An annotated bibliography of written works by Neri has been published. Much of the correspondence between Neri and Ximenes is preserved at the Biblioteca Nazionale Centrale di Firenze.

=== Systematics of Glassmaking ===
Between 1598 and 1600, Neri published his first compilation on glassmaking, Il Tesoro del Mondo, which included some basic information on equipment and raw materials for glassmaking. He was, at the same time, conducting his own experimentation on glassmaking in the household of his Medici family patron in Florence. Following the publication of Il Tesoro del Mondo, Neri began his travels to Antwerp and Pisa, during which time he interacted more frequently with Ximenes. He returned to Florence in 1611, publishing L'Arte Vetraria the following year.

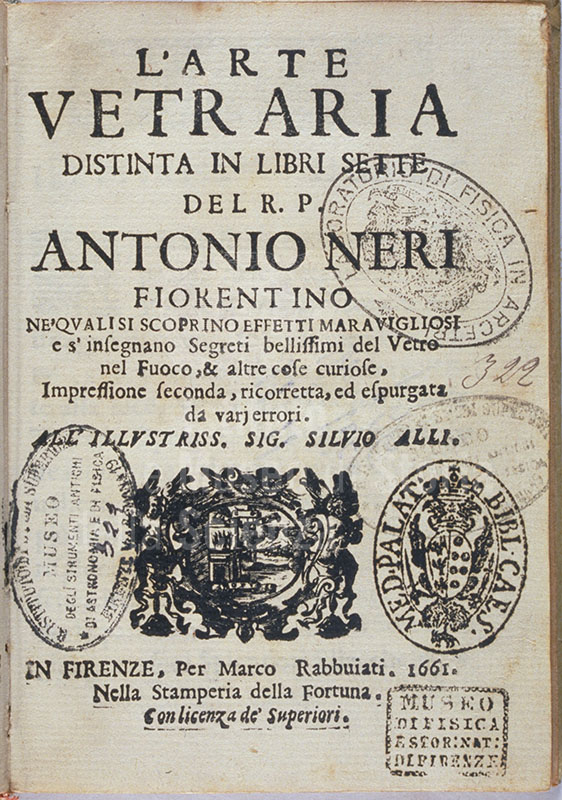
Title page from the 1662 edition of Neri's L’Arte Vetraria

In 1612, Neri published a seven-volume treatise, L' Arte Vetraria, that was a significant step toward systematizing the preparation of glass. The title of the book translates to English as The Art of Glass. The first volume describes the materials, mixing, and melting of the ingredients to produce crystals and colourless glass. Subsequent volumes describe colored glasses, leaded glass, artificial gemstones, enamels, and glass paints. The treatise includes many glass formulations that were devised by Neri by improving on formulations that he became aware of through his work in the Medici court, through his interactions with Ximenez, and likely other sources.

The contents of L'Arte Vetraria volume-by-volume are:

1. Basic glass colours and preparation
2. Chalcedony glass
3. Advanced colours
4. Lead glass and colours
5. Artificial gemstones
6. Vitreous enamel
7. Paints and transparent red glass

L'Arte Vetraria went through three editions up until 1817. By 1752, it had been translated into Dutch, French, and English.

While Neri's contemporary Galileo Galilei made note of L'Arte Vetraria, more widespread recognition of the treatise came later. In 1662, British physician and scientist Christopher Merret published an English translation of L'Arte Vetraria, which included extensive annotations by Merret. Subsequent translations were usually based on Merret's version of Neri's treatise. By 1900, there were an estimated two dozen translations based on Merret's version or on Neri's original version. The L'Arte Vetraria was a standard reference book among glassmakers up until approximately 1900 and served to enhance the ability of glassmakers to improve upon prior glassmaking processes.

== See also ==
- List of Roman Catholic scientist-clerics
