= Paolo Casati =

Italian Jesuit mathematician (1617–1707)

Reverend Paolo Casati
- Born: 23 November 1617; Piacenza, Duchy of Parma and Piacenza
- Died: 22 December 1707 (aged 90); Parma, Duchy of Parma and Piacenza
- Occupations: Mathematician; physicist
- Known for: Contributions to physics experiments and observations
- Parent(s): Lodovico Casati and Vittoria Casati (née de' Punginibbi)

Academic background
- Influences: Aristotle; Guldin; Galilei; Mersenne

Academic work
- Discipline: Mathematician, physicist
- Institutions: Roman College; University of Parma
- Notable students: Francesco Lana de Terzi
- Influenced: Schott

Paolo Casati SJ (Latin: Paulus Casatus; 23 November 1617 – 22 December 1707) was an Italian Jesuit mathematician. He belonged to the Jesuit scientific school founded in the Provincia Veneta by Giuseppe Biancani, and represented later by Niccolò Cabeo, Niccolò Zucchi, Giovanni Battista Riccioli and Francesco Maria Grimaldi.

== Biography ==
Born in Piacenza to a Milanese family, Casati joined the Jesuits in 1634. From 1636 to 1637 he studied physics and metaphysics at the College of Ferrara. One of the most famous Jesuits scientists of the time, Niccolò Cabeo (1586–1650), was teaching at Ferrara when Casati arrived there. In 1640 he moved to the Roman College, where he studied theology for four years. He was then sent to teach logic at the Jesuit college of Bologna. Bologna Jesuits had developed a strong program of experimentation, such as with falling bodies. During his time in Bologna, Casati frequented the scientific circle gathered around Giovanni Battista Riccioli and Francesco Maria Grimaldi. In Bologna Casati befriended the mathematician Giannantonio Rocca (1607-1656), a disciple of Cavalieri and one of the first Italian supporters of Cartesian philosophy. In 1650, Casati moved to Rome, where he assumed the position of professor at the Roman College. He was given the chair in mathematics after teaching philosophy and theology.

== Sweden ==
In 1651, Casati was sent on a mission to Stockholm in order to gauge the sincerity of Christina of Sweden's intention to become Catholic. He subsequently returned to his post at Rome. In 1677, he moved to the Jesuit College in Parma, where he remained until his death. Casati was a friend and correspondent of the famous florentine librarian Antonio Magliabechi, and other scientists like Carlo Rinaldini, Giovanni Antonio Rocca and Daniello Bartoli.

== Terra machinis mota ==
The astronomical work Terra machinis mota (1658) imagines a dialogue between Galileo, Paul Guldin, and Marin Mersenne on various intellectual problems of cosmology, geography, astronomy and geodesy. For example, they discuss how to determine the Earth's dimensions, floating bodies, the phenomena of capillarity, and also describe the experiment on the vacuum made by Otto von Guericke in 1654. The work is remarkable for the fact that it represents Galileo in a positive light, in a Jesuit work, only 25 years after Galileo's condemnation by the Church.

== Theories on the vacuum ==
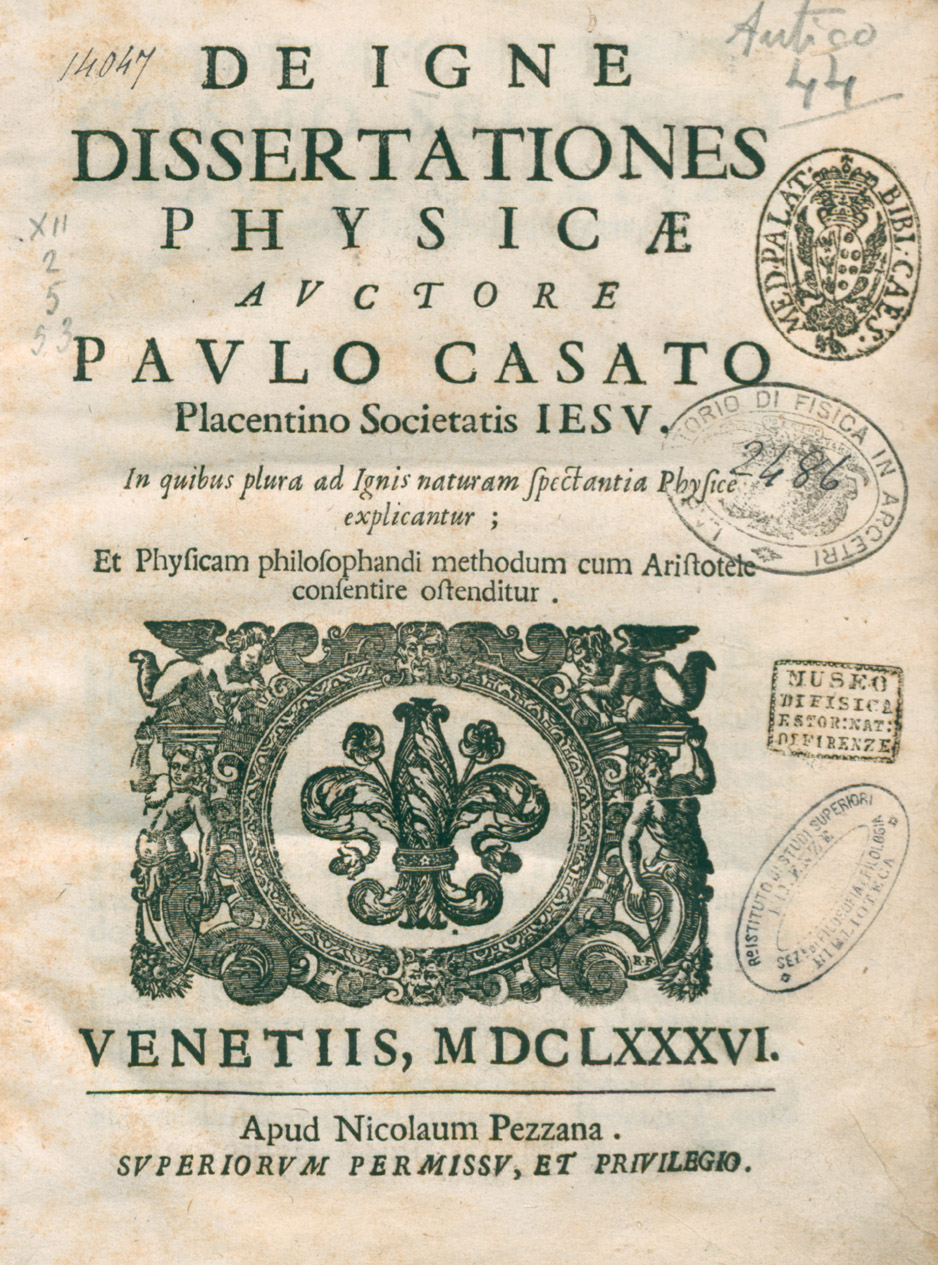
De igne, 1686

Casati discussed the hypothesis of horror vacui, that nature abhors a vacuum, in his thesis Vacuum proscriptum, published in Genoa in 1649. Casati confuted the existence of both vacuum and atmospheric pressure, but he did not rely entirely on scientific observation, and refers to Catholic thought in order to back his claims. The absence of anything implied the absence of God, and hearkened back to the void prior to the story of creation in the book of Genesis (see Vacuum: historical interpretation).

== Recognition ==
The crater Casatus on the Moon is named after him.

== Other works ==
- Fabrica et uso del compasso di proportione [A work explaining the construction and use of proportional compasses] (in Italian). Bologna: Ferroni. 1664.
- Le ceneri dell'Olimpo ventilate (1673), a dialogue about meteorology.
- De gli horologi solari (unpublished manuscript): about sundial construction.
- Mechanicorum libri octo (in Latin). Lyon: Anisson, Posuel et Rigaud. 1684.
- De igne (in Latin). Venezia: Nicolò Pezzana. 1686.
- Exercitationes matheseos candidatis exhibitaæ (1698) (unpublished manuscript): a collection of algebraic and geometrical subjects.

== See also ==
- List of Jesuit scientists
- List of Roman Catholic scientist-clerics

== Sources ==
- De Ferrari, Augusto (1978). "CASATI, Paolo". Dizionario Biografico degli Italiani (in Italian). Vol. 21: Caruso–Castelnuovo. Rome: Istituto dell'Enciclopedia Italiana. ISBN 978-88-12-00032-6.
- Gavagna, Veronica (2002). "I gesuiti e la polemica sul vuoto. Il contributo di Paolo Casati". In Gian Paolo Brizzi; Roberto Greci (eds.). In Gesuiti e università in Europa (sec. XVI-XVIII). Bologna. pp. 325–38.
- Gavagna, Veronica (2011). "Paolo Casati e la scuola galileiana". In Luigi Pepe (ed.). Galileo e la scuola galileiana nelle Università del Seicento. Bologna: CLUEB. pp. 311–26.
- Elazar, Michael; Feldhay, Rivka (2018). "Jesuit Conceptions of Impetus After Galileo: Honoré Fabri, Paolo Casati, and Francesco Eschinardi". Emergence and Expansion of Preclassical Mechanics. Boston Studies in the Philosophy and History of Science. Vol. 270. pp. 285–323. doi:10.1007/978-3-319-90345-3_10. ISBN 978-3-319-90343-9.
- Feldhay, Rivka; Even-Ezra, Ayelet (2018). "Heaviness, Lightness and Impetus in the Seventeenth Century: A Jesuit Perspective". Emergence and Expansion of Preclassical Mechanics. Boston Studies in the Philosophy and History of Science. Vol. 270. pp. 255–284. doi:10.1007/978-3-319-90345-3_9. ISBN 978-3-319-90343-9.
