= Cabeus (crater) =

Lunar impact crater

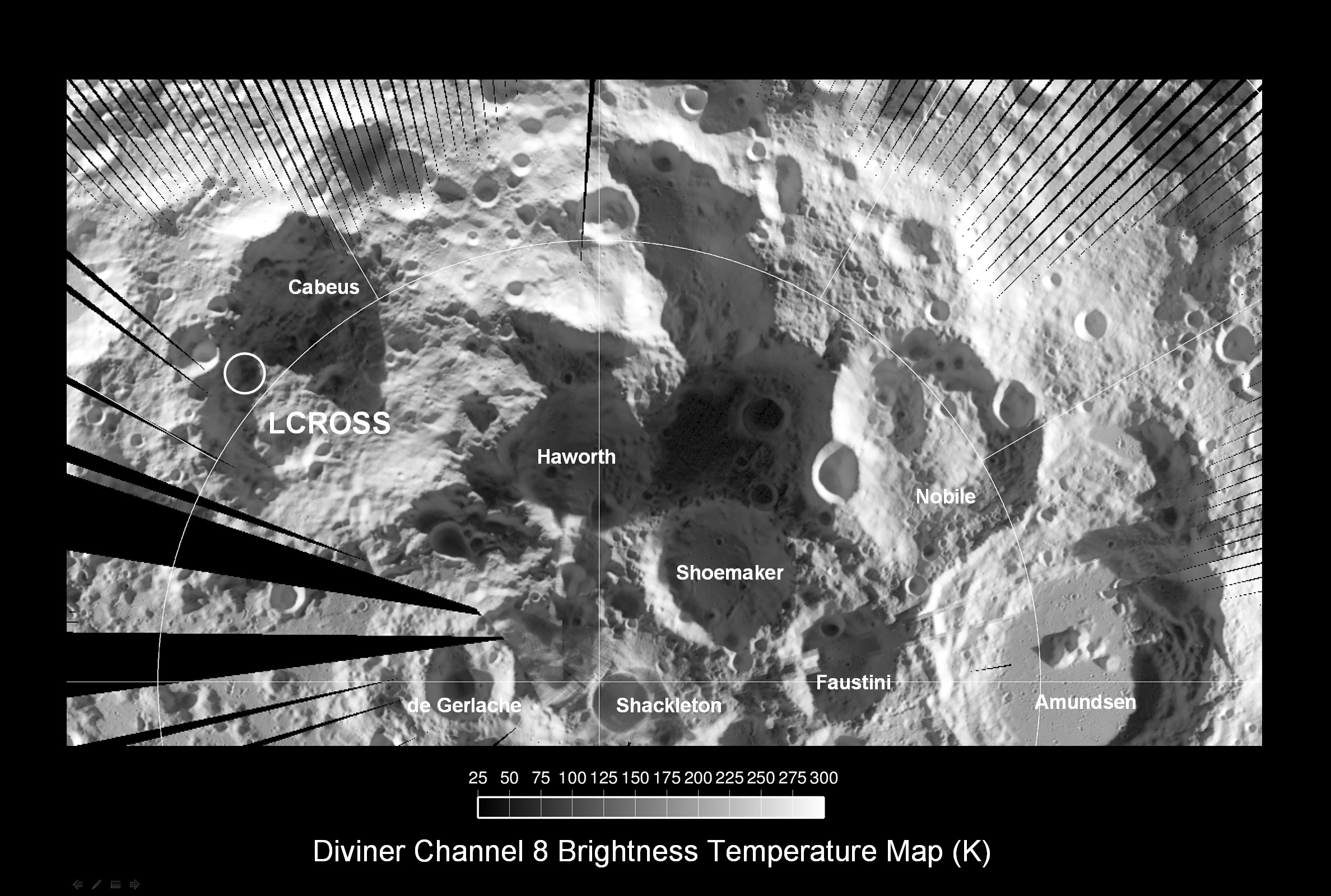
- Cabeus Crater (upper left) as imaged by the Diviner instrument on the Lunar Reconnaissance Orbiter.
- Coordinates: 84.9°S 35.5°W
- Diameter: 100.58 km (62.50 mi)
- Depth: 4 km (2.5 mi)
- Colongitude: 45° at sunrise
- Eponym: Niccolò Cabeo

Cabeus is a lunar impact crater that is located about 100 km (62 mi) from the south pole of the Moon. At this location the crater is seen obliquely from Earth, and it is almost perpetually in deep shadow due to lack of sunlight. Hence, not much detail can be seen of this crater, even from orbit. Through a telescope, this crater appears near the southern limb of the Moon, to the west of the crater Malapert and to the south-southwest of Newton. Visibility is impacted by libration effects.

== Description ==
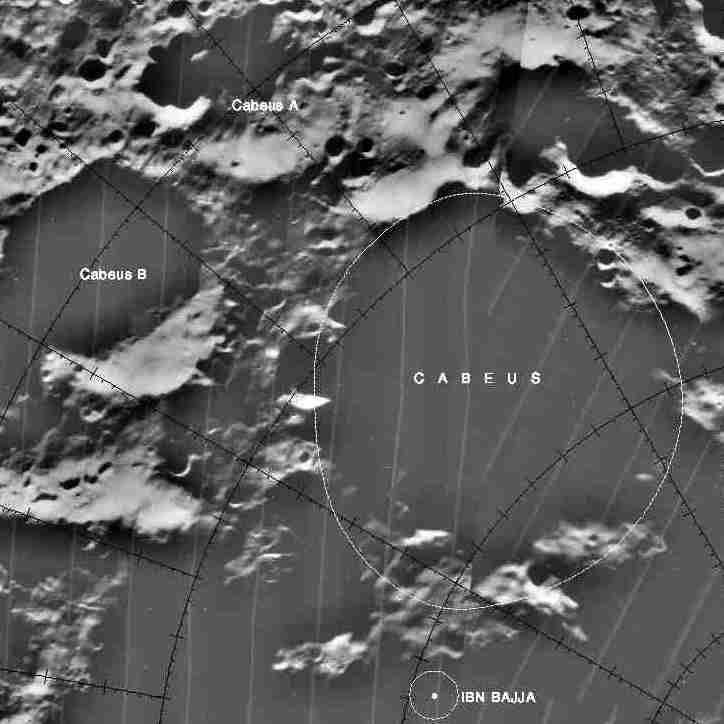
Cabeus Crater.

The crater name Cabeus first appeared in the 1651 work Almagestum Novum by Giovanni Riccioli, who named it after Italian astronomer Niccolò Cabeo (1586-1650). However, the position of the Cabeus crater was in the location later assigned to Newton crater. The official name and location for this crater was adopted by the IAU Commission 17, as established in the 1935 work Named Lunar Formations by Mary A. Blagg and Karl Müller.

This crater is a worn formation that has been eroded by subsequent impacts. The rim is eroded and uneven, with prominent ridges at the northern and southern ends. A small crater lies across the northeastern rim and there is 10–11 km crater on the interior floor near the west-southwestern rim. Near the center of the crater floor is a small ridge. The floor of the crater has an average depth of 4 km and it is 60 km across. The slope of the crater walls is 10–15°.

Because of the crater's location near the lunar south pole, the main part of the crater is illuminated by the Sun during only 25% of each lunar day. The inner walls receive illumination for 30% of a lunar day, while part of the western end of the crater is in permanent shadow.

== Volatiles ==
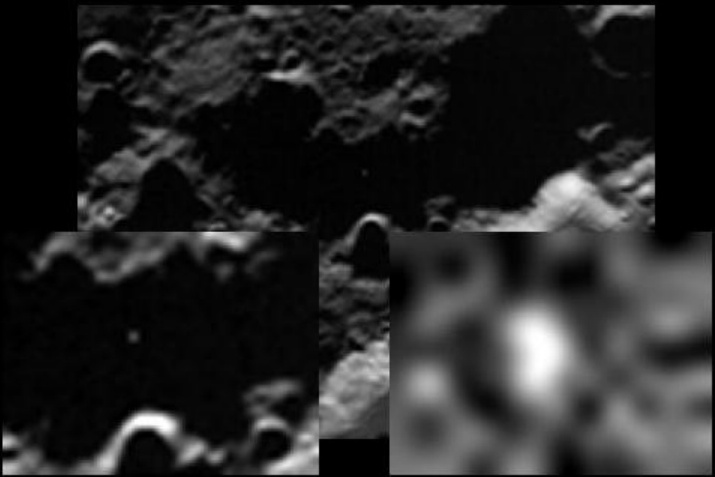
The flash from the LCROSS Centaur impact.

The south polar region of the Moon was surveyed by the Lunar Prospector spacecraft and a hydrogen signature was detected. Potential sources for this hydrogen include water deposits from comet or meteorite impacts, the solar wind or out-gassing. This crater is sufficiently large that the temperature within the shaded region is below 100 K (−173 °C). This would allow water ice to remain on or near the crater surface for billions of years without sublimating.

=== LCROSS ===
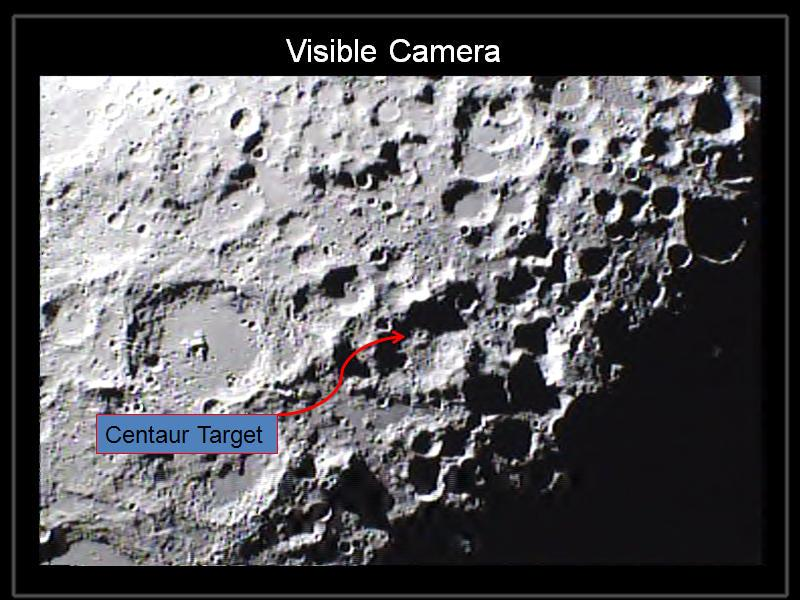
Target area of the Centaur rocket at Cabeus crater.

The United States National Aeronautics and Space Administration launched the LCROSS, impactor spacecraft on 18 June 2009, to look for water at the Lunar south pole. On 28 September 2009, Cabeus proper was selected as the impact target for the LCROSS mission, switching the target from satellite crater Cabeus A. The change was made after review of the latest data gathered by other lunar exploration craft, which indicated that Cabeus proper had a higher concentration of hydrogen than Cabeus A.

At 11:31 UTC on 9 October 2009 the Centaur upper stage of its Atlas V carrier rocket impacted Cabeus, followed shortly thereafter by the impact of the LCROSS spacecraft itself. The impact of the Centaur was intended to throw up a plume of lunar surface material to be sampled by sensors carried on the LCROSS spacecraft as it traversed the plume. But the debris plumes were smaller than predicted. Preliminary data from the LCROSS spectrometer measurements of the impact plume appeared to confirm the presence of water in the crater.

Analysis of the plume observations supports the presence of water in the regolith. Absorption in the near-infrared can be attributed to ice and water vapor, while emissions in the ultraviolet indicate the presence of hydroxyl radicals, which also supports the likelihood of water. The estimated total amount of water vapor and ice in the plume is up to 155 ± 12 kg, or an estimated 5.6 ± 2.9% by mass. The spectral signatures of other volatiles were observed, matching the signatures of carbon dioxide, light hydrocarbons, and sulfur-bearing compounds.

== Satellite craters ==
By convention these features are identified on lunar maps by placing the letter on the side of the crater midpoint that is closest to Cabeus.

Cabeus	Latitude	Longitude	Diameter
A	82.2° S	39.1° W	48 km
B	82.4° S	53.0° W	61 km
