= Casatus (crater) =

Lunar impact crater

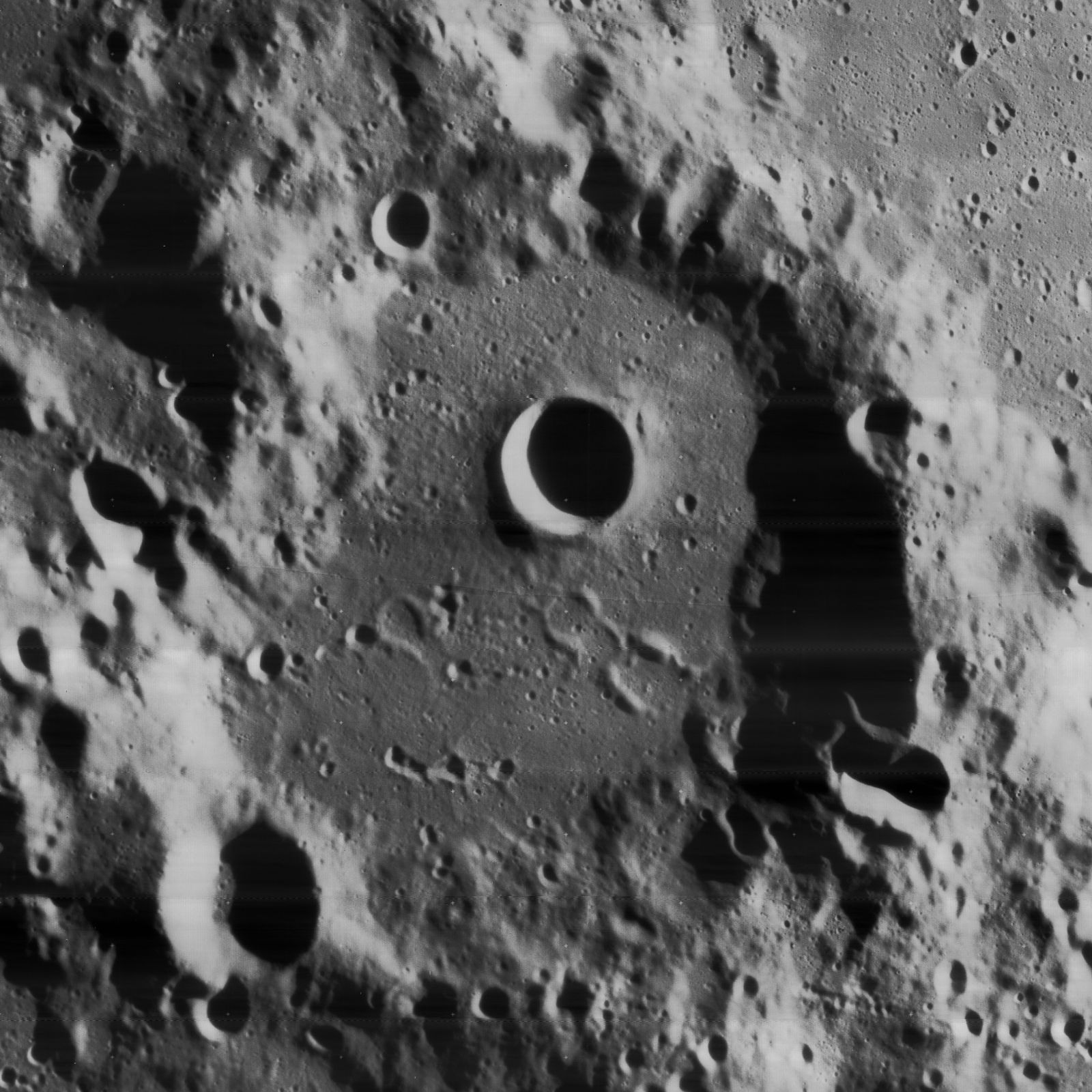
- Lunar Orbiter 4 image
- Coordinates: 72.6°S 30.5°W
- Diameter: 102.85 km (63.91 mi)
- Depth: 3.27 km (2.03 mi)
- Colongitude: 35° at sunrise
- Eponym: Paolo Casati

Casatus is a lunar impact crater that is located near the southern limb of the Moon. The north-northeast rim of the crater overlies a portion of the slightly larger crater Klaproth. Of the pair, Casatus has higher walls. Along the western rim, Casatus A intrudes somewhat into the interior, producing an inward-bowing rim. To the southeast of Casatus is Newton.

The outer rim of Casatus is old and worn, with many tiny impacts along the rim and inner wall. It reaches heights of 6,500 m along the western side and 5,500 m in the east. The small satellite crater Casatus J lies across the south-southeastern rim. The height of the rim is lower where it divides this crater from Klaproth, forming a rounded ridge.

The interior floor is a nearly level surface marked by several tiny ghost-crater rims projecting above the surface and a pair of clefts in the southern part of the floor. A small, bowl-shaped impact crater, Casatus C, forms a prominent feature in the northern half of the floor. There is no central peak formation at or near the midpoint of the interior.

This feature is named after the Italian Jesuit mathematician Paolo Casati (1617–1707). His name was added to the lunar nomenclature by Italian astronomer Giovanni Battista Riccioli in 1651. Its designation was officially adopted by the International Astronomical Union in 1935.

== Satellite craters ==
By convention these features are identified on lunar maps by placing the letter on the side of the crater midpoint that is closest to Casatus.

Casatus	Latitude	Longitude	Diameter
A	73.0° S	38.9° W	56 km
C	72.2° S	30.2° W	17 km
D	77.2° S	44.3° W	36 km
E	79.1° S	53.2° W	41 km
H	72.0° S	21.3° W	35 km
J	74.3° S	32.8° W	22 km
K	75.0° S	41.4° W	36 km
