= Klaproth =

Klaproth is a German surname. Notable people with the surname include:

- Martin Heinrich Klaproth (1743–1817), German chemist
  - Klaproth (crater), lunar crater named after Martin Heinrich Klaproth
- Julius Klaproth (1783–1835), German linguist, historian, ethnographer, author, Orientalist and explorer
- Stephan Klapproth (born 1958), a Swiss journalist and television presenter
