= Leonardo Garzoni =

Italian natural philosopher

- Born: 1543; Venice, Republic of Venice
- Died: 10 March 1592 (aged 48–49); Venice, Republic of Venice
- Occupation: Natural philosopher
- Known for: Due trattati sopra la natura, e le qualità della calamita
- Spouse: Camilla Sorian (m. 1566; died 1566)
- Scientific career
- Fields: Magnetism

Leonardo Garzoni SJ (Venice, Italy, 1543 – Venice, Italy, 10 March 1592) was a Jesuit natural philosopher.

== Life ==
The little data we have about Garzoni's life are the brief notices registered on official documents of the Society of Jesus. From these sources we know that Garzoni was born into a patrician family and that he began his philosophical studies before 1565. About 1566 he joined a congregation near to the Jesuits’ College in Brescia and entered the Society of Jesus in 1567 or 1568. In 1568 he lectured in logic in Parma and in 1573 he was a third–year student in theology in Padua. On 9 June 1579 he took his four vows in Brescia and from 1579 he lived, as a confessor, in Venice. After a stay in Verona (about 1588) he came back to Venice, where he died.

== Works ==
Garzoni's only extant work, the Due trattati sopra la natura, e le qualità della calamita, is the first known example of a modern treatment of magnetic phenomena. Written in years near 1580 and never published, the treatise had a wide diffusion. In particular, Garzoni is referred to as an expert in magnetism by Niccolò Cabeo, whose Philosophia Magnetica (1629) is just a re-adjustment of Garzoni's work. Garzoni's treatise was known also to Giovanni Battista Della Porta and William Gilbert. Even if the Jesuit is never mentioned, both Della Porta's Magia Naturalis (1589) and Gilbert's De Magnete (1600) shows a heavy dependence on Garzoni's treatise. In the case of Della Porta we are facing a blatant plagiarism, as was already remarked by Niccolò Cabeo (Philosophia Magnetica, Praefatio ad lectorem) and Niccolò Zucchi (Philosophia magnetica…, fols. 62v-63r).

=== Contents ===
The first treatise, consisting of 17 chapters, contains Garzoni's theory of magnetism. The second treatise contains the description of a number of experiments, presented as 90 conclusions or doubts, and 39 corollaries.

In the first treatise Garzoni explains the two principal magnetic effects displayed by the loadstone: its tendency to the poles and its interaction with other loadstones, or with iron. Firstly, the author ascertains that the motion towards the poles is a natural one, ascribes it to an internal mover ant its appropriate instrument, which he names the qualità delle due facce (quality of two faces). The loadstone naturally possesses the quality, or verticity, while iron can acquire it from the stone, becoming magnetized. Iron naturally possesses a similar quality, or qualità di una faccia (quality of one face), by means of which it is disposed to receive verticity from a loadstone. Once magnetized, iron behaves exactly like a loadstone. The most interesting features concerns Garzoni's description of the way verticity moves the loadstone and the way it alters surrounding bodies, virtually propagating itself outside the stone. Other interesting features arise from the explanation of double nature of the magnetic quality, and from the problem of the location of the geographical magnetical poles.

The second treatise starts with a classical experiment showing the proper alignment of the loadstone to the poles, followed by a lot of experiences about the interaction between two loadstones, between the loadstone and iron, and about the transmission of the magnetic virtue. Garzoni then considers the diffusion of the magnetic virtue inside the stone, outside it, and inside iron. These results are obtained by magnetizing bodies of different shapes and sizes. In particular, Garzoni considers the behaviour of magnetized iron dust. The behaviour of iron placed in the sphere of action of more loadstones is salso investigated. In the subsequent experiments, Garzoni studies the external diffusion of magnetic virtue by displacing a magnetic needle within the sphere of action. At every point, the direction of the needle gives the direction of the magnetic virtue. The configuration Garzoni obtains coincides with the one theorized in the first treatise (look at the accompanying diagrams displaying the lines of propagation of verticity). Garzoni then studies the behaviour of two magnetized needles, and he investigates the action of non–magnetized iron, the properties of the quality of one face and the alteration of the quality of one and two faces. Finally, he quickly mentions spontaneous magnetization and the loss of verticity.

== Bibliography ==
- Bertelli, Timoteo. “Sopra Pietro Peregrino di Maricourt e la sua epistola de magnete. Memoria Prima”, Bullettino di Bibliografia e di Storia delle scienze matematiche e fisiche I (1868), 1–32.
- Bertelli, Timoteo. “Sulla Epistola di Pietro Peregrino di Maricourt e sopra alcuni trovati e teorie magnetiche del secolo XIII. Memoria Seconda”, Ibid., 65–139 and 319–420.
- Cabeo, Niccolò. Philosophia Magnetica in qua magnetis natura penitus explicatur. Ferrariae 1629.
- Garzoni, Leonardo. Trattati della calamita, a cura di M. Ugaglia. Milano, FrancoAngeli 2005.
- Ugaglia, Monica. “The Science of Magnetism before Gilbert. Leonardo Garzoni's Treatise on the Loadstone”, Annals of Science 63 (2006), 59–84.
- Sander, Christoph. “Early-Modern Magnetism: Uncovering New Textual Links between Leonardo Garzoni SJ (1543–1592), Paolo Sarpi OSM (1552–1623), Giambattista Della Porta (1535–1615), and the Accademia dei Lincei”, Archivum Historicum Societatis Iesu 85.2 (2016), 303–63.
- Zucchi, Niccolò. Philosophia magnetica per principia propria proposita et ad prima in suo genere promota. (Roma, Biblioteca Nazionale Vittorio Emanuele II, Fondo Gesuitico 1323)
- Ugaglia, Monica (2008). "Garzoni, Leonardo S. J.". In Noretta Koertge (ed.). New Dictionary of Scientific Biography. Vol. 3. Charles Scribner's Sons. pp. 108–109.
