= Blancanus (crater) =

Lunar surface depression

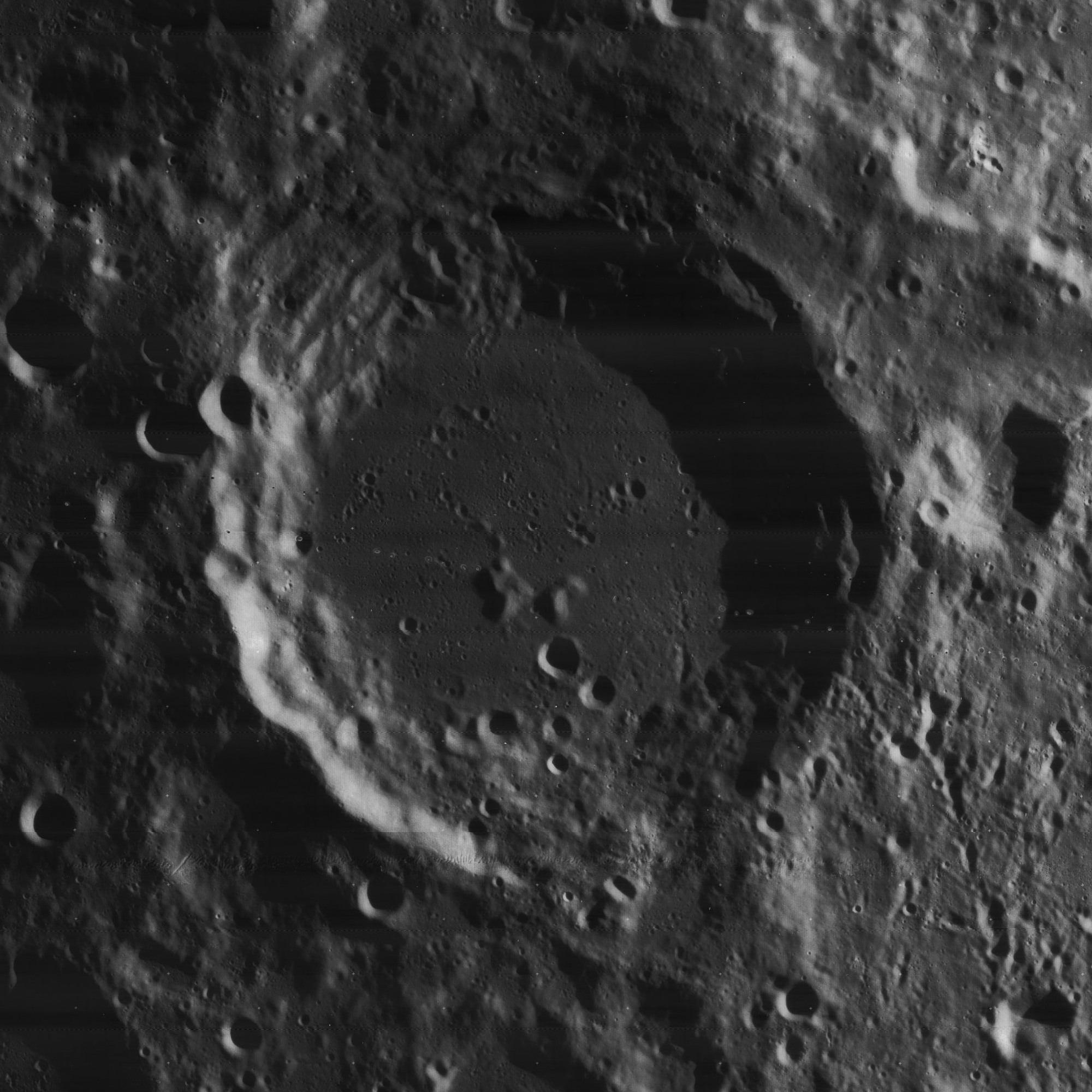
- Lunar Orbiter 4 image
- Coordinates: 63.6°S 21.5°W
- Diameter: 105.82 km
- Depth: 4.82 km
- Colongitude: 21° at sunrise
- Eponym: Giuseppe Biancani

Blancanus is a lunar impact crater located in the rugged southern region of the Moon, to the southwest of the walled plain Clavius. To the northwest lies the comparably sized crater Scheiner, and south-southwest of Blancanus is the worn Klaproth.

Overall, the crater appearance is somewhat subdued compared to a fresh impact. However, the outer rim of Blancanus is considerably less worn than that of Scheiner crater to the northwest, and the edge is still fairly well defined and it has a terraced structure on the interior. The floor is relatively flat with several low rises at the midpoint. There is a cluster of small craterlets in the southern part of the crater floor. On the exterior, there is a linear feature in the surrounding field.

This crater is named after the Italian astronomer and natural philosopher, Giuseppe Biancani (1566–1624). Its name was incorporated into lunar nomenclature by Italian astronomer Giovanni Riccioli in 1651. The crater designation was formally adopted by the International Astronomical Union in 1935.

== Satellite craters ==
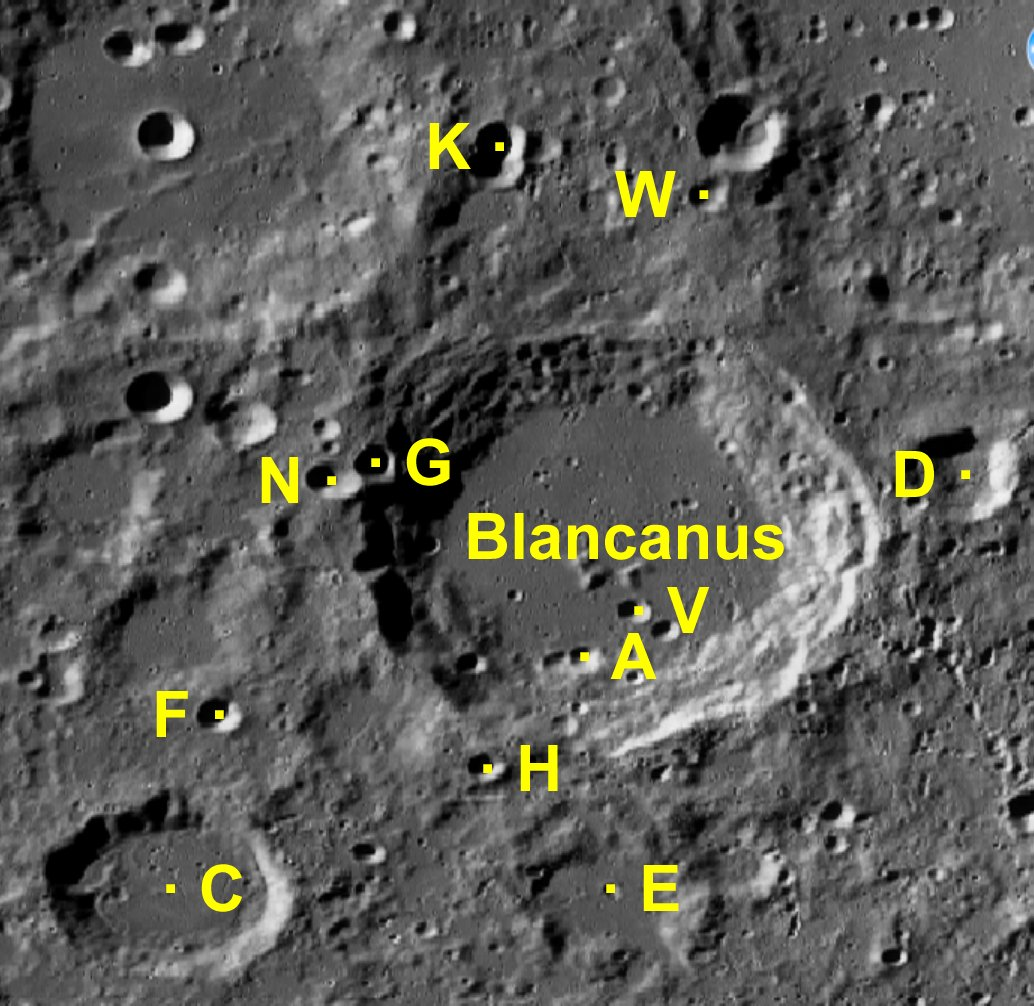
Satellite craters

By convention these features are identified on lunar maps by placing the letter on the side of the crater midpoint that is closest to Blancanus.

Blancanus	Latitude	Longitude	Diameter
A	64.4° S	21.6° W	6 km
C	66.5° S	28.0° W	46 km
D	63.3° S	16.5° W	24 km
E	66.6° S	21.5° W	37 km
F	65.1° S	27.4° W	9 km
G	63.3° S	25.3° W	9 km
H	65.5° S	23.5° W	7 km
K	60.6° S	23.3° W	11 km
N	63.4° S	25.8° W	11 km
V	64.0° S	20.9° W	7 km
W	60.9° S	20.2° W	9 km
