= Short (crater) =

Lunar surface depression

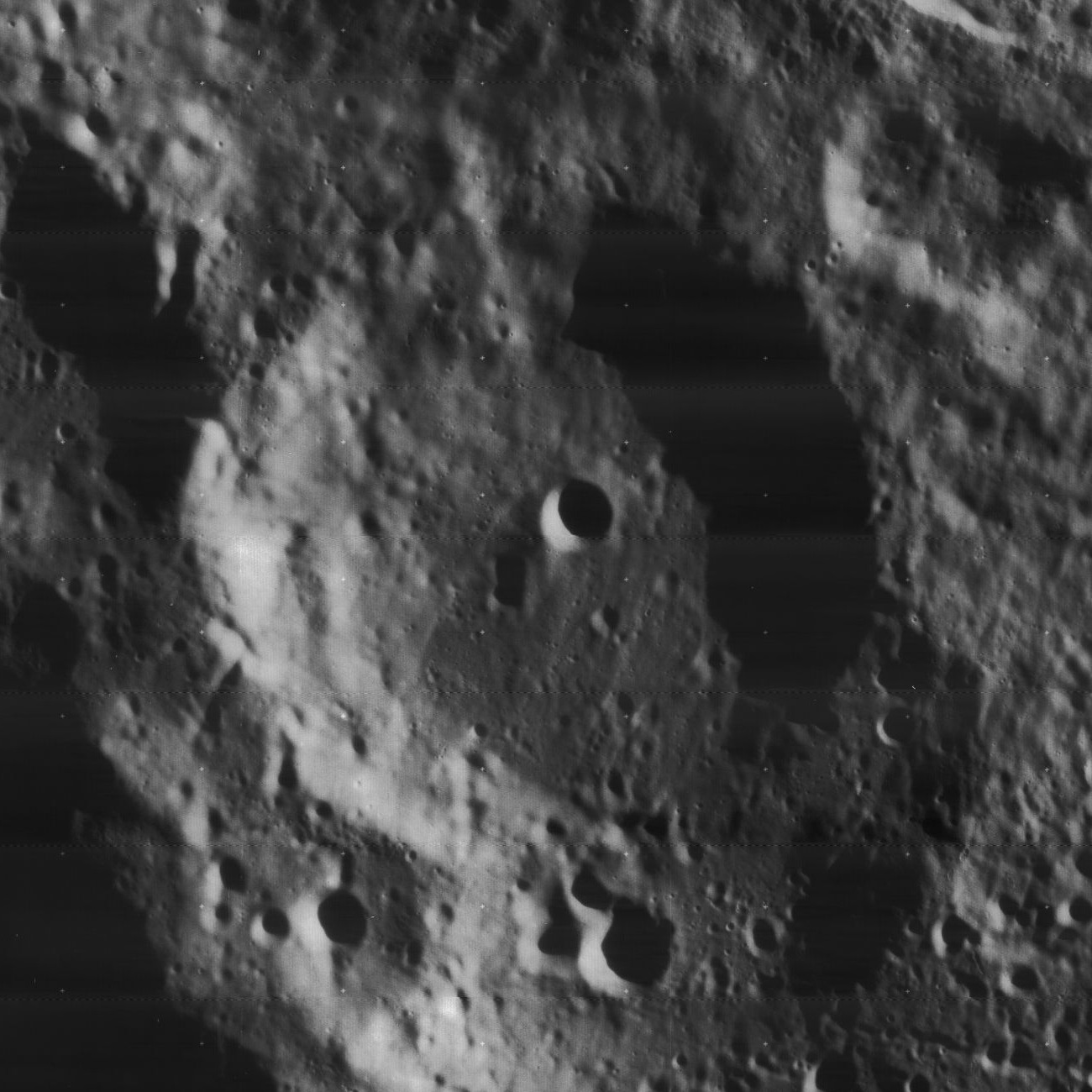
- Lunar Orbiter 4 image
- Coordinates: 74.6°S 7.3°W
- Diameter: 70 km
- Depth: 5.7 km
- Colongitude: 350° at sunrise
- Eponym: James Short

Short is a lunar impact crater that is located in the southern regions of the Moon, on the near side. It lies just to the south of the larger, prominent crater Moretus, and northeast of Newton.

This crater lies across an older crater designated Short B. Only the eroded southeastern section of the rim of Short B still survives. There is a cluster of small craters attached to the outer rim within the attached Short B.

Short itself is an eroded formation with a somewhat uneven outer rim. The inner wall is more narrow to the southeast and wider elsewhere. Several tiny craterlets lie along the rim edge, as well as the inner wall and floor. At the midpoint of the interior floor of Short is a low central rise. A small crater lies along the northeast edge of this hill.

== Satellite craters ==
By convention these features are identified on lunar maps by placing the letter on the side of the crater midpoint that is closest to Short.

Short	Latitude	Longitude	Diameter
A	76.9° S	0.5° W	34 km
B	75.5° S	5.0° W	71 km
