= Scheiner (crater) =

Lunar surface depression

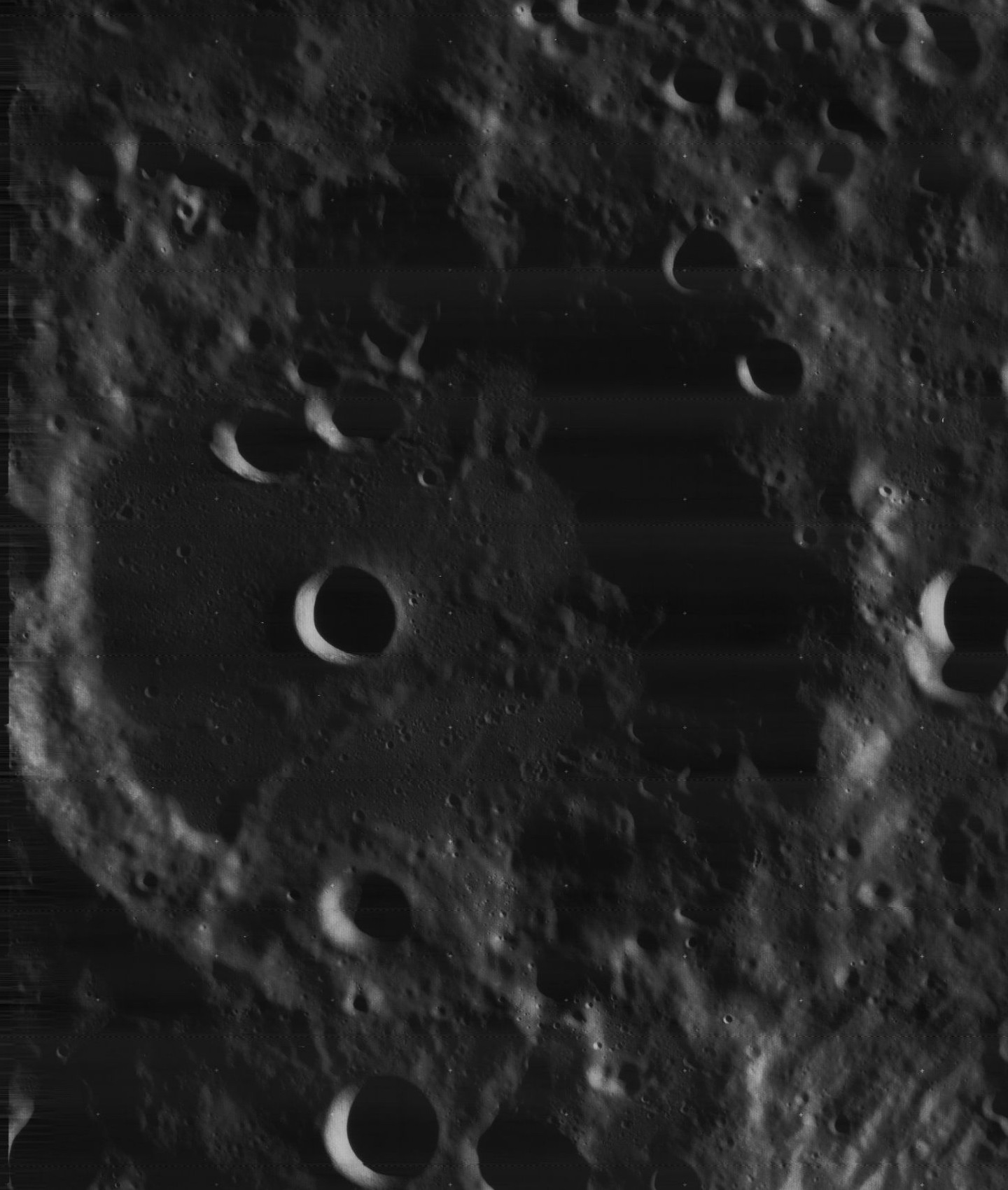
- Lunar Orbiter 4 image
- Coordinates: 60.5°S 27.8°W
- Diameter: 110 km
- Depth: 4.5 km
- Colongitude: 27° at sunrise
- Eponym: Christoph Scheiner

Scheiner is a lunar impact crater that lies to the west of Clavius, an enormous walled plain. To the southeast near the rim of Clavius is the crater Blancanus. The rim of Scheiner is worn, eroded, and marked with multiple impacts. It is most heavily worn in the northern part, where a cluster of craterlets covers the entrance to a low valley leading to the north. The floor of the crater has several craterlets, including Scheiner A that lies near the midpoint. There is also a low ridge crossing part of the eastern floor.

== Satellite craters ==
By convention these features are identified on lunar maps by placing the letter on the side of the crater midpoint that is closest to Scheiner.

Scheiner	Latitude	Longitude	Diameter
A	60.4° S	28.2° W	12 km
B	59.5° S	33.3° W	29 km
C	60.0° S	30.7° W	13 km
D	60.7° S	32.1° W	17 km
E	63.4° S	29.3° W	24 km
F	56.7° S	25.0° W	6 km
G	62.5° S	28.2° W	14 km
H	56.2° S	27.2° W	9 km
J	59.5° S	28.4° W	12 km
K	58.0° S	25.9° W	7 km
L	65.8° S	35.1° W	9 km
M	65.8° S	33.4° W	10 km
P	62.6° S	31.0° W	11 km
Q	58.7° S	29.4° W	8 km
R	58.0° S	24.2° W	8 km
S	58.4° S	25.3° W	7 km
T	60.9° S	34.8° W	12 km
U	60.9° S	36.0° W	7 km
V	60.6° S	36.7° W	5 km
W	60.3° S	37.5° W	6 km
X	59.6° S	24.8° W	7 km
Y	59.1° S	25.2° W	9 km
