= Newton (lunar crater) =

Surface depression on the Moon

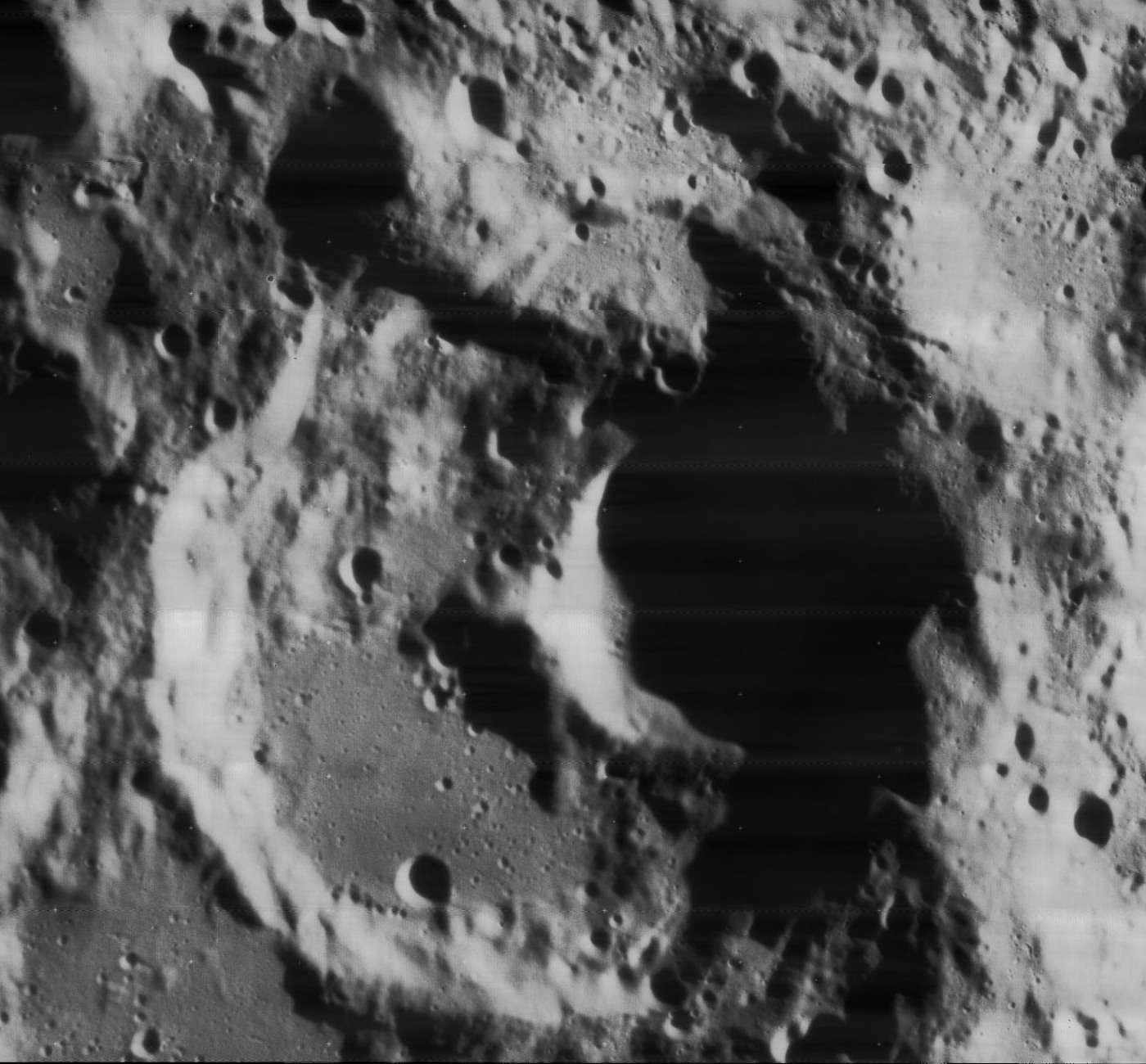
- Lunar Orbiter 4 image
- Coordinates: 76.7°S 16.9°W
- Diameter: 79 km
- Depth: 6.1 km
- Colongitude: 18° at sunrise
- Eponym: Isaac Newton

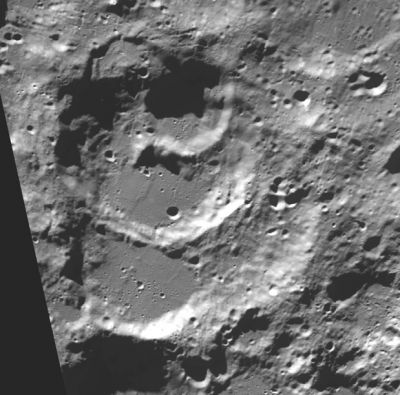
Clementine image

Newton is a lunar impact crater located near the south limb of the Moon. In 1917, British astronomer T. W. Webb described this an "an irregular crater" and the deepest known. It is south-southwest of the crater Moretus. To the northeast is Short, and in the northwest are Casatus and Klaproth. Because of its location, the crater appears highly oblong due to foreshortening. It is considered the deepest crater on the near side of the Moon.

The interior of Newton is a picture in contrasts. The southern end has been covered, possibly by lava flows or ejecta, leaving a relatively flat surface that is marked only by tiny craters and a slight wrinkle ridge down the middle. The northern half is rugged and irregular, with the satellite crater Newton D overlying the north-northeastern rim and extending across nearly half the crater diameter.

The rim in the south is relatively low and narrow, with the smaller crater Newton G partly overlain and flooded by lava. This adjacent crater forms a step up from the interior of Newton, and there is a tiny rille in the south floor of Newton where it appears as if a channel flowed down the side from Newton G. The other parts of the outer crater wall are much wider than in the south end, particularly in the areas adjacent to Newton D.

A ray from the Tycho crater crosses Clavius along a path leading toward Newton and Newton A. Secondary craters in both Newton formations were created by ejecta from the Tycho impact.

== Satellite craters ==
By convention these features are identified on lunar maps by placing the letter on the side of the crater midpoint that is closest to Newton.

Newton	Latitude	Longitude	Diameter
A	79.7° S	19.7° W	64 km
B	81.1° S	15.4° W	44 km
C	74.8° S	14.4° W	35 km
D	75.9° S	14.8° W	37 km
E	79.8° S	36.9° W	17 km
F	72.2° S	16.1° W	7 km
G	78.2° S	18.3° W	67 km
