= Niccolò Cabeo =

Italian Jesuit philosopher, theologian, engineer and mathematician

Reverend Niccolò Cabeo
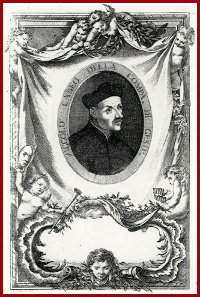
- Niccolò Cabeo
- Born: February 26, 1586; Ferrara, Duchy of Ferrara
- Died: June 30, 1650 (aged 64); Genoa, Republic of Genoa
- Occupations: Theologian; Engineer; Mathematician
- Known for: his contributions to physics experiments and observations

Academic background
- Doctoral advisor: Giuseppe Biancani
- Influences: Aristotle; Maricourt; Paracelsus; Porta; Garzoni; Gilbert; Libavius; Baliani

Academic work
- Discipline: Physicist, Astronomer, Chemist
- Influenced: Riccioli; Kircher

Niccolò Cabeo, SJ (also known as Nicolaus Cabeus; February 26, 1586 – June 30, 1650) was an Italian Jesuit philosopher, theologian, engineer and mathematician.

== Biography ==
He was born in Ferrara in 1586, and was educated at the Jesuit college in Parma beginning in 1602. He passed the next two years in Padua and spent 1606–07 studying in Piacenza before completing three years (1607–10) of study in philosophy at Parma. He spent another four years (1612–1616) studying theology in Parma and another year’s apprenticeship at Mantua. He then taught theology and mathematics in Parma, then in 1622 he became a preacher. For a time he received patronage of the Dukes of Mantua and the Este in Ferrara. During this time he was involved in hydraulics projects. He would later return to teach mathematics again in Genoa, the city where he would die in 1650.

He is noted for his contributions to physics experiments and observations. He observed the experiments of Giovanni Battista Baliani regarding falling objects, and he wrote about these experiments noting that two different objects fall in the same amount of time regardless of the medium. He also performed experiments with pendulums and observed that an electrically charged body can attract non-electrified objects. He also noted that two charged objects repelled each other.

His observations were published in the works, Philosophia magnetica (1629) and In quatuor libros meteorologicorum Aristotelis commentaria (1646). The first of these works examined the cause of the Earth's magnetism and was devoted to a study of the work of William Gilbert. Cabeo thought the Earth immobile, and so did not accept its motion as the cause of the magnetic field. Cabeo described electrical attraction in terms of electrical effluvia, released by rubbing certain materials together. These effluvia pushed into the surrounding air displacing it. When the air returned to its original location, it carried light bodies along with it making them move towards the attractive material. Both Accademia del Cimento and Robert Boyle performed experiments with vacuums in attempts to confirm or refute Cabeo's ideas.

Cabeo's second publication was a commentary on Aristotle's Meteorology. In this work, he carefully examined a number of ideas proposed by Galileo Galilei, including the motion of the earth and the law of falling bodies. Cabeo was opposed to Galileo's theories. Cabeo also discussed the theory of water flow proposed by Galileo's student, Benedetto Castelli. He and Castelli were involved over a dispute in northern Italy about the rerouting of the Reno River. The people of Ferrara were on one side of the dispute and Cabeo was their advocate. Castelli favored the other side of the dispute and was acting as an agent of the Pope, Urban VIII. Cabeo also discussed some ideas about alchemy in this book.

The crater Cabeus on the Moon is named after him. The LCROSS project discovered evidence of water in Cabeus crater in October 2009.

== Publications ==
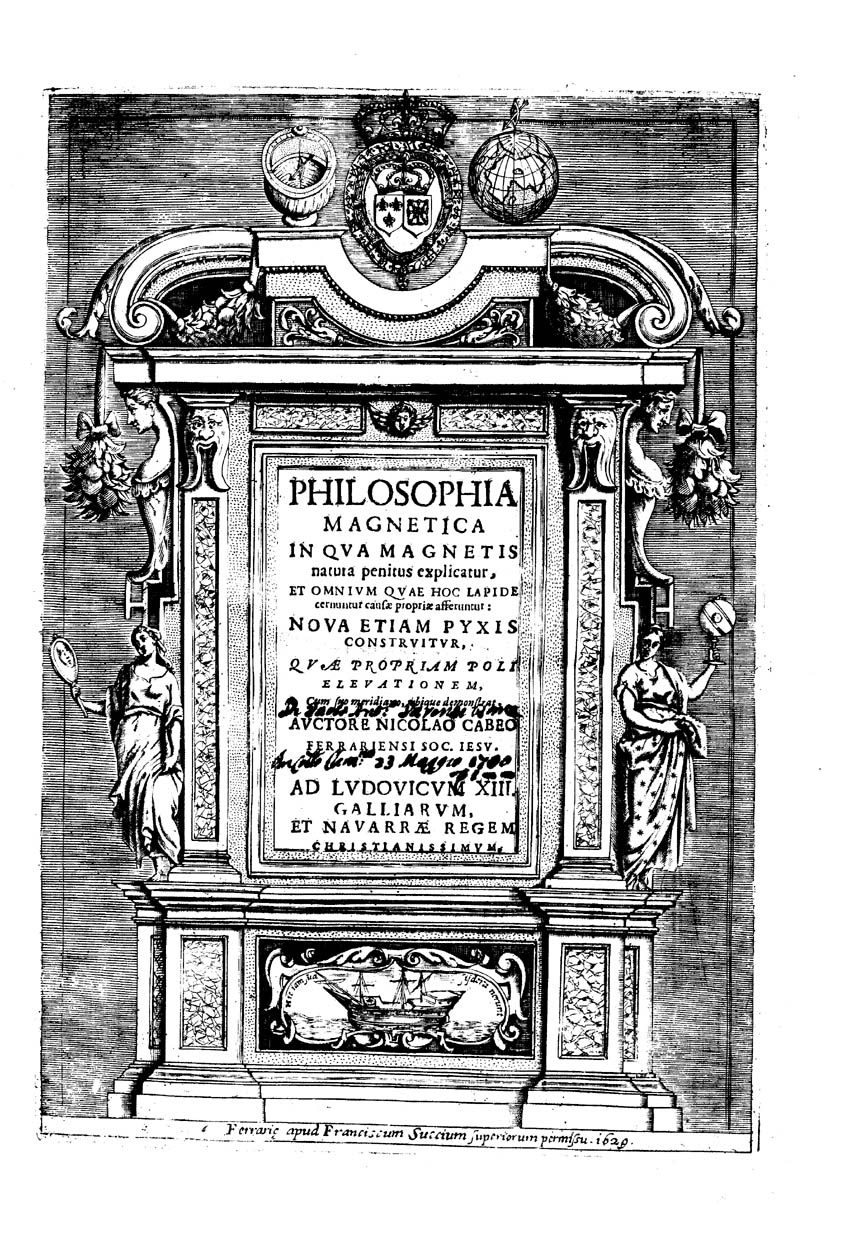
Philosophia magnetica, 1629

- Philosophia magnetica (in Latin). Ferrara: Francesco Suzzi. 1629.
- Philosophia experimentalis (in Latin). Vol. 1. Roma: Giuseppe Dondini. 1686.
- Philosophia experimentalis (in Latin). Vol. 2. Roma: Giuseppe Dondini. 1686.
- Philosophia experimentalis (in Latin). Vol. 3. Roma: Giuseppe Dondini. 1686.
- Philosophia experimentalis (in Latin). Vol. 4. Roma: Giuseppe Dondini. 1686.

== See also ==
- History of geomagnetism
- List of Roman Catholic scientist-clerics
