= Verticity =

In the history of physics, verticity (Latin: verticitate) is an alleged tendency to move around or toward the North or South Pole, often called Earth's "vertices".

In his acclaimed 1600 treatise On the Magnet and Magnetick Bodies, and on That Great Magnet the Earth, William Gilbert distinguished two kinds of verticity. Surface verticity is the tendency to point north found in ordinary "loadstones" and magnetised iron. This verticity was the weaker expression of a more powerful kind of verticity: the deep verticity in the Earth's core. Gilbert was among the first to believe that the Earth spins. It spins, he says, because of its deep verticity. In his judgement, deep verticity also explained surface verticity: over time, bits and pieces of matter escaped from Earth's core, their verticity having been corrupted and weakened by exposure to the degraded matter of Earth's crust. These bits of matter became the variety of weak magnets found nearer the Earth's surface.

Gilbert's theory of magnetism did not persuade Francis Bacon. For him, the Earth did not spin, and it had no deep verticity or magnetism. Its core was cold, passive, and unmoving, as Telesio had said. Bacon explained ordinary magnets in a different way. Their motion was westward motion around Earth's vertices. Such motion could be found everywhere. The Atlantic Ocean rolled westward and ricocheted off the eastern coast of the New World, creating the tides. The planets, stars, sun and moon too migrated westward. The stirrings of magnets could not be blamed on a special force, but only on the impulse of nearly all things to go west.
