= Klaproth (crater) =

Lunar surface depression

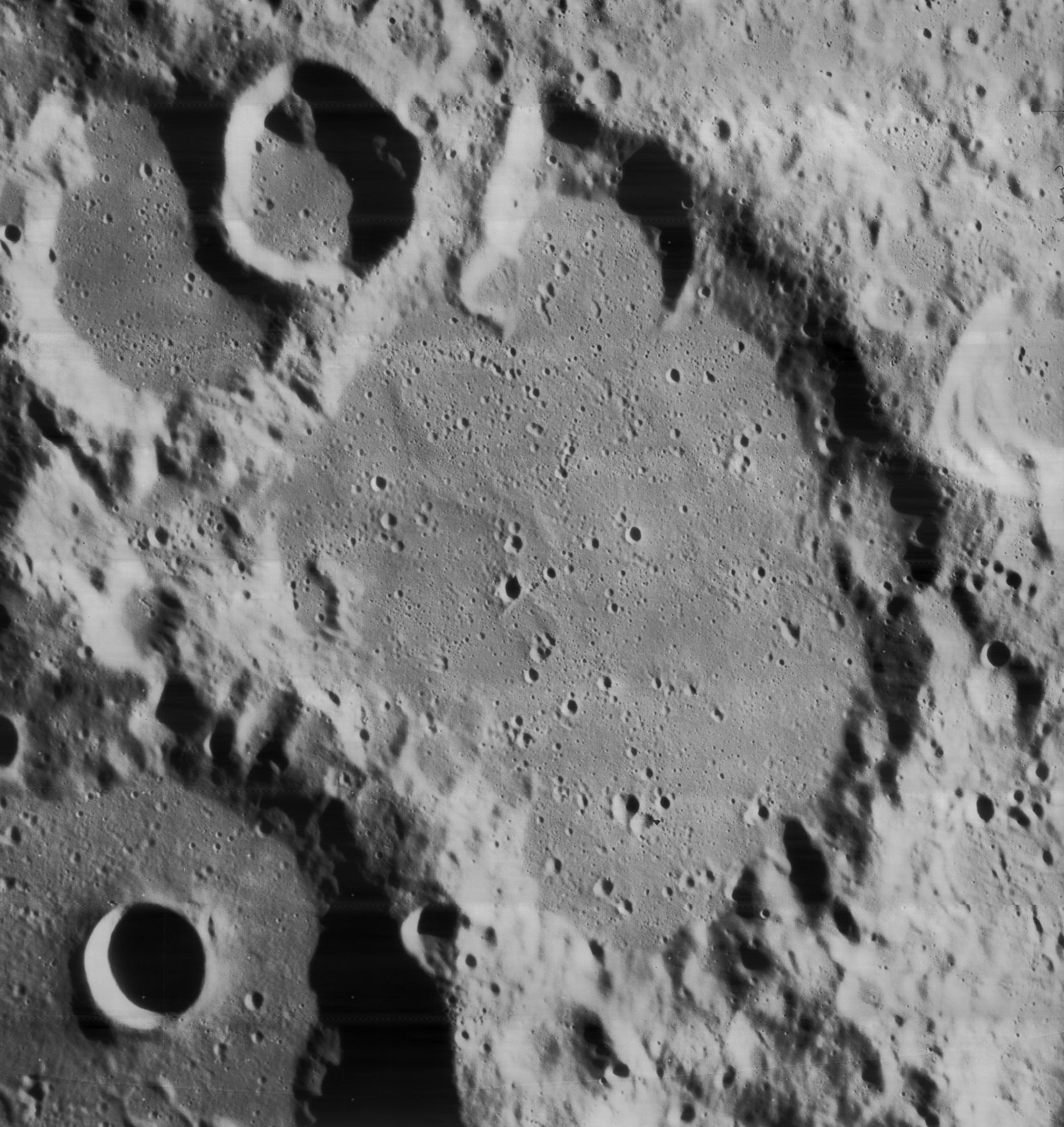
- Lunar Orbiter 4 image
- Coordinates: 69.7°S 26.0°W
- Diameter: 119 km
- Depth: 3.1 km
- Colongitude: 30° at sunrise
- Eponym: Martin H. Klaproth

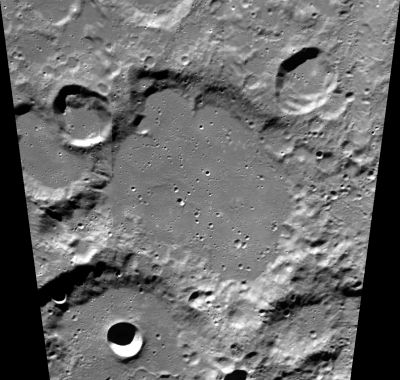
Clementine image

Klaproth is an old lunar impact crater that lies in the rugged southern highlands of the Moon's near side. Due to its location, this crater appears significantly foreshortened when viewed from the Earth. The southern rim of the crater is overlain by the similar-sized crater Casatus, and to the north-northeast lies Blancanus.

The outer rim of Klaproth has been deeply eroded, incised, and reshaped by a long history of bombardment. The rim to the north and east remains relatively circular, but the original rim along the western face has been overlain by satellite craters Klaproth G and Klaproth H, and other impacts. To the south the crater Casatus significantly intrudes into the interior floor. The remaining floor has been resurfaced by some material in the past, possibly fluidized ejecta or lava, leaving a level and nearly featureless surface that is marked only by a multitude of tiny craterlets. If this walled plain once possessed a central peak, it no longer exists.

The crater was named after Martin Heinrich Klaproth, the German chemist and discoverer of Uranium.

== Satellite craters ==
By convention these features are identified on lunar maps by placing the letter on the side of the crater midpoint that is closest to Klaproth.

Klaproth	Latitude	Longitude	Diameter
A	68.2° S	21.6° W	30 km
B	72.0° S	24.7° W	11 km
C	69.1° S	19.5° W	8 km
D	70.2° S	20.4° W	8 km
G	68.6° S	31.2° W	30 km
H	69.4° S	33.1° W	41 km
L	70.1° S	36.5° W	11 km
