= Mondsee =

Mondsee may refer to:

- Mondsee (lake), Austria
- Mondsee (town), Austria
  - Mondsee Abbey
- Mondsee group, a Neolithic Austrian culture

== See also ==
- Mondsee Gospel of Matthew, an early medieval manuscript fragment
