= Dilettanten-Theaterverein 1812 Kremsmünster =

Austrian theatre club

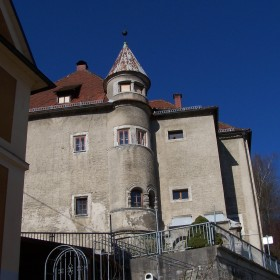
- Theatre facade in 2007

- Location in Austria
- Address: Margelikweg 2 Kremsmünster; Austria
- Coordinates: 48.053193°N 14.126794°E

Construction
- Opened: 1812
- Years active: 1812–present

Website
- link

Dilettanten-Theaterverein 1812 Kremsmünster is a theatre located in the town of Kremsmünster in Kirchdorf an der Krems (district), in Upper Austria, Austria.
