= Kremsmünster =

- Municipality
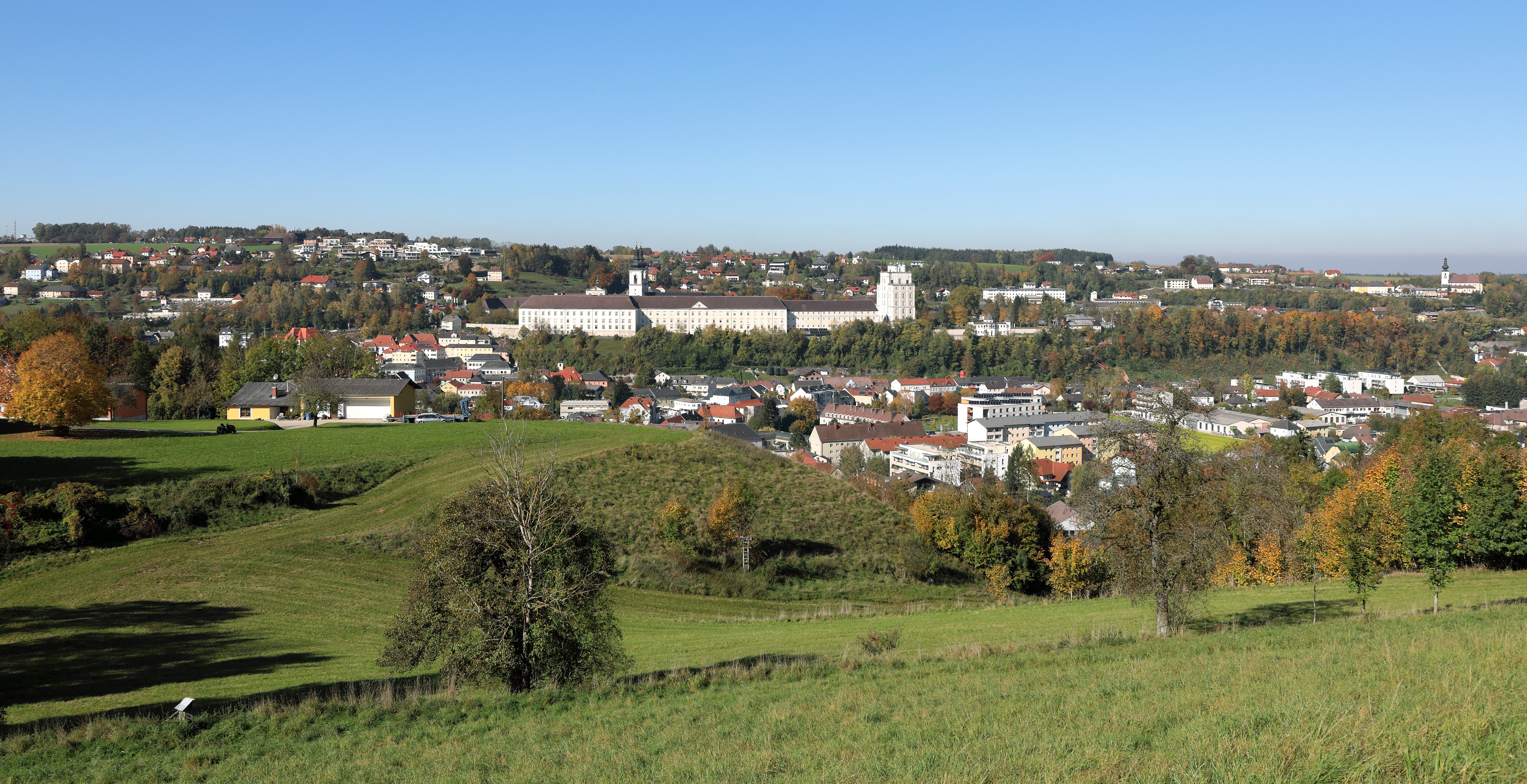

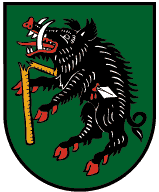
- Coat of arms

- Location within Austria
- Coordinates: 48°03′18″N 14°07′51″E
- Country: Austria
- State: Upper Austria
- District: Kirchdorf an der Krems

Government
  - Mayor: Gerhard Obernberger (ÖVP)

Area
  - Total: 42.12 km^{2} (16.26 sq mi)
- Elevation: 384 m (1,260 ft)

Population (2018-01-01)
  - Total: 6,585
  - Density: 156.3/km^{2} (404.9/sq mi)
- Time zone: UTC+1 (CET)
  - Summer (DST): UTC+2 (CEST)
- Postal code: 4550
- Area code: 07583
- Vehicle registration: KI
- Website: www.kremsmuenster.at

Kremsmünster is a town in Kirchdorf an der Krems District, in the Austrian state of Upper Austria. Settled in 777, it is home to the Kremsmünster Abbey.

The Abbey was founded 777 by Duke Tassilo III of Bavaria and is one of the oldest abbeys of central Europe. On a striking ice-age terrace above the town, it dominates the whole Krems valley. The monks (Order of Saint Benedict), lead a famous gymnasium which has existed since 1549, and an astronomical and geophysical observatory ("Mathematical tower"). The First Slovak Republic ceased to exist here when the exiled Slovak government capitulated to General Walton Walker leading the XX Corps of the 3rd US Army on 8 May 1945.

== Science and culture ==
Kremsmünster is a traditional place of culture, astronomy and natural science. For instance, Placidus Fixlmillner (1721–1791), the first astronomer to compute the orbit of Uranus, was born and lived in Kremsmünster.

The observation tower itself (built 1749–1756) represents the first high-rise of Europe. In this vicinity the eldest geomagnetism station of the world was established, and also the first weather station of Austria-Hungary.

The nearby Gusterberg (450 m) is the fundamental point of the former national survey of Upper Austria. An observation tower at the summit marks the geoscientific importance of the mountain. It is also crossed by the Meridian arc Großenhain-Kremsmünster-Pola, an 800 km triangulation which was measured in the 19th century to determine the alpine curvature of the geoid.

Besides schools and the baroque library, Kremsmünster also has some institutions of adult education, e.g. Subiaco for Spiritual Exercises and a Vocational school. The castle Kremsegg houses a special museum of music instruments.

The monastery library (built 1680–1689 by Carlone) contains about 160,000 volumes. Among the 1,700 manuscripts is the Codex Millenarius, a Gospel Book written around 800 in Mondsee Abbey.
The showpiece of the monastery's treasury is the Tassilo Chalice of about 770, created in copper and silver and holding 1.8 litres. It is still used in religious services, e.g. at Easter.

Architecture outside the monastery:

- Gothic architecture: late gothic houses, gothic judge and city hall
- Baroque: pilgrimage church Heiligenkreuz (1687–90, C.A. Carlone); Kalvarienberg (1736–38, J.M. Prunner/ B. Altomonte)
- Rococo: filial church at Kirchberg (1753/54)
- Castles: de:Schloss Kremsegg and Schloss Achleiten/Kematen

== Climate ==
The Climate of Kremsmünster is continental, classified as Dfb in Köppen climate classification and Dc in Trewartha climate classification. The weather is warm and wet during summers and cold and snowy during winters.

Kremsmünster's climate in the 1991-2020 period has been warmer and wetter than the 1961-1990 period.

Climate data for Kremsmünster(1991-2020, Extremes 1961-2020)
Month	Jan	Feb	Mar	Apr	May	Jun	Jul	Aug	Sep	Oct	Nov	Dec	Year
Record high °C (°F)	18.1 (64.6)	20.3 (68.5)	23.7 (74.7)	30.7 (87.3)	31.7 (89.1)	36.0 (96.8)	36.3 (97.3)	36.4 (97.5)	34.6 (94.3)	26.3 (79.3)	23.6 (74.5)	14.5 (58.1)	36.4 (97.5)
Mean daily maximum °C (°F)	2.3 (36.1)	4.9 (40.8)	9.6 (49.3)	15.8 (60.4)	19.5 (67.1)	23.7 (74.7)	24.8 (76.6)	24.5 (76.1)	19.8 (67.6)	13.4 (56.1)	7.3 (45.1)	3.0 (37.4)	14.1 (57.3)
Daily mean °C (°F)	−0.2 (31.6)	1.3 (34.3)	5.7 (42.3)	10.6 (51.1)	15.0 (59.0)	18.6 (65.5)	20.3 (68.5)	20.0 (68.0)	15.2 (59.4)	10.1 (50.2)	4.7 (40.5)	0.7 (33.3)	10.2 (50.3)
Mean daily minimum °C (°F)	−2.6 (27.3)	−2.1 (28.2)	1.4 (34.5)	5.4 (41.7)	9.5 (49.1)	13.4 (56.1)	14.4 (57.9)	14.3 (57.7)	10.7 (51.3)	6.3 (43.3)	2.2 (36.0)	−1.6 (29.1)	5.9 (42.7)
Record low °C (°F)	−25.4 (−13.7)	−19.8 (−3.6)	−19.3 (−2.7)	−4.3 (24.3)	−1.3 (29.7)	2.2 (36.0)	6.6 (43.9)	6.2 (43.2)	1.0 (33.8)	−5.6 (21.9)	−12.5 (9.5)	−20.0 (−4.0)	−25.4 (−13.7)
Average precipitation mm (inches)	66.2 (2.61)	54.2 (2.13)	96.6 (3.80)	61.6 (2.43)	113.0 (4.45)	124.9 (4.92)	126.0 (4.96)	119.4 (4.70)	94.8 (3.73)	71.2 (2.80)	66.9 (2.63)	69.9 (2.75)	1,064.7 (41.91)
Average precipitation days (≥ 1.0 mm)	11.1	9.9	12.4	9	12.1	13.2	13	10.9	10.6	9.9	9.9	12	134
Source: NOAA, DWD

Climate data for Kremsmünster, Oberösterreich (1961-1990)
Month	Jan	Feb	Mar	Apr	May	Jun	Jul	Aug	Sep	Oct	Nov	Dec	Year
Mean daily maximum °C (°F)	1.5 (34.7)	3.4 (38.1)	8.5 (47.3)	13.1 (55.6)	18.8 (65.8)	21.4 (70.5)	23.5 (74.3)	23.4 (74.1)	18.8 (65.8)	12.9 (55.2)	6.0 (42.8)	2.7 (36.9)	12.8 (55.1)
Daily mean °C (°F)	−1.9 (28.6)	0.1 (32.2)	4.0 (39.2)	8.7 (47.7)	13.2 (55.8)	16.4 (61.5)	18.2 (64.8)	17.7 (63.9)	14.6 (58.3)	9.3 (48.7)	3.5 (38.3)	−0.4 (31.3)	8.6 (47.5)
Mean daily minimum °C (°F)	−3.4 (25.9)	−2.4 (27.7)	1.0 (33.8)	4.3 (39.7)	9.1 (48.4)	12.0 (53.6)	13.9 (57.0)	13.8 (56.8)	10.5 (50.9)	5.9 (42.6)	1.1 (34.0)	−2.0 (28.4)	5.3 (41.6)
Average precipitation mm (inches)	61.0 (2.40)	57.0 (2.24)	64.0 (2.52)	76.0 (2.99)	96.0 (3.78)	114.0 (4.49)	126.0 (4.96)	105.0 (4.13)	77.0 (3.03)	58.0 (2.28)	68.0 (2.68)	65.0 (2.56)	967 (38.06)
Average precipitation days (≥ 1.0 mm)	11	11	11	11	12	14	13	12	9	8	11	12	135
Average afternoon relative humidity (%) (at 14:00)	80	74	64	58	57	59	57	59	65	72	79	81	67
Mean monthly sunshine hours	46.5	79.1	124	159	204.6	207	232.5	213.9	159	114.7	54	40.3	1,634.6
Mean daily sunshine hours	1.5	2.8	4	5.3	6.6	6.9	7.5	6.9	5.3	3.7	1.8	1.3	4.5
Source: Deutscher Wetterdienst

== Economy ==
Kremsmünster is also a place of modern technology with about 3,000 employees (62% of them in production), e.g. in

- Petroleum industry (headquarters of Rohöl-Aufsuchungs Aktiengesellschaft in Krift)
- Plastics industry (Greiner Holding AG, worldwide 7,000 employees)
- Packaging and glass industry (e.g. Gablonzer)
- Construction companies, Arts and crafts
- Summer tourism (20–25,000 nights).
