= Kremsmünster Abbey =

Benedictine monastery in Upper Austria

Coordinates: 48°03′18″N 14°07′50″E

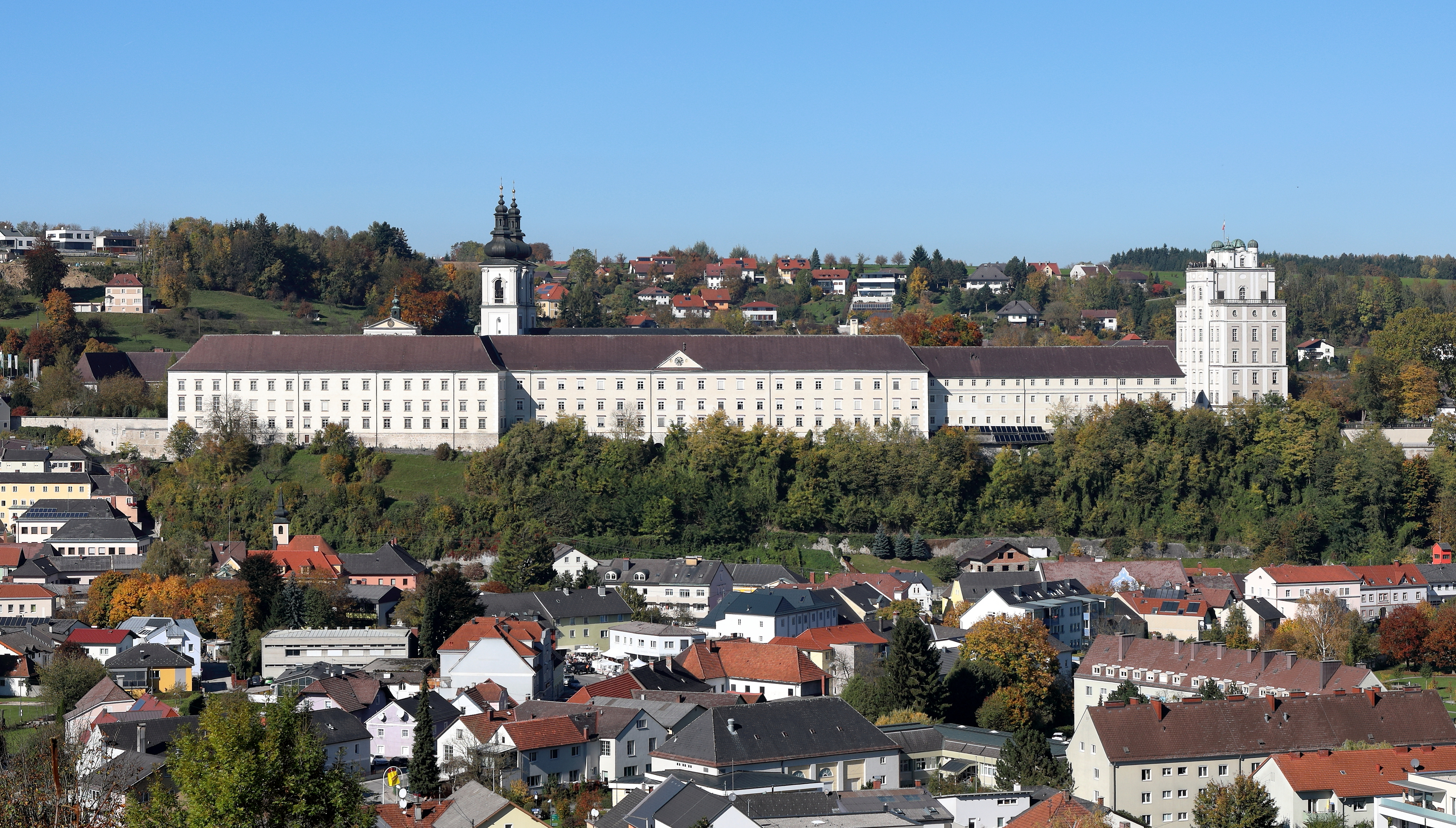
Kremsmünster Abbey

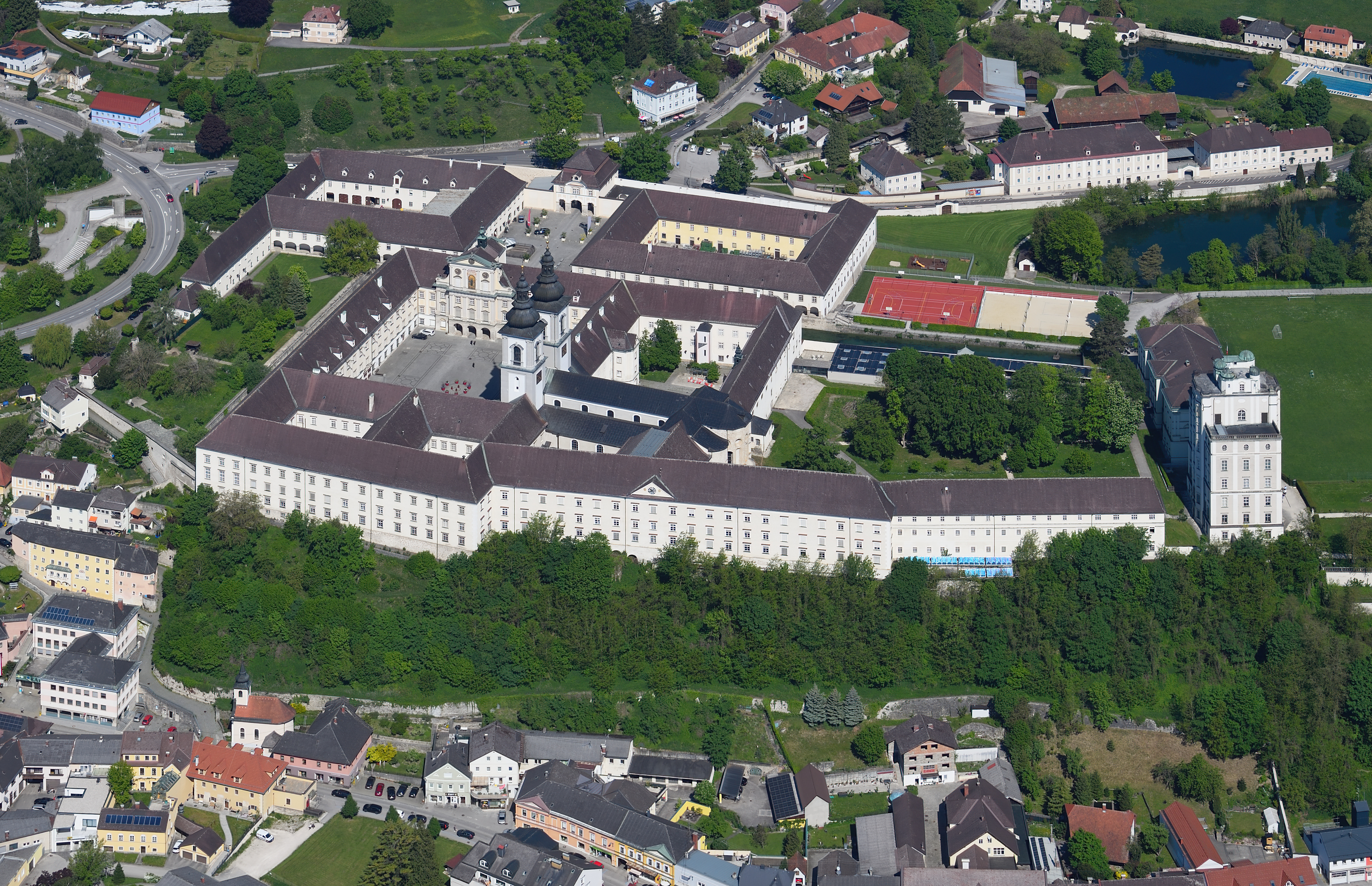
Aerial view

Kremsmünster Abbey (German: Stift Kremsmünster) is a Benedictine monastery located in Kremsmünster, Upper Austria.

== History ==
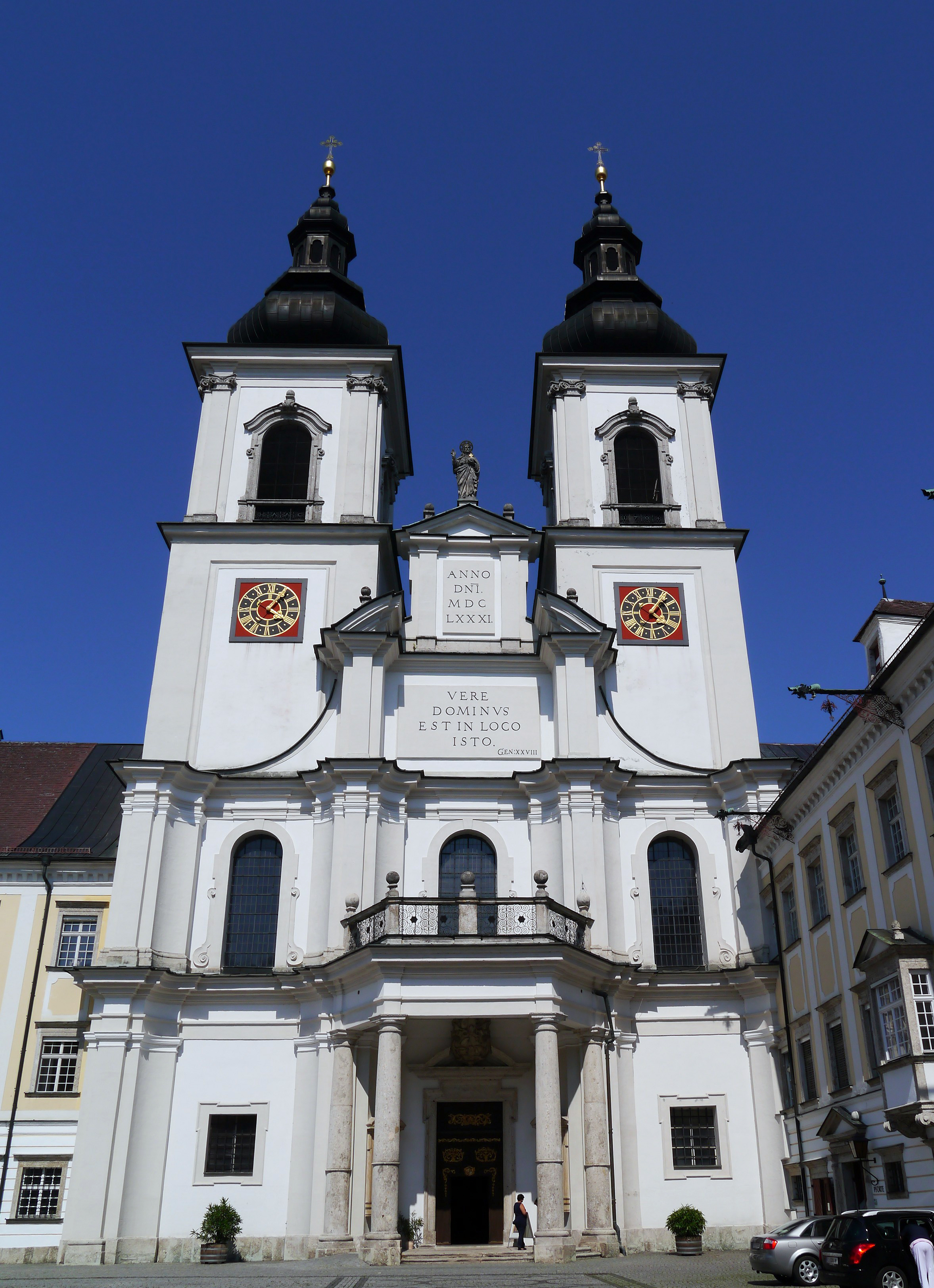
Kremsmünster Abbey Church

Founded in 777 AD by Tassilo III, Duke of Bavaria, Kremsmünster Abbey is steeped in legend. It is said that Tassilo established the abbey on the spot where his son, Gunther, was fatally wounded by a wild boar during a hunt.

The first colony of monks came from Lower Bavaria, under Fateric, the first abbot. The new foundation received generous endowments from the founder as well as from Charlemagne and his successors.

The abbey soon gained enough position and reputation that its abbots exercised episcopal jurisdiction.

In the 10th century, the abbey was destroyed. It was later restored and recovered its property under the emperor Henry II, when Saint Gotthard became abbot.

Kremsmünster, in common with other religious houses, then fell into a decline, which was halted by the action of bishop Altmann of Passau, who brought a community from Gottesau and introduced the reformed observance of Cluny into the abbey. After this, it became known as one of the most flourishing houses in Germany, "excelling all other abbeys" stated an anonymous chronicler, "in observance and piety, also in respect to its lands, buildings, books, paintings, and other possessions, and in the number of its members prominent in learning and in art".

The monastic library was famous, and drew eminent scholars to Kremsmünster, where several important historical works were written, including histories of the bishops of Passau and of the dukes of Bavari and the chronicles of the abbey itself. Schrodl gives a list of writers connected with Kremsmünster from the eleventh to the 16th century and of their literary labours. One of the most distinguished abbots was Ulrich Schoppenzaun (1454–1484), to whom, and to his disciple and successor Johann Schreiner (1505–1524), credit is due for Kremsmünster's surviving the Reformation.

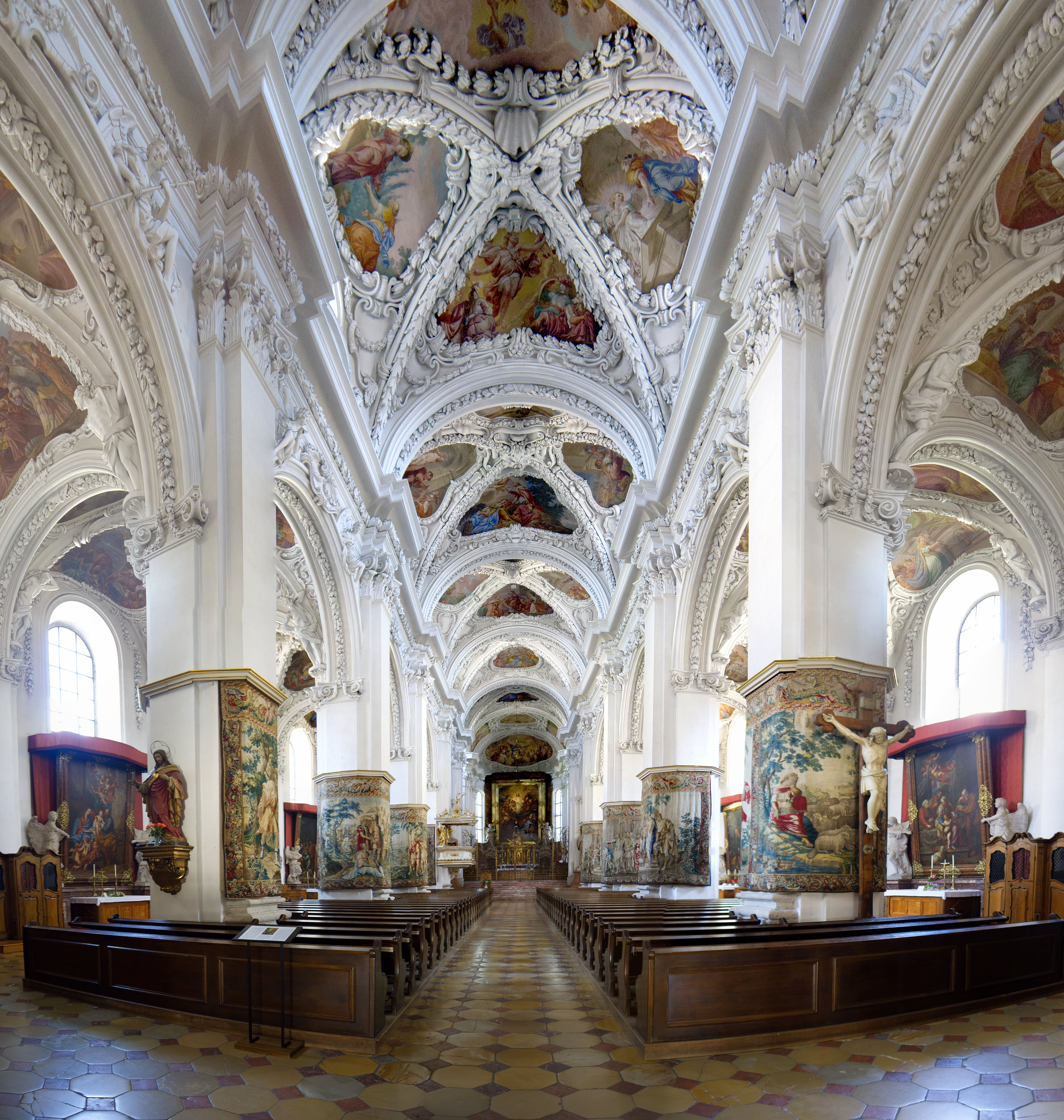
Abbey Church interior

From the Reformation period onward, a succession of abbots kept the abbey on track. Abbot Gregor Lechner (1543–1558), towards the middle of the 16th century, made the monastic school, previously private, into a public school and did much to preserve Catholicism in the district, where the Protestant doctrines had become widely prevalent—to the extent that his successor, Abbot Weiner (1558–1565), favoured them and thus introduced dissension into the abbey that risked developing into serious disruption. This was prevented by succeeding abbots; Abbot Wolfradt especially (1613–1639) brought the monastery into so highly flourishing a condition that he was known as its third founder. Its reputation as a house of studies and learning was increased still further under his successor, Placid Buchauer (1644–1669).

Among the abbots of the 18th century, the most prominent and distinguished was Alexander Fixlmillner (1731–1759), who built the great observatory, constructed many roads on the monastic estate, and was a man of edifying life and great charity to the poor. His nephew Placidus Fixlmillner, the first astronomer to compute the orbit of Uranus, was later appointed the director of the observatory.

Towards the end of the 18th century, the policy of Emperor Joseph II with regard to the religious houses of his empire threatened to close Kremsmünster, like many others, but it was fortunate enough to escape.

The abbey suffered a great deal during the Napoleonic Wars, and was slow in recovering its position. It was not until the abbacy of Thomas Mitterndorfer (1840–1860) that, having recovered its material security and re-established learning and discipline, Kremsmünster regained its former prestige. 19th-century abbot Cölestin Ganglbauer (died 1889), who celebrated in 1877 the 1100th anniversary of the foundation, became Archbishop of Vienna in 1881 and was raised to the cardinalate in 1884. In the 20th century, Leander Czerny, the entomologist, was abbot from 1905 to 1929.

Since 1625, Kremsmünster has been a member of the Austrian Congregation, now within the Benedictine Confederation.

During World War II, a letter written by Director Hans. Posse addressed to Reichsleiter Bormann, Martin, gave a report about a journey made to upper Austria and Vienna with a view of securing sufficient storage space for the temporary storage of art treasures confiscated from Abbeys in Austria which had been acquired by Hitler. It decides that Abbey Kremsmünster is excellently fitted for this purpose. It emphasizes that this Abbey has approximately 50 to 60 dry and spacious rooms apart from some other apartments suitable for the purpose, which implies and gives a lead to the enormity of the loot taken. It mentions that as this Abbey is situated in a far-off valley, the danger from the air can be ignored. The abbey also played a role in the end of World War II, as it was here that on May 8, 1945, the exiled Slovak government capitulated to General Walton Walker leading the XX Corps of the 3rd US Army.

== Buildings ==
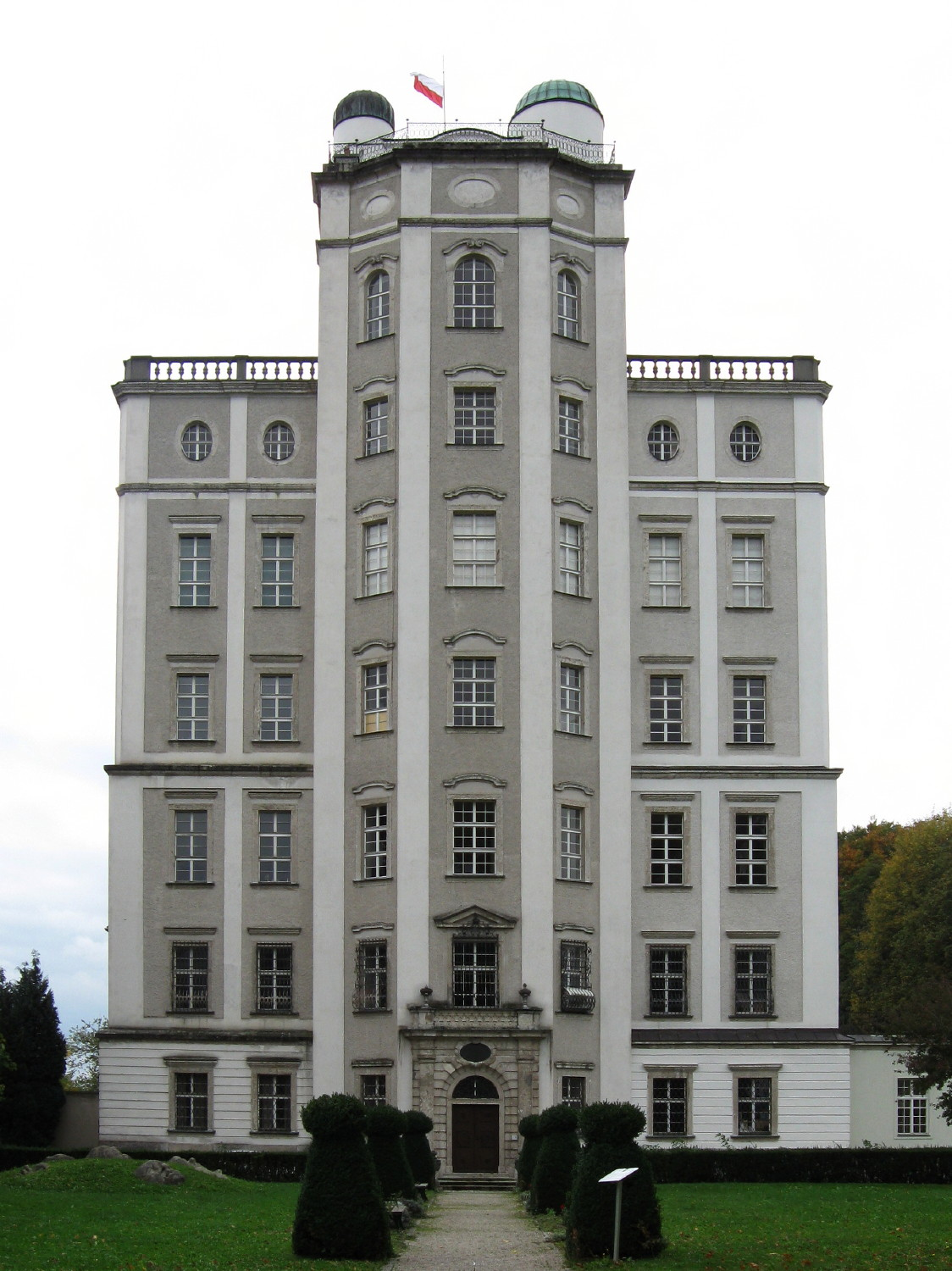
Mathematical Tower with astronomical observatories

From the middle of the 17th century, thanks to an extensive programme of construction largely reusing older building materials, the premises grew so large that in the whole of Austria they were second only to Melk. The architect and builder was Jakob Prandtauer, who was also responsible for the designs of Melk Abbey.

Kremsmünster reached its greatest extent in the south wing, which is about 290 meters long. The most important rooms were situated here: the refectory, the library and the Emperor's Hall. The wing terminates to the east in the Mathematical Tower, which is 51 meters high, where the observatory is located (the Kremsmünster Sternwarte). There is an interesting collection of objects of natural history in the lower part of the observatory, which is eight stories high; and features a series of fish-tanks decorated with statues and a colonnade.

== Abbey church ==
The main church is dedicated to "Christ the Saviour and St. Agapitus" (Zum Heiligen Erlöser und zum Heiligen Agapitos). Construction was completed in 1277, in the late Romanesque and early Gothic styles. After 1613 the church was remodelled in the Baroque style. Between 1680 and 1720, the interior of the church was redecorated with splendid Baroque ornamentation to designs by Carlo Antonio Carlone, Giovanni Battista Colomba and Giovanni Battista Barberini.

Of especial note is the Baroque high altar, created by Johann Andreas Wolf in 1712, after twelve years of design and preparation. The angels by Johann Michael Zürn the younger, who kneel and stand at the numerous side-altars, are also impressive examples of the Austrian Baroque.

The church also contains the celebrated Grave of Gunther, a cenotaph which originally had been placed in front of the high altar and in its current form dates from sometime prior to 1304.

== School ==
The monastery school has existed since at least 1549. The poet and writer Adalbert Stifter is an alumnus. The monks still work today in education and maintain a school, as well as in pastoral care.

=== Child abuse ===
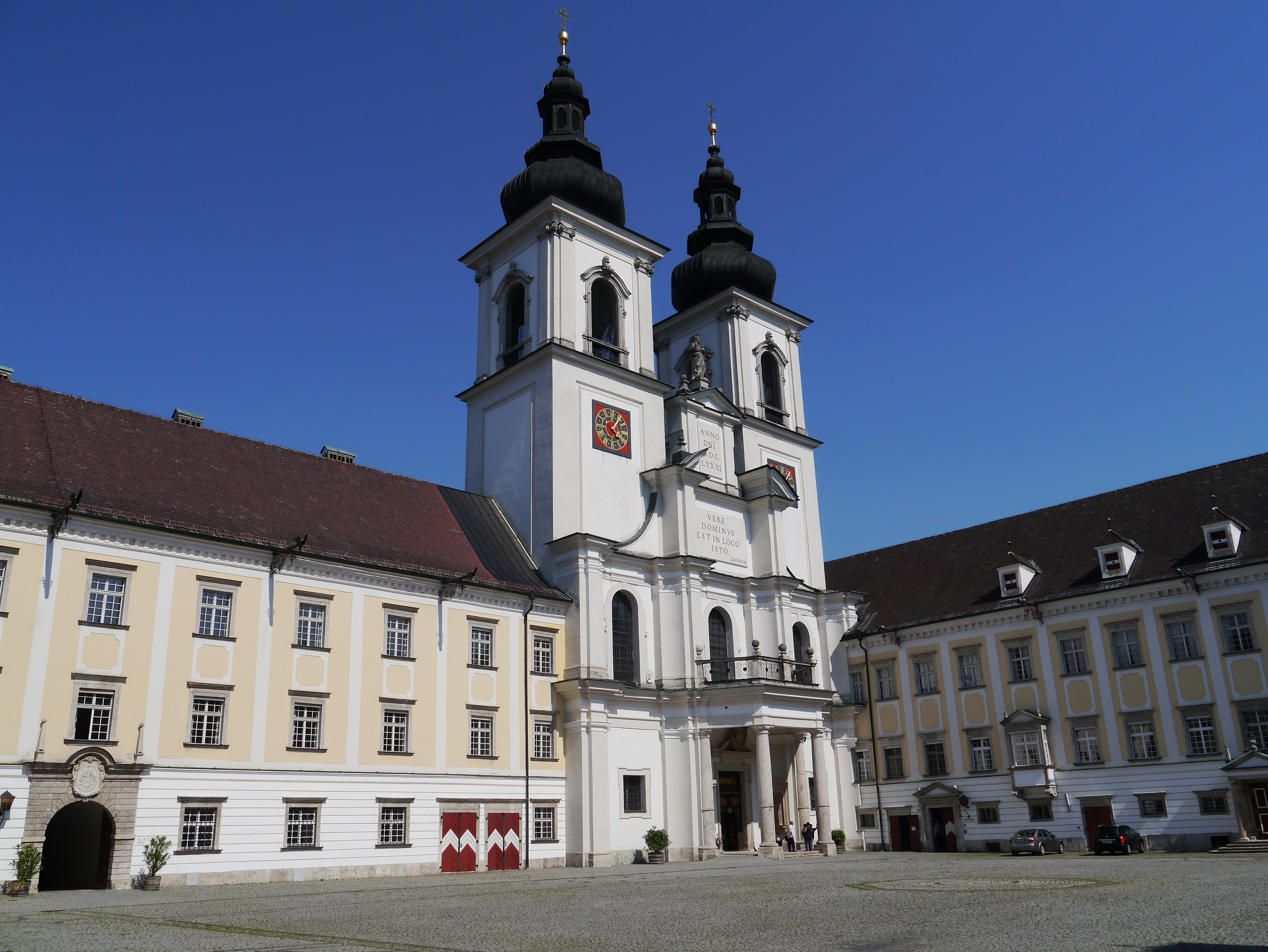
Kremsmünster Abbey inner courtyard

In March 2010 several monks were suspended for severe allegations of sexual abuse and physical violence. The reported incidents, that range over a period from the 1970s until the late 1990s have been subject to police investigation. While further charges against two of the three accused priests were dropped due to expiration of the statute of limitations, there followed three years of investigations in almost 30 cases against August Mandorfer (Father Alfons), the former director of the boarding school. SA search and seizure at the monastery in 2010 revealed that the accused teacher also owned a pump-action shotgun amongst other weapons. According to investigations by several victims, the Kremsmünster Abbey has a long criminal tradition of systematic child abuse. Decades before the currently reported cases around Father Alfons, and in addition to the already expired charges against Father Benedikt and Father Petrus, there exists strong evidence for severe previous instances of sexual abuse involving Father Georg in the 1960s and Father Altman Kellner before and during the 1950s. In July 2013, an Austrian court found Mandorfer guilty in 24 documented cases of child abuse and sexual violence, and sentenced the now defrocked priest to twelve years in prison. In March 2015, a research team led by the German sociologist Heiner Keupp presented the results of a scientific study on the topic Sexual abuse, psychological abuse, and physical violence at the Kremsmünster boarding school, which identified a total of 16 violent and 8 sexual abusers within a period from 1945 until 2000. In 2013, it was revealed that the school had paid approximately €700,000 in compensation since the scandal erupted.

== Library ==
The monastery library was built between 1680 and 1689, also by Carlo Antonio Carlone. It is one of the great libraries of Austria and contains about 160,000 volumes, besides 1,700 manuscripts and nearly 2,000 incunabula.

The most valuable book is the "Codex Millenarius", a Gospel Book written around 800 in Mondsee Abbey. Facsimiles of this codex may be found in the libraries of a number of universities throughout the world.

== Treasures ==
The most famous item of the treasury of the monastery is the Tassilo Chalice, donated to the monastery by its founder, Tassilo III. The copper and silver-gilt goblet (25.5 cm high, weighing 3 kg, and holding 1.75 litres) was created some time between 768/769 and 788, possibly in Mondsee or Salzburg.

The two Tassilo Candlesticks were originally thought to have been worked from the sceptre of Tassilo, but today they are recognized as works of the mid-10th century.

The Tassilo Chalice, the candlesticks and the Codex Millenarius are still used in religious services to this day, though only on special occasions.

== Gallery ==
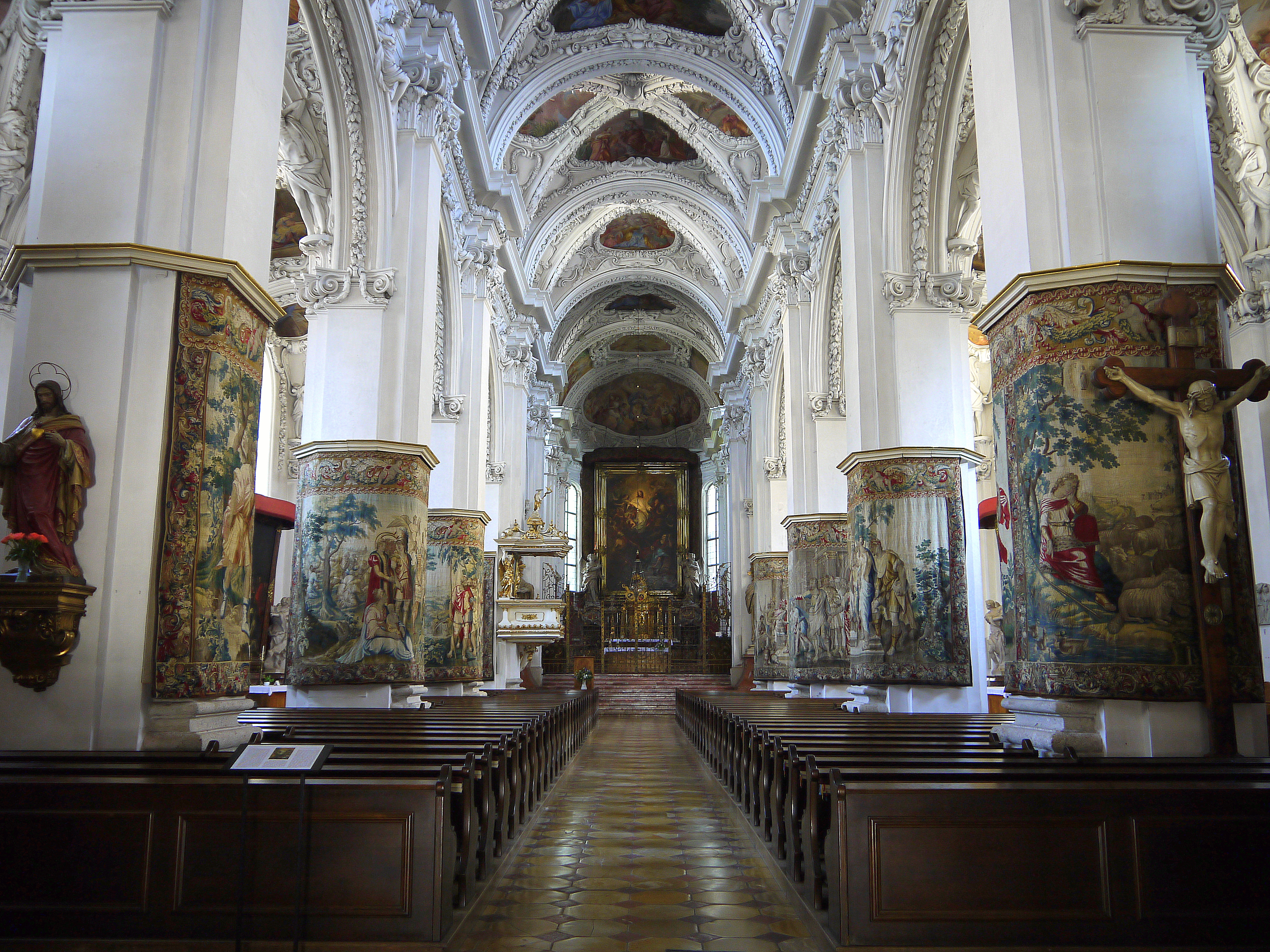
Abbey Church interior

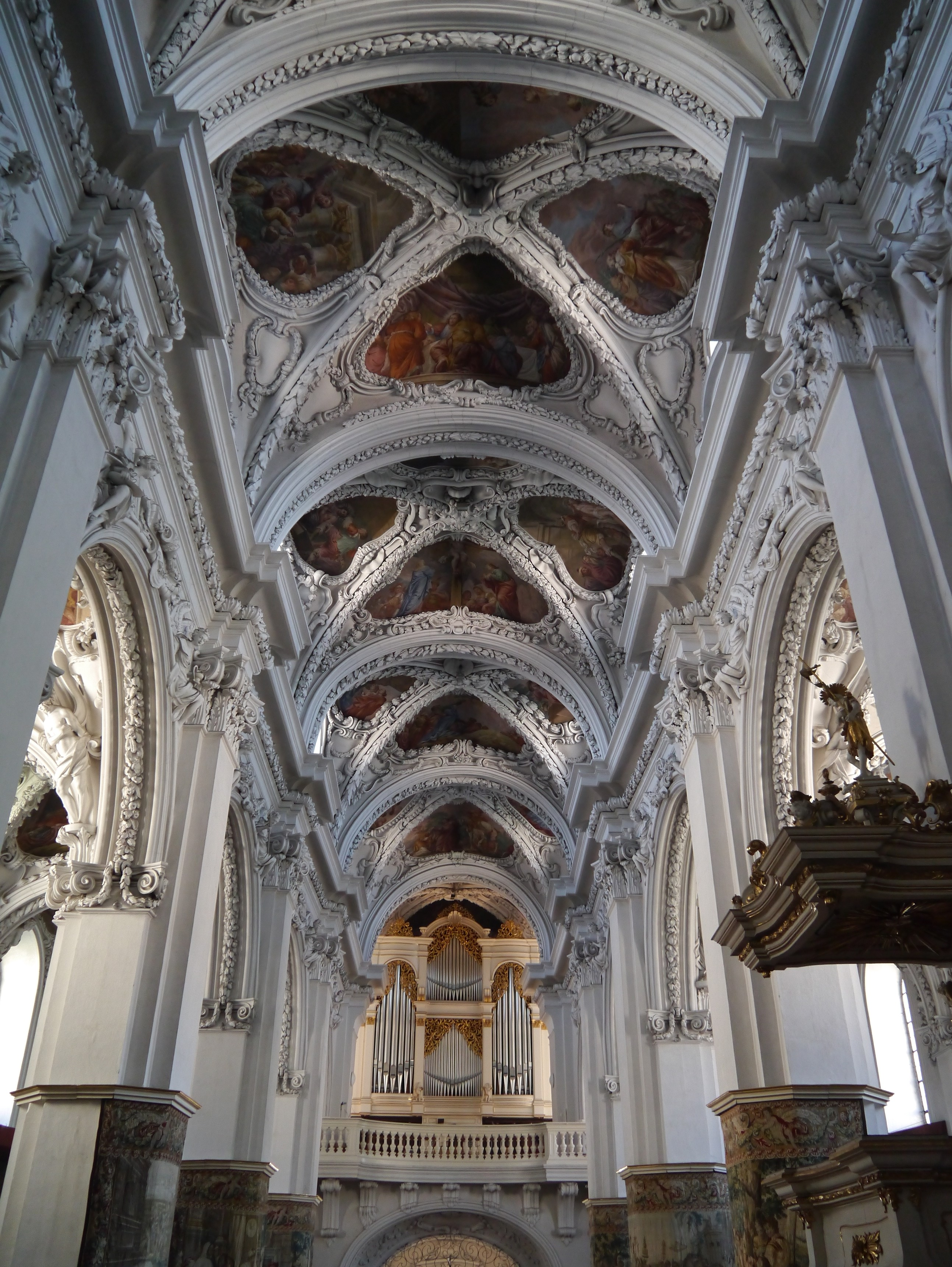
Choir loft and ceiling

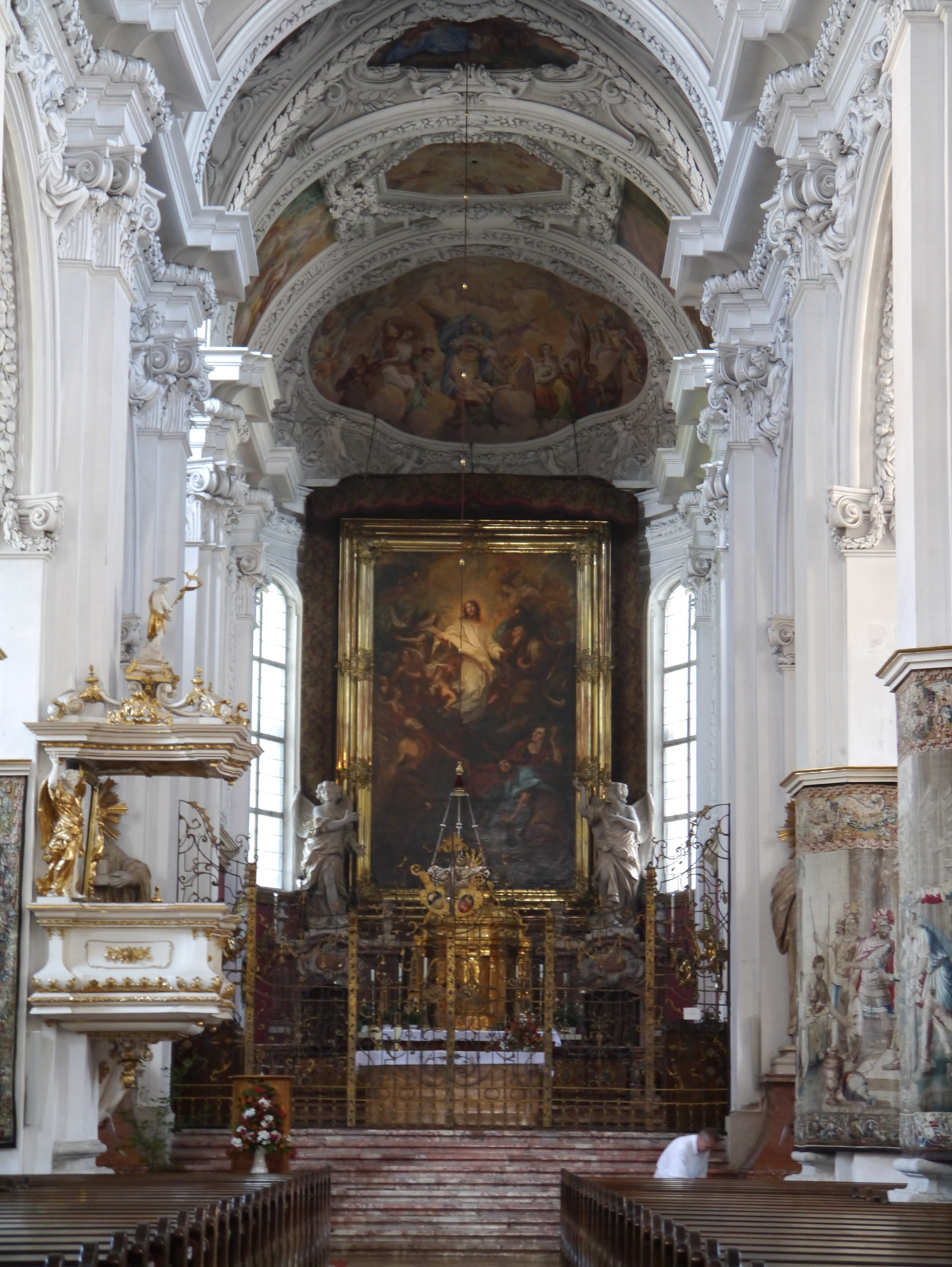
High Altar and pulpit

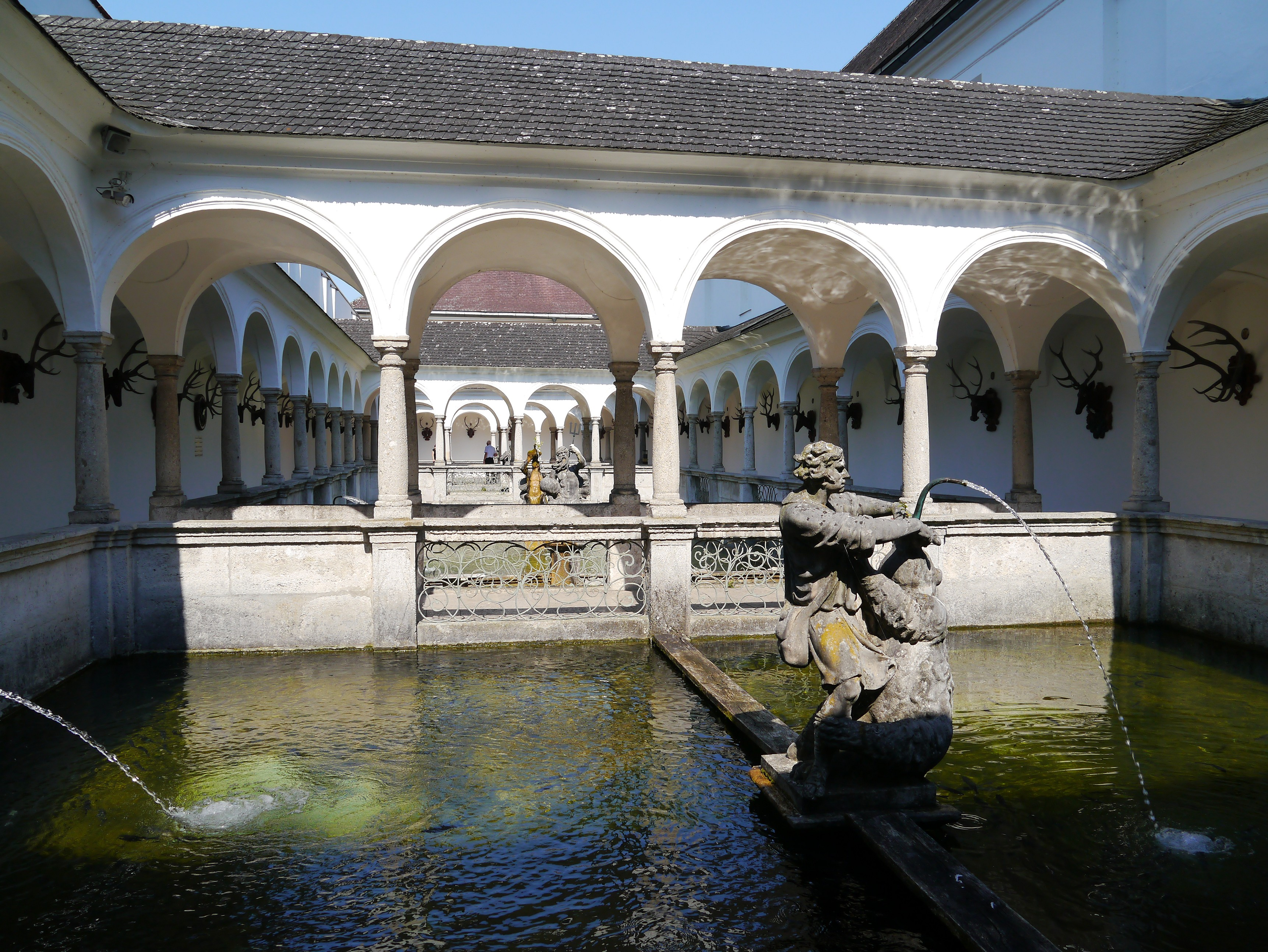
Fish hatchery

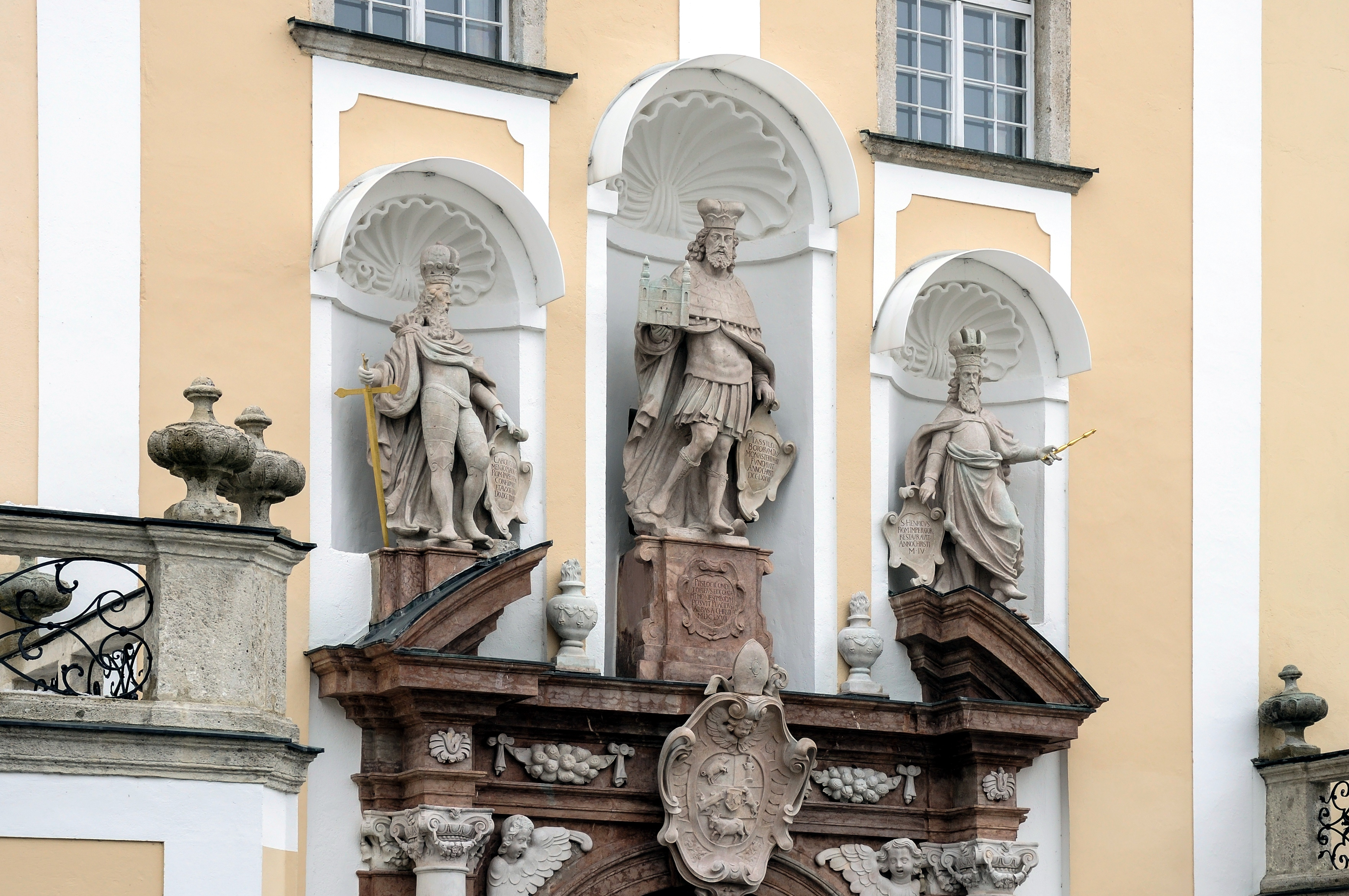
Inner court portal

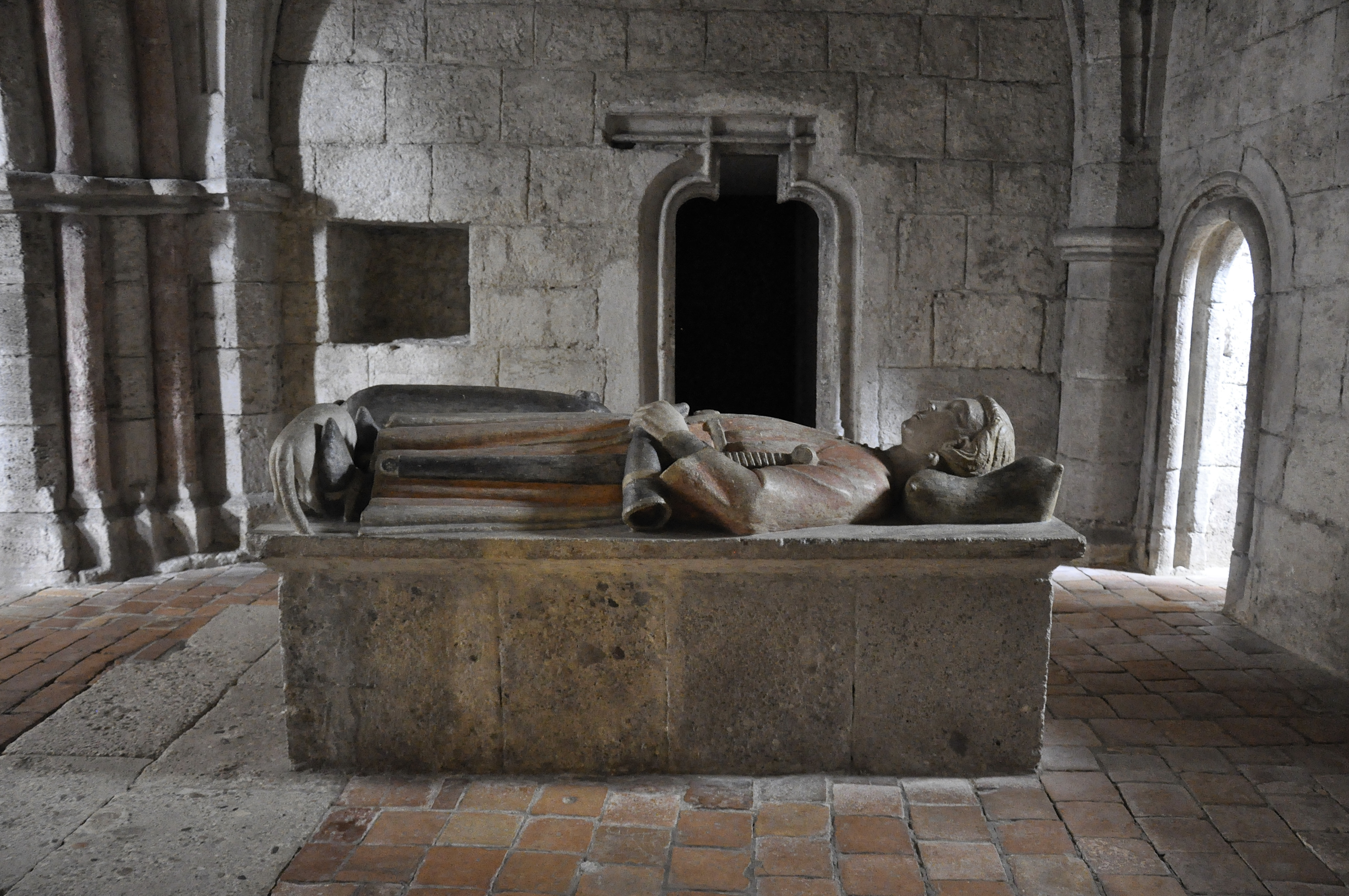
Tomb of Gunther, the son of Duke Tassilo

== Notes ==
Schrodl, Kirchenlex., VII, 1053

== See also ==
- Marian Wolfgang Koller, professorship of natural history, later director of the astronomical observatory
- Wisinto of Kremsmünster
