= Marian Wolfgang Koller =

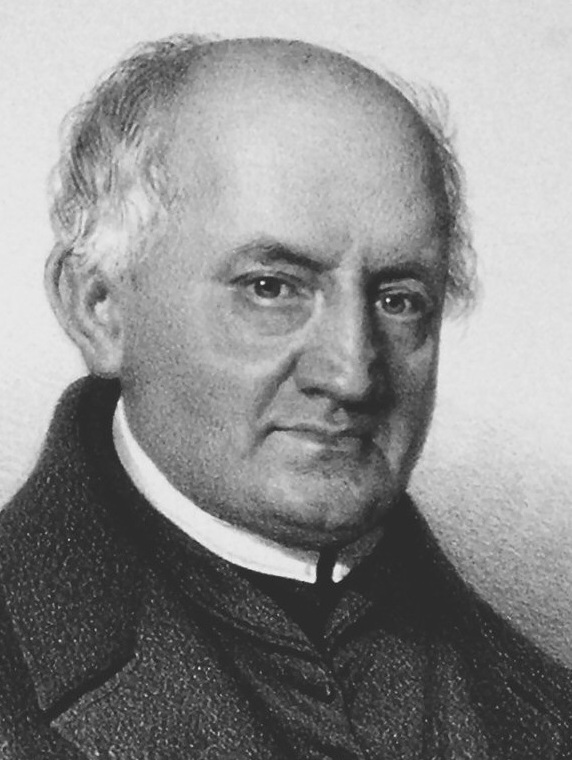
Marian Wolfgang Koller 1850

Marian Wolfgang Koller (31 October 1792 in Feistritz in Carniola, Austria – 19 September 1866 in Vienna) was a scientist and educator.

After studying at Feistritz, he went to Laibach (Ljubljana), where he spent nine years (1802–11) in classical, philosophical, and scientific studies, and completed his school life by a course in higher mathematics at Vienna. From 1814 to 1816 he acted as private tutor in a family in Steinbach, and whilst here he was so attracted by the life and work of the Benedictines of Kremsmunster that he finally entered their novitiate on 5 October 1816, taking the name Marian in place of his baptismal name of Wolfgang. He was ordained priest on 18 August 1821, and after three years of work in the parish of Sippachzell he was recalled to Kremsmunster to teach natural history and physics.

In 1830, he was relieved of the professorship of natural history and appointed director of the astronomical observatory, a position he retained for the next seventeen years. He continued also to teach physics until 1839, when he was given general charge of the student body. His administrative abilities attracted the attention of the authorities at Vienna whither he was called in 1847. From this time on he was employed in high offices either in the University of Vienna or in the Department of Education, which was at that time undergoing a process of reconstruction. All matters pertaining to the Realschulen, and to the polytechnic, nautical, and astronomical institutions, were placed under his immediate care, and, as a mark of appreciation for his share in the reorganization of the Realschulen, the emperor bestowed on him the Cross of the Order of Leopold on 27 May 1859. In 1848 he was elected member of the Imperial Academy of Sciences, and took an active part in its proceedings. He was also an active writer, and contributed to various scientific periodicals many articles on astronomy, physics and meteorology. His principal work is the Berechnung der periodischen Naturerscheinungen, published in the "Wiener Denkschrift" (1850). Koller died from Cholera.

== See also ==
- List of Roman Catholic scientist-clerics
