= Wisinto of Kremsmünster =

Wisinto of Kremsmünster (died c. 1250) was an Austrian Benedictine priest, monk, and holy figure. Little is known of his life other than the fact that he served at Kremsmünster Abbey. Austrian Benedictines refer to him as Saint Wisinto; elsewhere, however, he is known as Blessed. His feast day is 31 December.
