= Mondsee Gospel of Matthew =

9th-century Bible manuscript in Old High German

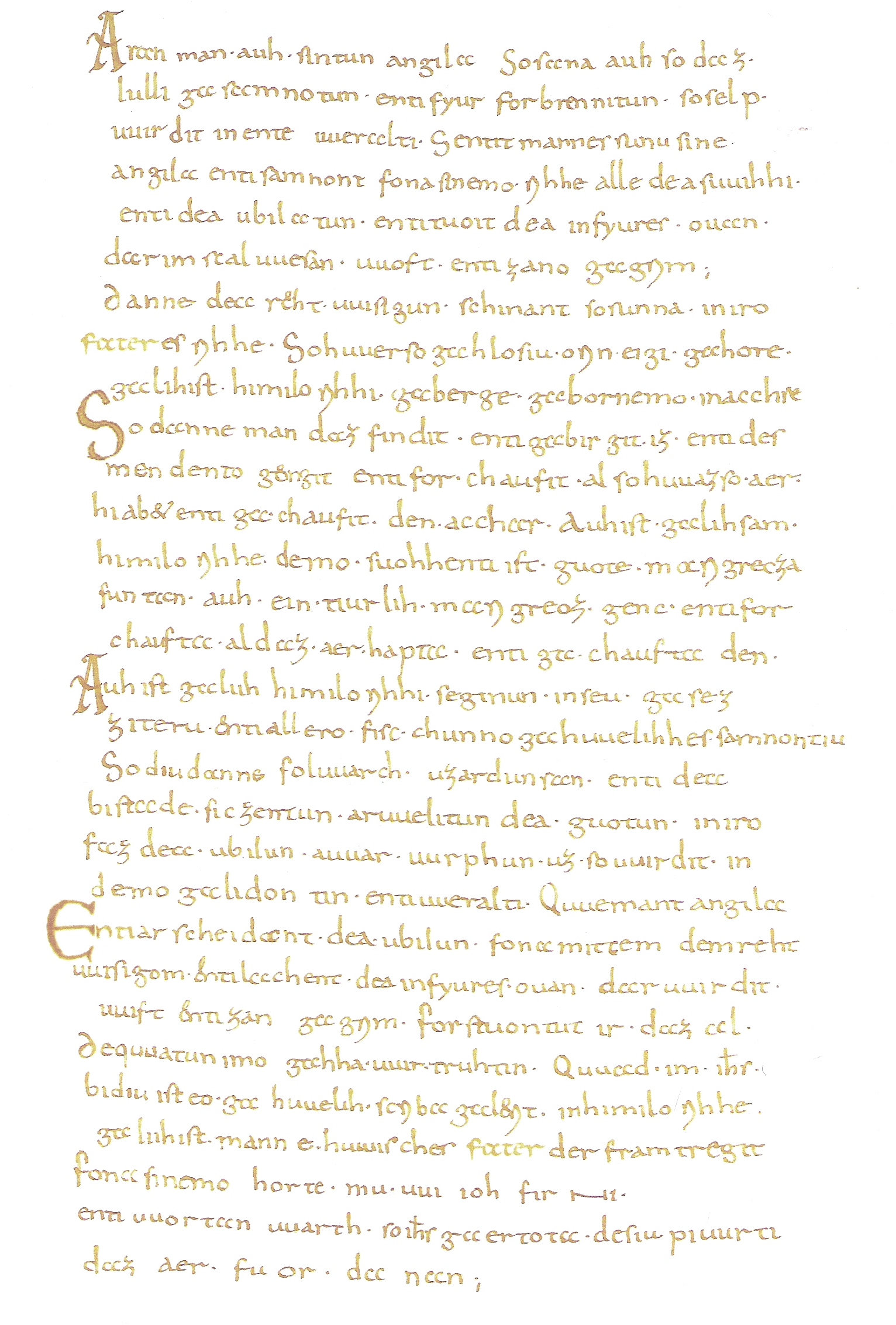
Reconstruction of Fragment NB12799B (Matthew 13:39–53) in Old High German

The Mondsee Gospel of Matthew (German: Mondseer Matthäusevangelium) part of the Mondseer Fragments, is an essential early medieval manuscript fragment and one of the earliest recorded translations of a biblical portion into Old High German, specifically rendered in an Old Bavarian dialect. These texts, translated at the Benedictine Abbey of Mondsee, offer significant insights into the linguistic, theological, and translational developments of early medieval Europe.

== History and Provenance ==
The origins of the Mondsee Fragments lie in the western regions of the Frankish Empire, with dates placing them in the early 9th century. These manuscripts were produced at the Benedictine Abbey of Mondsee, established under Duke Odilo of Bavaria. It is believed that the monks who scribed these texts came either from Monte Cassino or the Salzburg monastery.

The name "Mondsee" has evolved over time—from "Maninseo" and "Lunaelacus" to variants such as "Moensee"—and was reintroduced into German studies by Jacob and Wilhelm Grimm in 1854.

== Text and Structure ==
The parchment manuscript of the Mondsee Gospel of Matthew consists of fragmentary leaves. The recto of each leaf features the Old High German (or Old Bavarian) translation of the corresponding Latin text from the Vulgate, while the verso displays the original Latin text. This bilingual arrangement is typical for the Mondsee Fragments. Besides the Gospel of Matthew, the collection includes

- A translation of Prosper Tiro's sermon De vocatione omnium gentium.
- An unknown sermon fragment.
- Sermon 76 (Sermo LXXVI) by Augustine of Hippo, presented in both Latin and Old High German.
- An Old High German translation of Isidore of Seville's De fide catholica contra Iudaeos.

The Mondsee Gospel of Matthew maintains a close correspondence to the Latin original, refraining from the freer stylistic modifications found in other vernacular texts (such as those in Otfrid's works or the Heliand). This fidelity to the source text enhances its importance for studies on early German biblical translations and text transmission.

== Linguistic and Cultural Significance ==
As the earliest extant translation of any biblical text into Old High German, the Mondsee Gospel of Matthew represents a crucial milestone in the transmission of scripture. It documents early endeavors to make Latin liturgical texts accessible to communities not fully versed in Latin, thereby supporting teaching and religious instruction. The manuscript also reflects the interplay between Latin and emerging Germanic linguistic expressions during the Carolingian Renaissance, evident in its occasional innovative lexical choices and adaptations tailored for a monastic audience.

Moreover, the bilingual nature—with the Latin text on the verso—provides modern scholars an invaluable resource for comparing translation methodologies and understanding how religious texts were adapted to regional linguistic norms within the Frankish empire.

== Modern Scholarship and Editions ==
The text of the Gospel of Matthew in the Mondsee Fragments has attracted specialized scholarly attention, particularly regarding early German Bible translations and the history of manuscript traditions. Scholars have noted the unique linguistic features of the Old High German translation, which reflect a blend of Frankish and Bavarian dialects. This blend provides valuable insights into the linguistic landscape of early medieval Germany. Additionally, the Mondsee Fragments are significant for their textual relationship with other early medieval manuscripts, such as the Codex Junius and the Isidore Group, offering a deeper understanding of textual transmission and variation during the period. Notable researchers include Klaus Matzel, who analyzed the Latin component and the bilingual nature of the text, and Elke Krotz, who has recently reevaluated the linguistic and cultural contexts of the Mondsee Fragments.

== Important editions and studies include ==
- Matzel, Klaus (1965). "Der lateinische Text des Matthäus-Evangeliums der Monseer Fragmente". Beiträge zur Geschichte der deutschen Sprache und Literatur. 87: 289–363. doi:10.1515/bgsl.1965.1965.87.289. reprinted 1990
- Krotz, Elke (2002). Auf den Spuren des althochdeutschen Isidor. Universitätsverlag Winter. ISBN 978-3825313630. which provides an in-depth analysis of the Mondsee Fragments, including the Gospel of Matthew.
