= Codex Millenarius =

Latin biblical manuscript (c. 800)

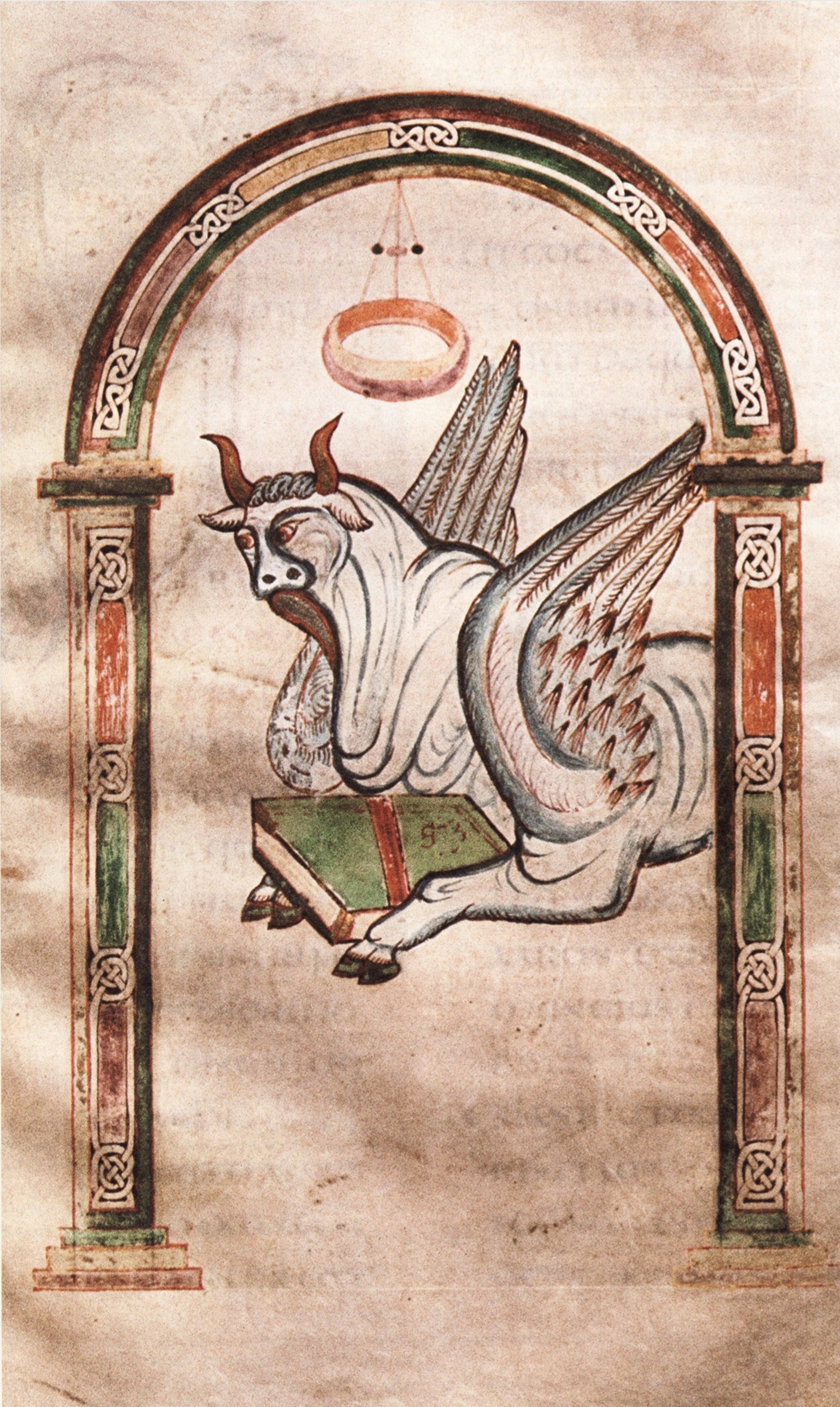

The Codex Millenarius is an ancient book, containing all four Gospels in Latin. Believed to have been written around 800 at Mondsee Abbey, it is housed in the great library of Kremsmünster Abbey in Austria, which contains other items of paramount religious and cultural value, such as the Tassilo Chalice.

The decoration of the book from the Carolingian period consists of eight frames with the representation of the four evangelists and their symbols, making the sacred text a unique work of art.
