= Suben Abbey =

Prison in Austria

Coordinates: 48°24′45″N 13°25′47″E

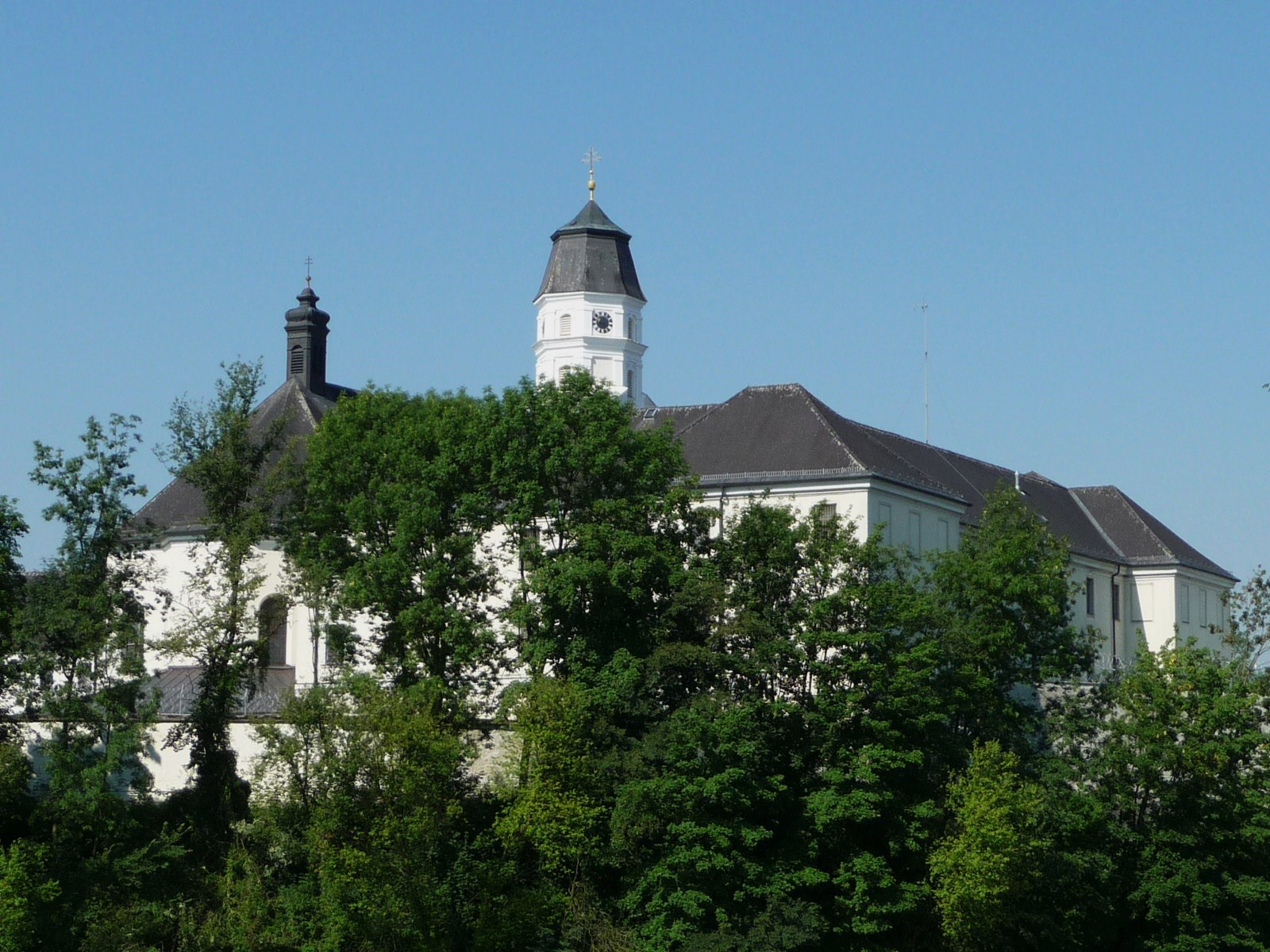

Suben Abbey (Stift Suben) was a monastery of the Augustinian Canons in Suben in Austria.

In around 1050 the fortress that stood on the site, the property of the Counts of Formbach, was turned into a collegiate foundation by Tuta, daughter of Heinrich of Formbach, and wife of King Bela I of Hungary; it was established as a monastery in 1126. It had possessions in the Inn region, in Carinthia, Styria and the Wachau. In 1787 it was dissolved by Emperor Joseph II. The premises later passed into the possession of the Bavarian Field Marshal Prince Karl Philipp von Wrede. Since 1865 they have been used as a prison.
