= Mondsee Abbey =

Monastery in Upper Austria, Austria

Coordinates: 47°51′26″N 13°21′00″E

- Aerial view of Mondsee Abbey
- Interactive map of Mondsee Abbey

Monastery information
- Order: Benedictine
- Established: 748

Architecture
- Country: Austria

Mondsee Abbey (German: Kloster Mondsee) was a Benedictine monastery in Mondsee in Upper Austria.

== History ==
The region of the Mondseeland, in which Mondsee is located, was formerly part of Bavaria. Mondsee Abbey was founded in 748 by Odilo, Duke of Bavaria on the ruins of a Roman settlement.

According to legend, Duke Odilo was in the area with his wife and large entourage, got lost and was surprised by the night. He was at risk of falling high on a rock. But when the moon came out between the clouds, it made the water surface of the lake shine deep, which made the Duke aware of the danger. In gratitude for his salvation, Duke Odilo vowed to have a monastery built on the shores of the lake and gave the lake the name "Mondsee".

The abbey tradition was that the first monks came from the St Peter's abbey of Salzburg and others also from Monte Cassino in Italy.

In 788, after the fall of Duke Tassilo III, Mondsee became an Imperial abbey and over the centuries acquired extensive property. Mondsee had a very active scriptorium and became an important centre for book production in Upper Austria. Around 800 the Codex Millenarius, an illustrated Latin book of the Gospels was written at the abbey. Around the year 810, monks at Mondsee Abbey translated the Gospel of Matthew from Latin into Old High German. The surviving fragments represent the oldest known translation of any part of the Bible into Old High German. In 831 King Louis the Pious gave the monastery to Regensburg Cathedral. Wolfgang of Regensburg, Bishop of Ratisbon, spent a year at Mondsee in 976.

It was not until 1142 that it regained its independence, under Abbot Conrad II, otherwise Conrad of Mondsee. Conrad, formerly a monk of Siegburg Abbey, had been abbot of Mondsee since 1127, and was extremely successful in defending and regaining the rights and possessions of the monastery, to the extent that in 1145 he was murdered by a group of nobles at Oberwang nearby. He was venerated as a martyr and declared Blessed.

Conrad was succeeded as abbot by Walter of Mondsee (died 17 May 1158), long remembered as a model by the community for his exemplary striving after virtue. He was buried in St. Peter's chapel in the abbey church.

In 1506 possession of the Mondseeland passed from Bavaria to Austria. In 1514 Abbot Wolfgang Haberl established the abbey grammar school. After a period of decline during the Reformation and the consequent disturbances, the abbey entered a new period of prosperity. Under Abbot Bernhard Lidl (1727–73) and especially in connection with the celebration of the thousandth anniversary of the foundation, there was extensive re-building of the church and the monastic premises. From 1773 the abbot was Opportunus II Dunkl, who was the last abbot of Mondsee: in 1791 the abbey was dissolved by Emperor Leopold II. Many of its manuscripts were transferred to what are today the Austrian National Library, the State Library of Upper Austria and the State Archive of Upper Austria.

From 1625 until its dissolution the abbey was a member of the Benedictine Austrian Congregation.

During the Napoleonic period the Mondseeland reverted to Bavaria for a few years. During that time, in 1810, the Bavarian Field Marshal Prince Karl Philipp von Wrede acquired the abandoned monastery (along with the nearby abbeys of Suben and Gleink), and used it as a castle. Wrede remained the owner even after the return of the territory to Austria and significantly developed the locality, for example by the construction of roads and the establishment of local cheese production. In 1905, on the death of Princess Ignazia von Wrede, Mondsee passed to the Counts Almeida, whose descendants sold it in 1985.

== Basilica of St. Michael ==
The abbey church of St. Michael became the parish church. The altarpiece is designed as a giant reliquary, containing, among others, the jeweled skeleton of Abbot Konrad II. Pope John Paul II upgraded the church to a basilica in 2005.

== Filmography ==
The wedding scene from The Sound of Music was filmed in the location.

== Gallery ==
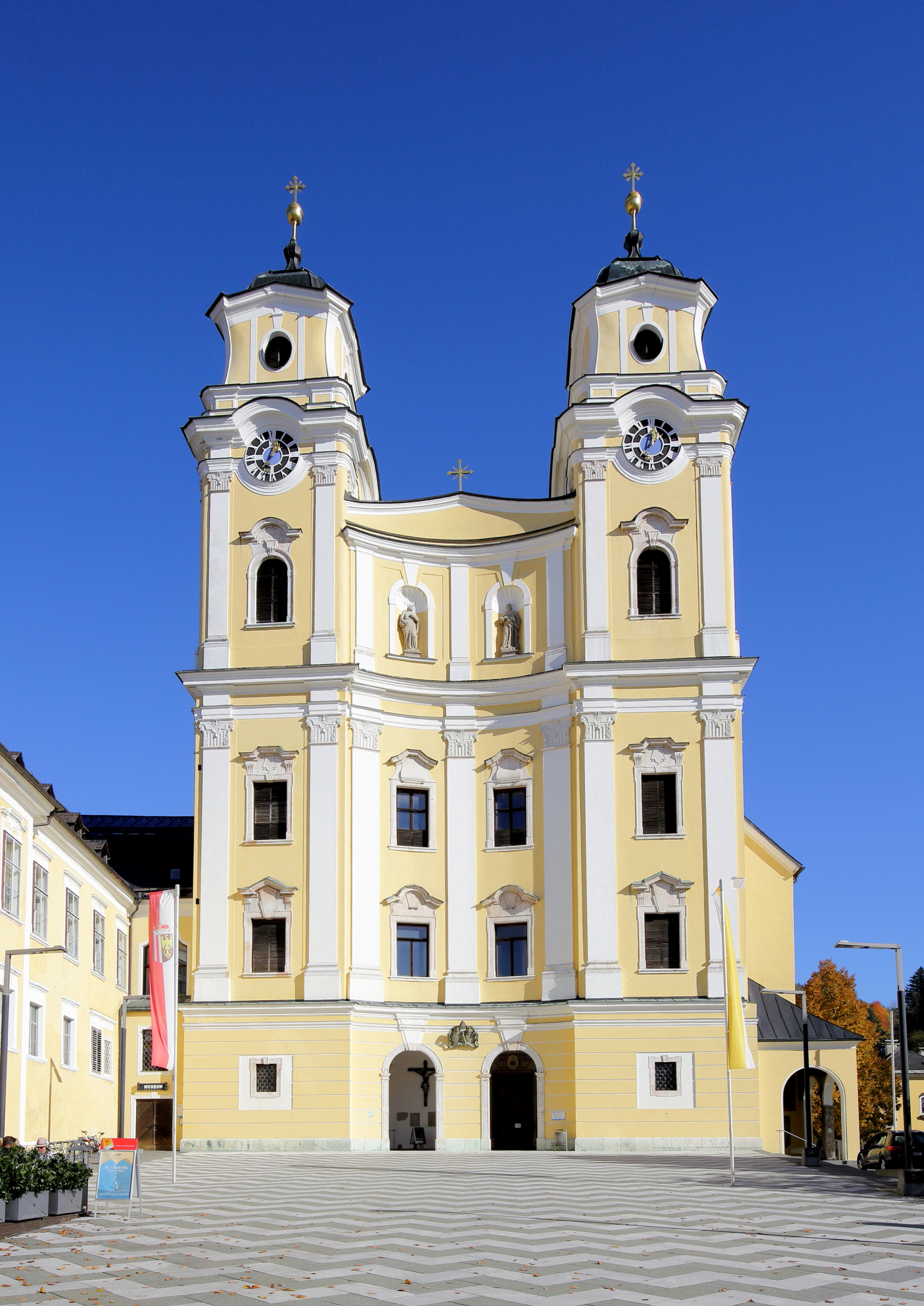
The Collegiate Church of St Michael, Mondsee — formerly the monastery church

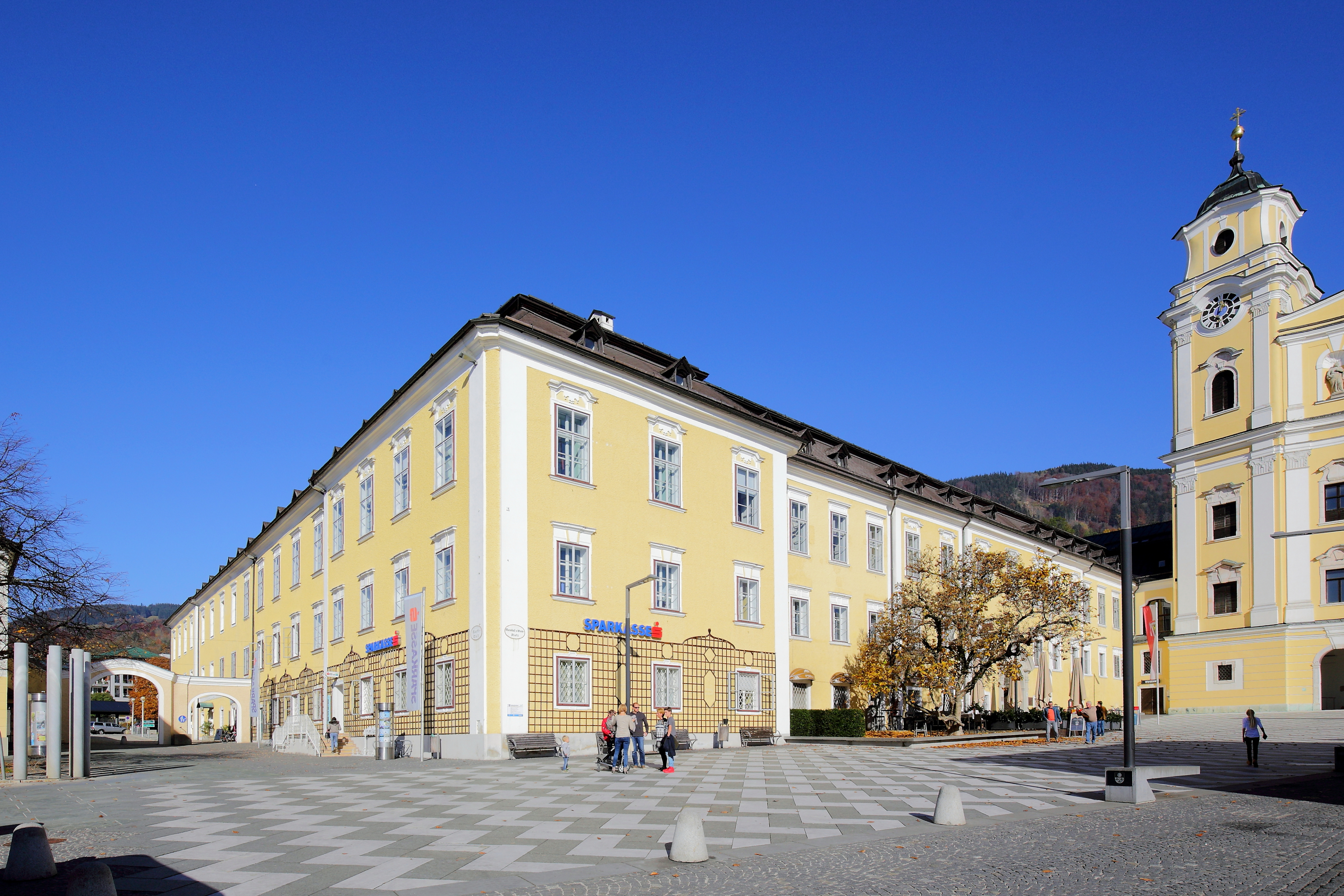
Mondsee Abbey

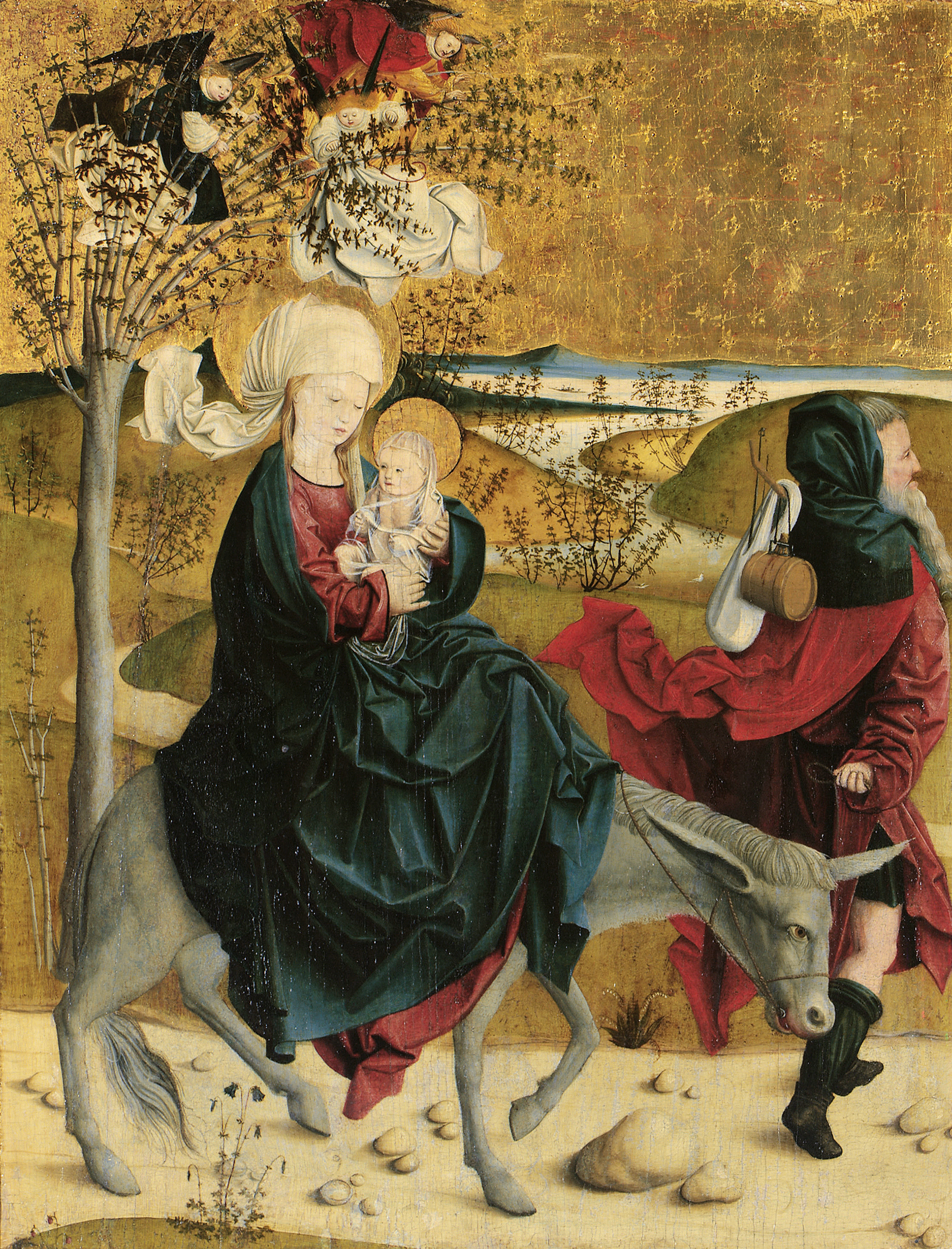
Flight into Egypt, high altar, Mondsee Abbey church

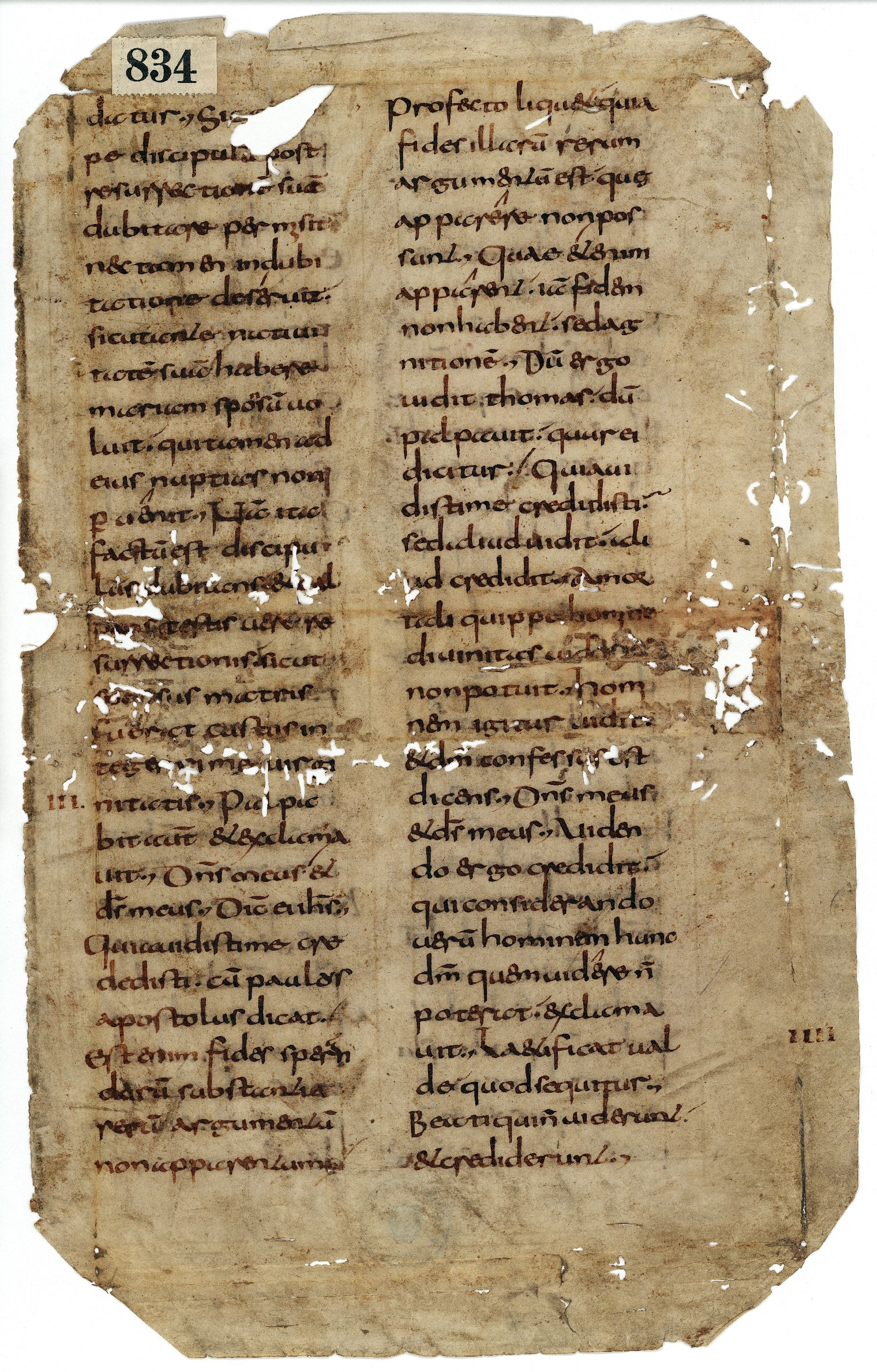
Fragment of a 9th-century Homiliarums (biblical interpretation) from Mondsee Abbey in Carolingian minuscule

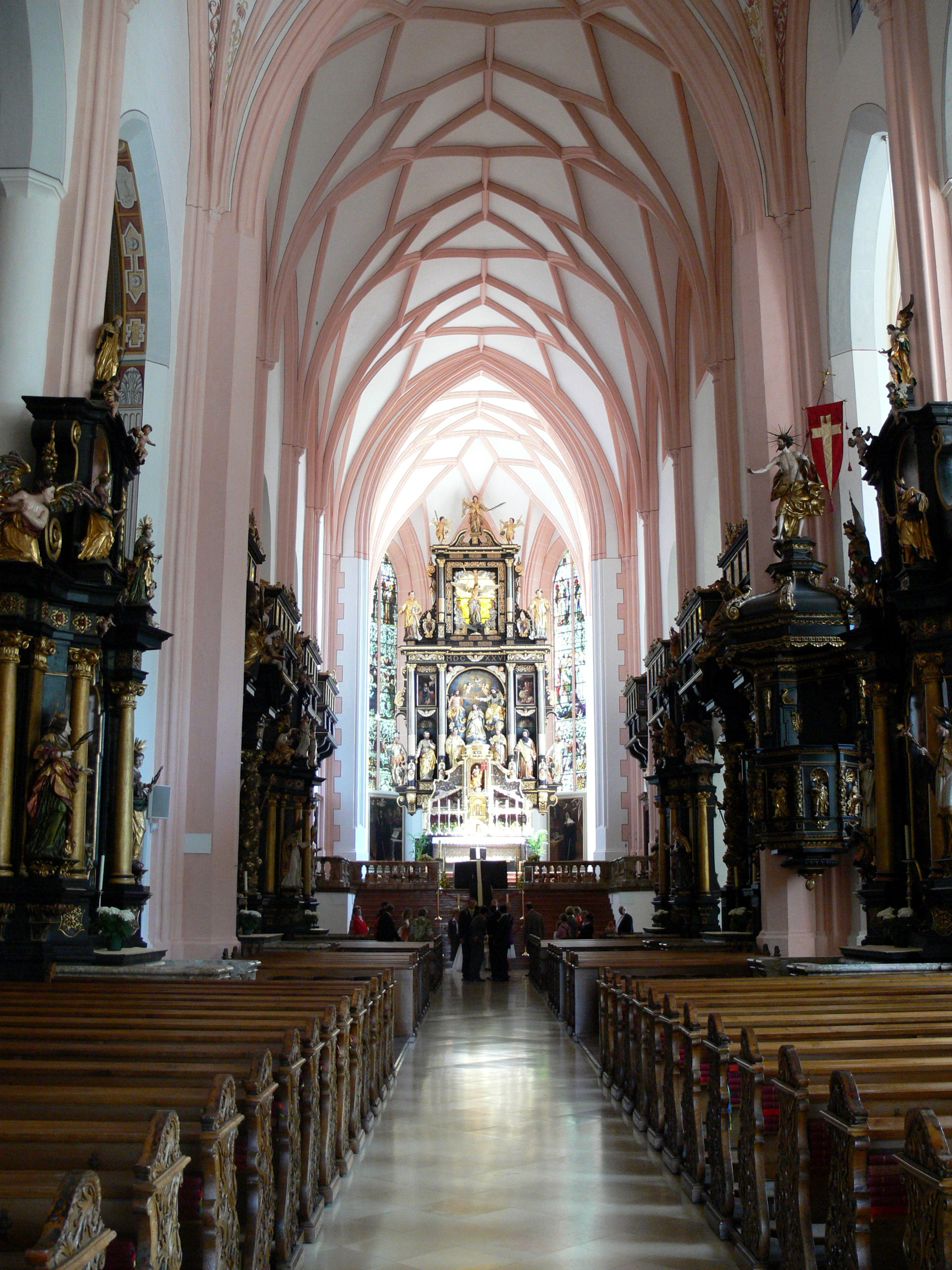
St Michael parish church in Mondsee — interior with gothic vaults (15th century)

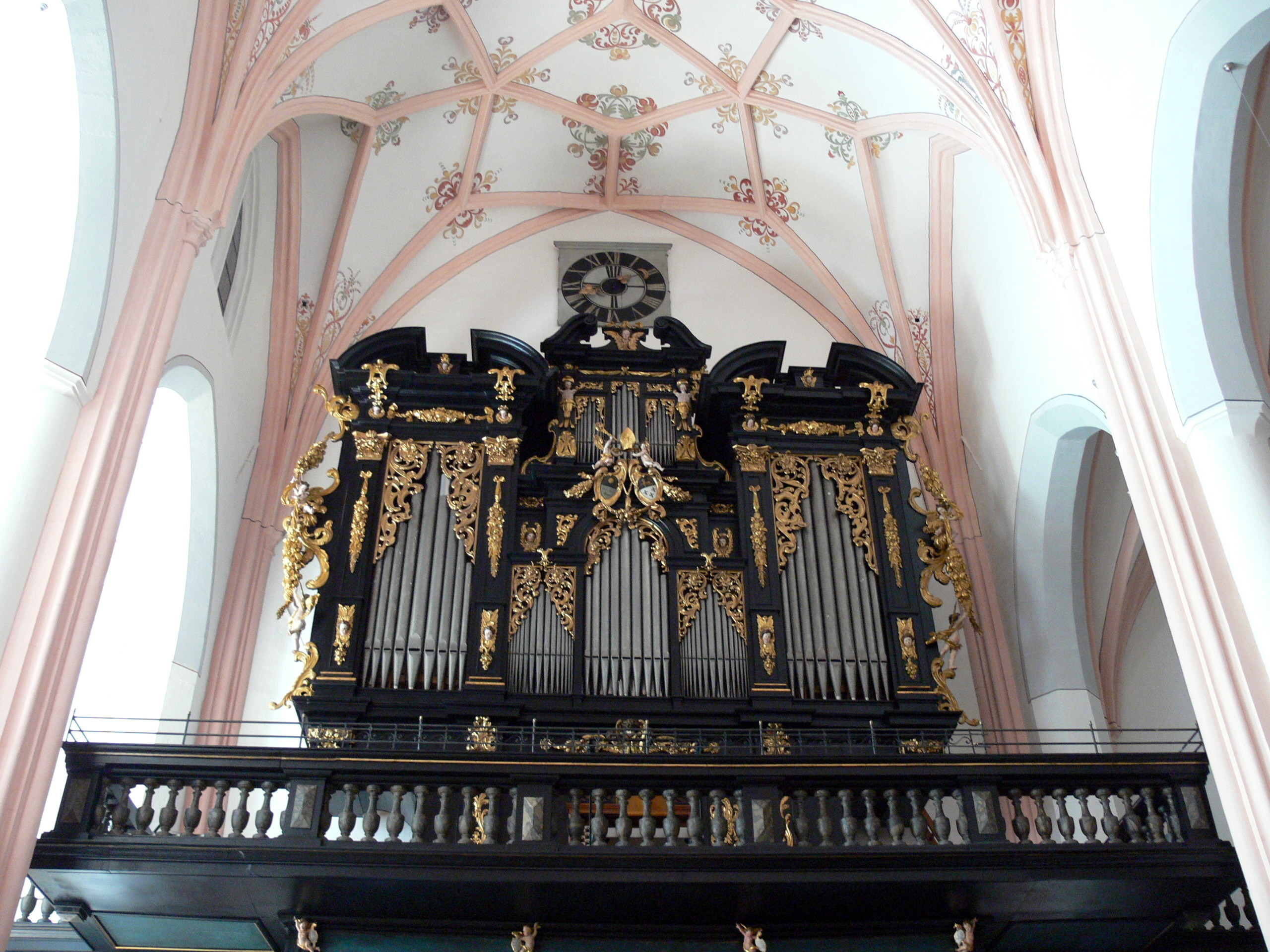
St Michael parish church in Mondsee — Organ (1674)

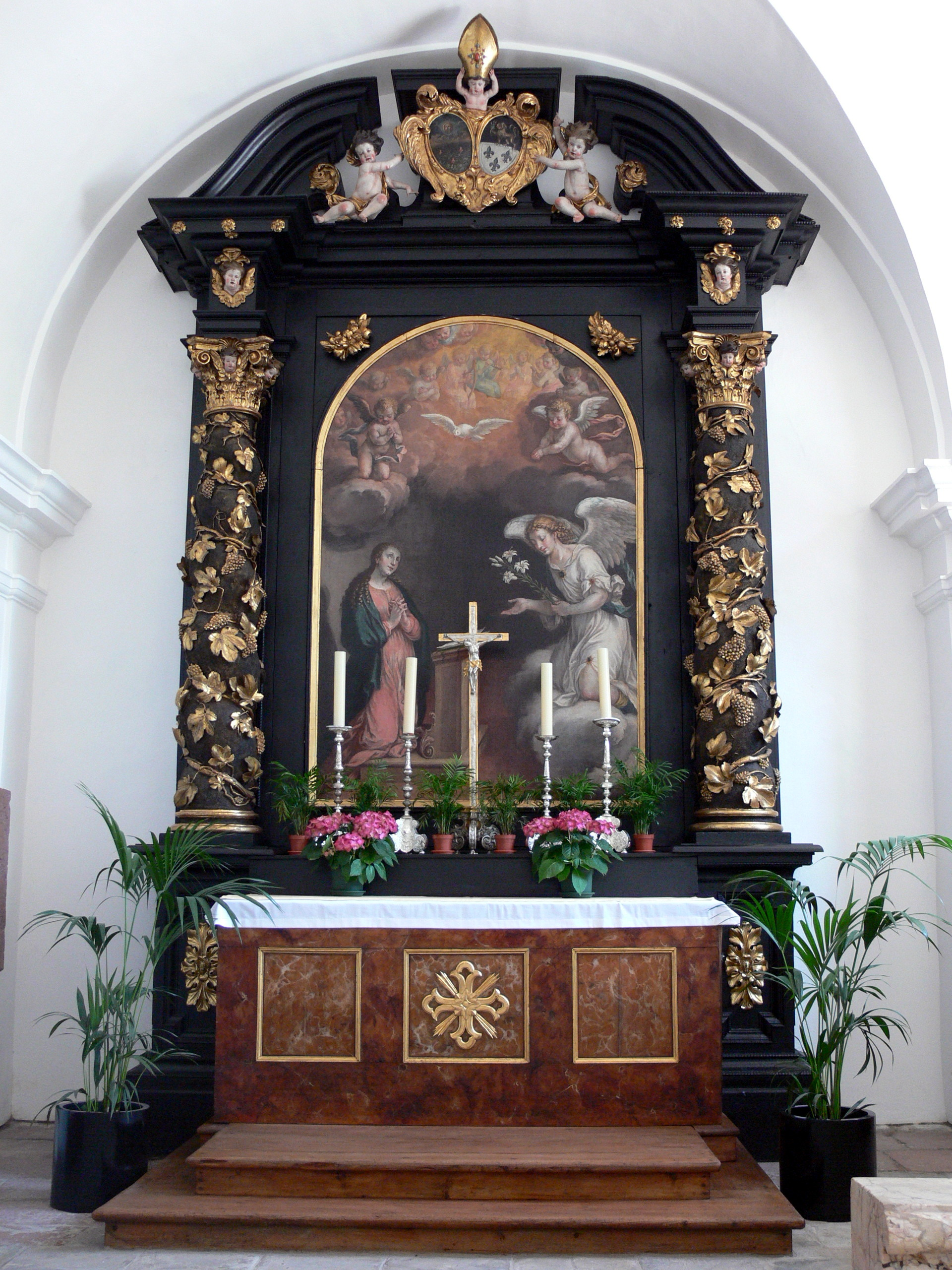
St Michael parish church in Mondsee — Altar of Annunciation (1680) by Meinrad Guggenbichler

== See also ==
- List of Carolingian monasteries
- Carolingian art
