= Martin Horký =

- Astrological map of the seven classical planets. A proponent of astrology, Horký employed astrological principles in his critique of Galileo’s astronomical discoveries.
- Born: Martin Horký; 1578; Lochovice, Bohemia, Holy Roman Empire
- Died: 1670s
- Known for: Early pamphlet criticizing the discovery of the Galilean moons
- Scientific career
- Fields: Astronomy, Astrology

Martin Horký (1578 – 1670s) was a Czech astronomer, astrologer, pamphleteer and traveler. He was notable for his early – and ultimately incorrect – criticism of Galileo Galilei's identification of the lunar mountains and Galilean moons of Jupiter. A pamphlet published by Horký, the Brevissima Peregrinatio contra Nuncium sidereum, is the first published work against a telescopic discovery.

== Biography ==
=== Early life and education ===
Horký was born in Lochovice in the Kingdom of Bohemia, to a family with a Protestant background. He travelled around Europe in pursuit of medical training, eventually moving from his native Bohemia to Germany, France and then on to Bologna in Italy; Horký became a vocal supporter of Italian academic culture, and of the Bolognese republican government. A medical student, copyist, and amateur philosopher, Horký quickly became active in the academic scene of northern Italy in the early 17th century. He also maintained some contacts in Bohemia and considered himself a follower of Johannes Kepler, the leading astronomer at the imperial court in Prague. In 1609, he was among a group of notables invited to observe objects through Galileo's new telescope at the astronomer's home in Padua. The telescope was a new invention, having been invented in the Netherlands the previous year; the novelty of the invention, coupled with a huge demand for the devices, led to the frenzied development of new telescopes. Many different craftsmen were rapidly building their own, and by 1609 Galileo was proving to be among the most successful.

In 1610, the year of the publication of Galileo's Sidereus nuncius (translatable to "Starry Messenger"), Horký was employed as a secretary and copyist to Giovanni Antonio Magini, an influential professor of mathematics at the University of Bologna. Magini, already a rival of Galileo, expressed skepticism of the claims Galileo put forward in Sidereus, and these doubts were shared by Horký. Specifically, Galileo's claims of observing lunar mountains and four satellites of Jupiter were met with intense skepticism.

In April 1610, Horký was present at a meeting of astronomers and philosophers at the Palazzo Caprara Montpensier, in which Galileo presented evidence of his identification of the satellites of Jupiter and invited the assembled notables to use his telescope. Horký reported that both Magini and Massimo Caprara were unable to see evidence of Jupiter's satellites, and ascribed Galileo's findings to distortions or tricks of the glass. In personal correspondence with Kepler, Horký would go on to claim that Galileo had suffered a nervous breakdown as a result of the failed test, implied he had contracted the "French Disease" (syphilis), and that the Paduan professor was motivated by greed and personal glory to discover new astronomical bodies.

Throughout Bologna [Galileo] has a terrible reputation: he is losing his hair; all of his skin is devastated by the 'French disease'; his skull is ruined and his mind delirious; his optic nerves have been destroyed because he has observed the minutes and seconds around Jupiter with too much curiosity and presumptuousness. He has lost his sight, hearing, taste, and touch; his hands suffer from chiragra as he has illicitly pilfered the treasure of philosophers and mathematicians; his heart suffers from palpitations because he has passed the celestial fable off to everyone; since he can no longer convince scholars and illustrious persons, his intestines have issued an unnatural tumor; and since he has wandered hither and yon, his feet show signs of gout. Blessed is the physician who can restore the sick "Nuncius" to health.

— Martin Horký, in a letter to Johannes Kepler

His aggressive criticism of Galileo continued, and by May 1610 Horký had drafted a pamphlet criticizing Galileo's practices. His views were akin to those of his employer, Magini, but the latter quickly began to distance himself from the project, seeing it as too overtly aggressive towards a fellow professor of philosophy. Horký would later try to mockingly rebut Magini's hesitance to criticize a fellow professor, stating "a fox does not bite another fox, nor does a dog bark at another dog."

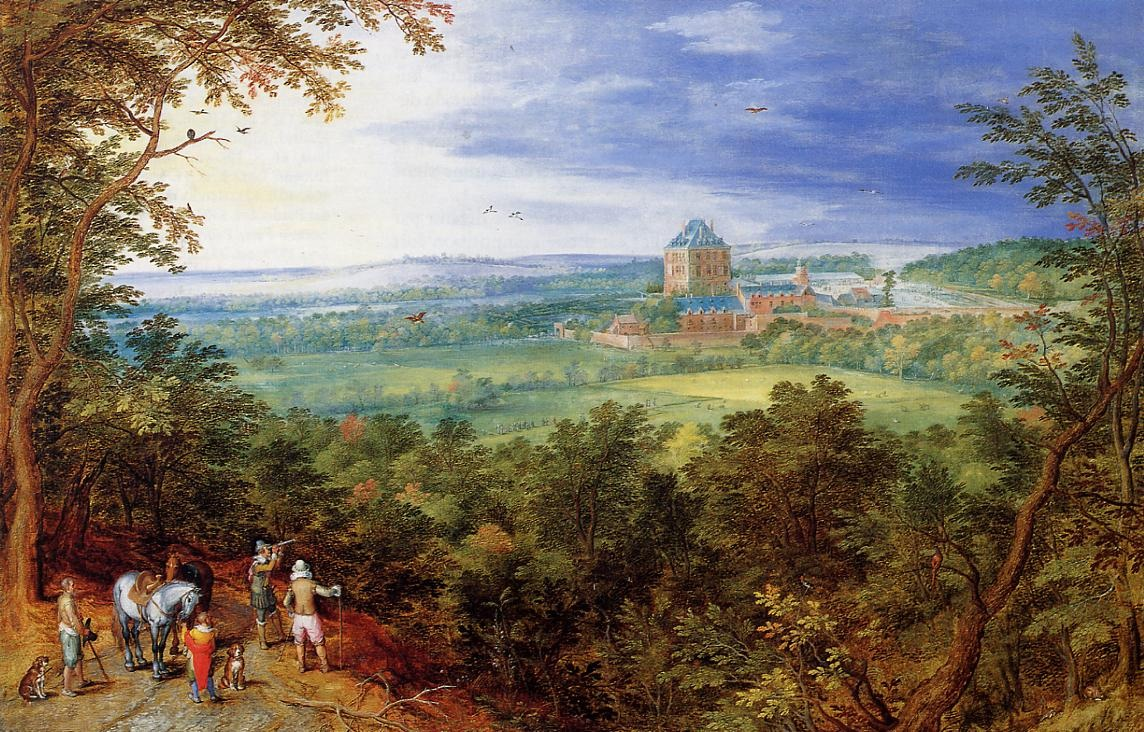
The first known depiction of a modern telescope in Bruegel the Elder's 1609 work Landscape with the Chateau de Mariemont. The invention of the first telescope in the Netherlands in 1608 set off a flurry of competition in Europe to design and market the most advanced telescope.

Initially discouraged from publishing the pamphlet by Magini, Horký persisted; eager to publish his work quickly, he travelled outside of Bolognese jurisdiction to avoid the publishing rules enforced by the Roman Inquisition and thus be able to go to print faster. In June 1610, he travelled to Modena and printed 500 copies of his pamphlet at his own expense, intent on sending his work to various European academics. His circumventing of Magini's authority led to a major falling out between the two; Magini fired Horký from his secretarial role and had him evicted. As a leading professor of the University of Bologna, Magini wielded political influence over the Bolognese city council, which was enriched by contributions from wealthy students and patrons of the college; using this influence, he convinced the city to seize Horký's possessions, but Horký fled the city before he could be arrested. Magini would later issue apologies to Galileo and other astronomers, noting that while he continued to professionally refute Galileo's discoveries, he had not been involved in Horký's pamphlet and declared the affair a "cock-up of that german of mine". The incident, however, left some of Magini's former prestige as an astronomer diminished, especially as Galileo's observations continued to gain wider acceptance.

=== Peregrinatio ===
Having been expelled from Bologna, Horký settled in Milan. Despite being deprived of Magini's financial support, his work—Brevissima Peregrinatio contra Nuncium sidereum—roughly translatable to "A very short journey against 'Starry Messenger'"—was published and distributed to notable astronomers across Europe. The pamphlet was heavily inspired by two contradictory sources: astrological principles (then considered a sister school to astronomy, now confirmed as pseudoscience) and the works of Johannes Kepler.

In his pamphlet, Horký argued that Galileo's discovery of the satellites of Jupiter (later confirmed to be the Galilean moons) and lunar mountains were provably false and misleading. From an academic standpoint, Horký also criticized Galileo's academic integrity, asking why Galileo had been the first to publish the discovery of the Jupiterian satellites and why no other astronomers had been able to corroborate the discovery. Horký implied that Galileo's lens making technique was flawed, and that this had led to him reading focal defects and distortions as astronomical bodies. To support this, Horký claimed that viewing several known stars through Galileo's telescope caused them to appear as doubles, thus indicating a flaw in the lens. He also heavily implied that Galileo's observations were driven by a personal desire for financial success and to curry political favor. The latter point was intended by Horký to deliver a political sting—Galileo had named the satellites of Jupiter the "Medician Stars" in honor of the Medici dukes of Tuscany, and it was widely speculated in contemporary Italian academic circles that Galileo was seeking to leave Padua and return to his native Tuscany with the aid of his former student, Cardinal Giovanni di Medici.

To give credibility to his work, Horký cited Kepler as a major inspiration in his pamphlet. Specify, he cited Kepler's 1610 pamphlet Dissertatio cum Nuncio as having shown Galileo's observations of lunar mountains and satellites of Jupiter to be false. However, Horký's citation of Kepler's work (page 34 of Dissertatio, on which Kepler posits theories for why the moons of Jupiter could be seen as varying in size) was later rebutted by Kepler himself, and Horký's opinions are now believed to have been a result of him not understanding Kepler's publication.

In addition to academic criticism, Horky's work heavily played into the astrological principles of "Peregrenatio", which highly valued earthly wandering as a means to attain mental perfection; in this mindset, Horký and other astrologers considered "false" discoveries of new celestial bodies as being poisonous distractions, and disruptive to existing theories of astrology. The discovery of new astronomic bodies would also upset the idea of the seven "classical planets"; many astrologers saw the number Seven as being associated with stability, creativity, and mystery. In an era of gradually-tightening scientific standards, proponents of astrology used the seven observable planets as a way to bridge the widening scientific gap between astrology and astronomy—thus, Galileo's efforts to discover new astronomical bodies that would disrupt this relationship was looked on with strong disfavor.

==== Flaws ====
Horký's arguments in Peregrinatio were ultimately flawed; Galileo's telescopes had been tested by the government of Venice the year before, and were found to be more accurate than many of his Italian contemporaries. Galileo's observations of the Jupiterian moons was also supported by their alleged independent discovery by German astronomer Simon Marius in early 1610 (Galileo would later accuse Marius of plagiarism, a charge debated by modern historians).

=== Reception and rebuttal by Kepler ===
Despite the flaws in Peregrinatio, Horký's work received a mixed reception, and was even positively viewed by some 17th century academics. In Galileo's native Tuscany, the influential Don Giovanni de' Medici was an ardent supporter of astrology, and so the duchy and its capital city of Florence became a stronghold of pro-astrology, anti-Galilean support. Horký was in contact with a cluster of Florentines – a Vallombrosan monk (Orazio Morandi), Francesco Sizzi (later famed for discovering the movement of sunspots), an anonymous secretary, and Lodovico delle Colombe (a prominent Aristotelian physicist who would later push for Galileo to be investigated for heresy) – that readily supported his work. Horký was enthusiastic that his pamphlet would be well received in Tuscany, even going to far as to make an astrological reading predicting the downfall of the "father of the Nuncius".

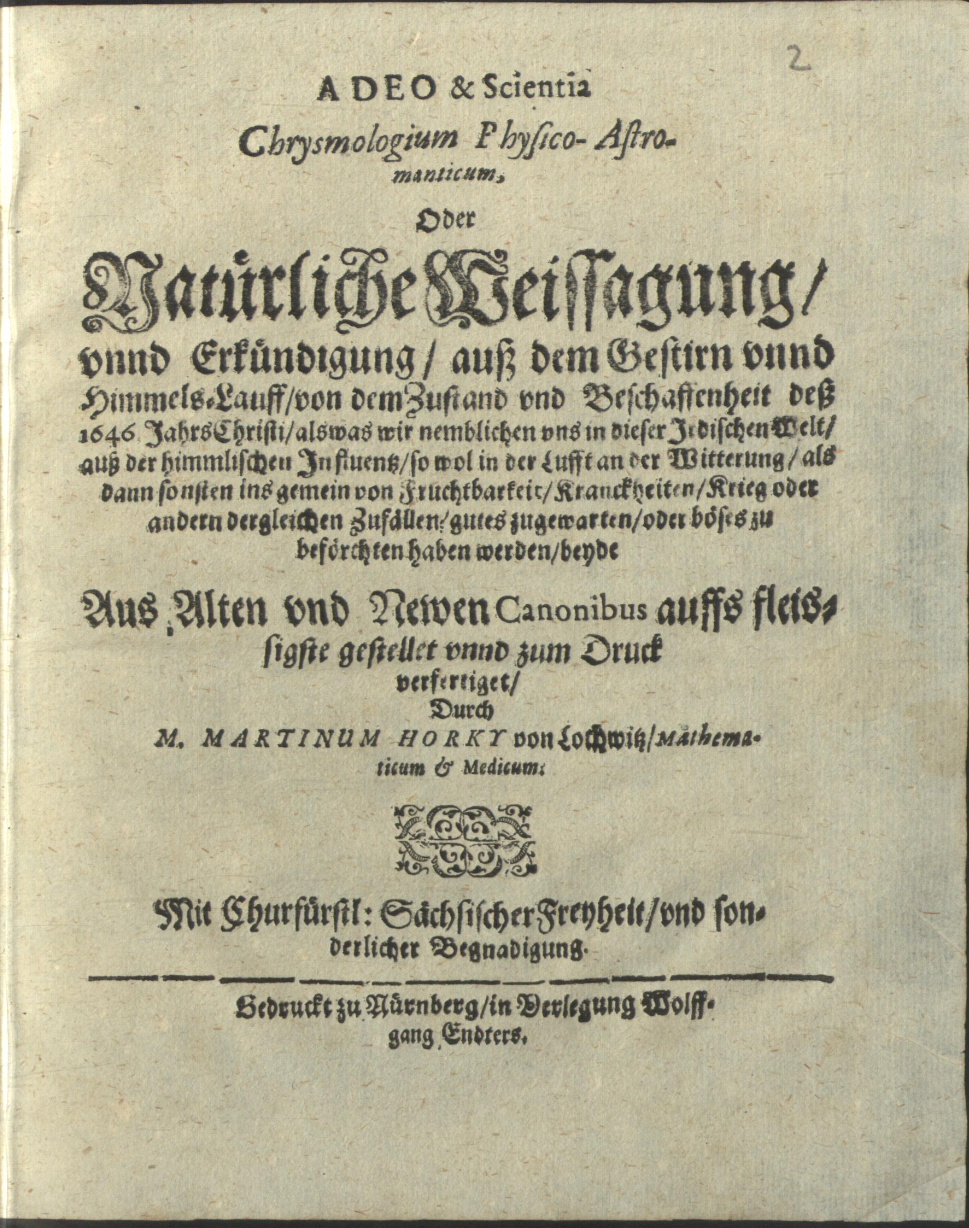
Cover of Chrysmologium Physico-Astromanticum, a series of astrological almanacs published by Horký between 1639 and 1645

In Horký's native Bohemia, the pamphlet was met with a cooler response. It received a positive note from Michael Maestlin, Kepler's mentor, who hoped that the pamphlet would "fell Galileo upon his own sword". However, Kepler himself was immediately critical of Horký, not the least because Horky's pamphlet had mischaracterized Kepler's own work. Kepler dismissed the claims in the Peregrinatio in a letter to Galileo later in 1610, describing them as "disgraceful pages that are simply a waste of time". He wrote to Horký, advising him that, given his family were known Bohemian protestants, he should leave Spanish-controlled Milan as soon as possible, now that his name was being spread around in print. Horký never received the letter, and upon his return to Prague in October of 1610, he requested a meeting with Kepler to discuss his ideas. Having been travelling and thus not received Kepler's earlier rebuke of his pamphlet, Horký was caught badly off-balance by Kepler's negative reaction. Kepler eventually convinced Horký to retract his views and issue a public apology to Galileo, and Horký would not work in astronomy again.

Galileo himself never issued a response to Horký; Kepler's stern response to his mis-quoted work, coupled with two powerful rebuttals (one written by Scottish astronomer John Wedderburn and another by Italian astronomer Giovanni Antonio Roffeni), ended notable discourse surrounding Horký's pamphlet. The differences between the reception of Horký's work in Italy and Bohemia is seen by some sources as reflecting the increasing nationalist divides in 17th century Europe, as a heavily catholic, Spanish-dominated Italy entered into conflict with a religiously fractured Bohemia and Germany.

== Later life ==
Horký continued to pursue a career in medicine in Prague, where his lived until 1615. The following year, he was appointed to the Holy Roman embassy to the Ottoman Empire in Istanbul. In 1619 he returned to Bohemia, but with the spread of the Thirty Years' War, he was expelled. He authored a medical pamphlet on how to avoid the plague in Rostock in 1624, and then moved to Hamburg in the 1630s. From 1639 to 1645, Horký wrote and printed a series of astrological almanacs that attained some readership. He published a number of satirical astrological prophecies until his death sometime in the 1670s.

== Published works ==
- Brevissima Peregrinatio contra Nuncium sidereum (1610)
- Chrysmologium Physico-Astromanticum (1639–1645)
