= Giovanni Battista Bissoni =

Italian painter (1576–1636)

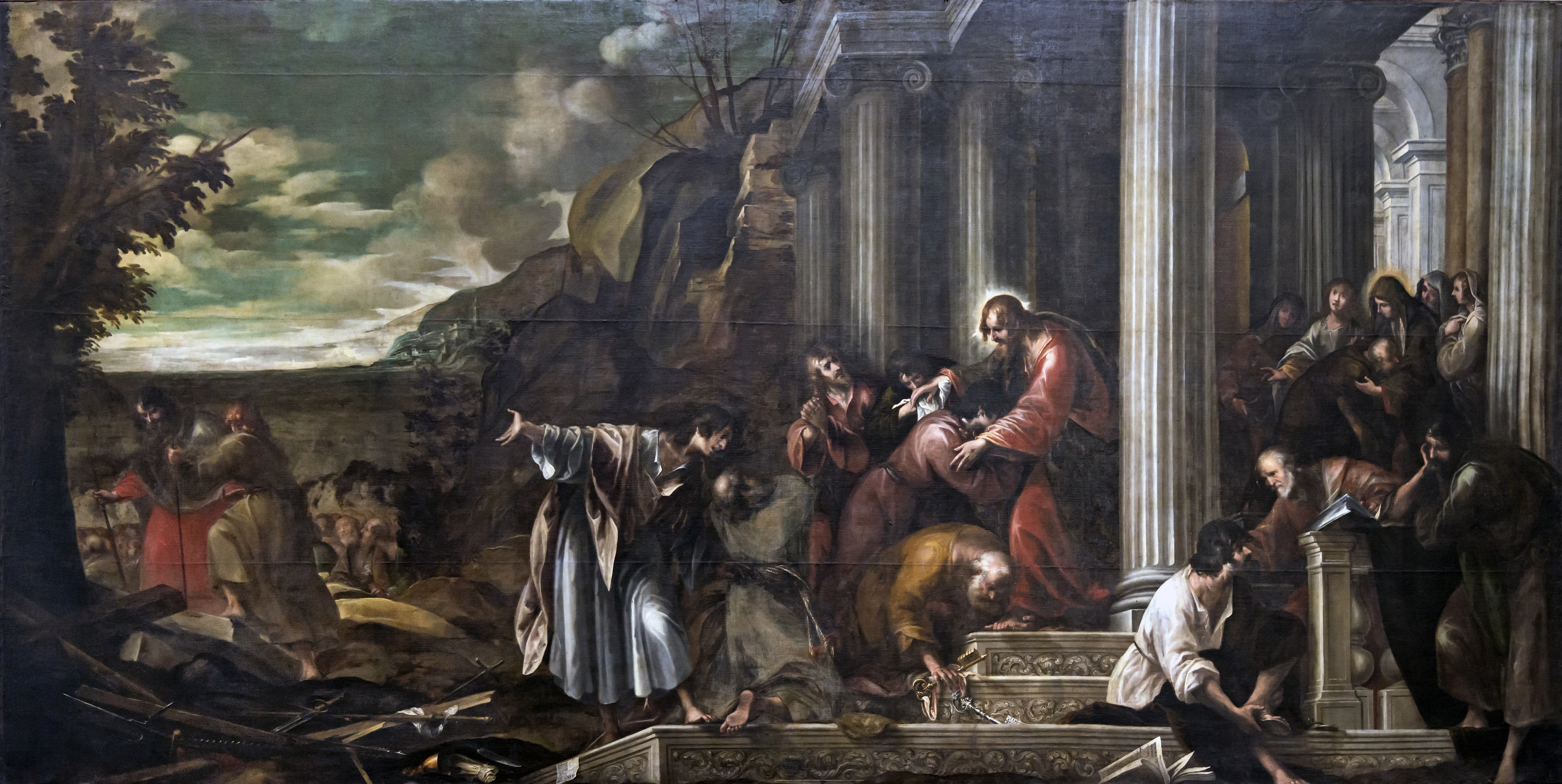
The mission of the Apostles Abbey of Santa Giustina

Giovanni Battista Bissoni (1576–1636) was an Italian painter. He was born in Padua. He was first a pupil of Francesco Apollodoro, called Il Porcia, a portrait painter, and afterwards of Dario Varotari the Elder. Bissoni painted for the churches and convents at Padua and Ravenna. In the refectory of the convent of San Vitale, he painted a Last Supper.
