= Marc'Antonio Mazzoleni =

Italian engineer (died 1632)

Marc'Antonio Mazzoleni (date of birth unknown – died 1632) was a Paduan instrument maker best known for his association with Galileo Galilei, for whom Mazzoleni produced instruments including Galileo's military compasses and other instruments.

== Biography ==
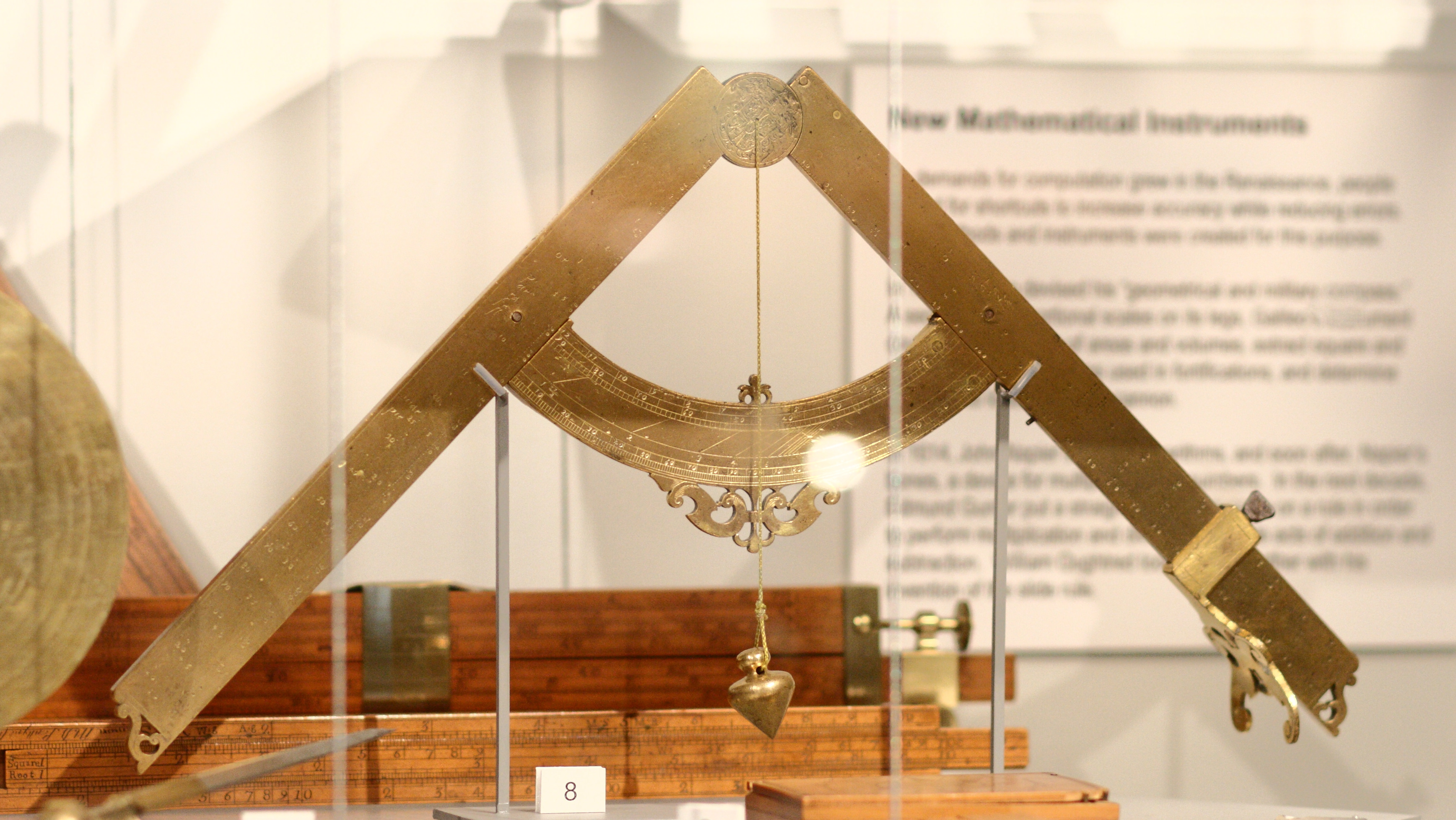
Galileo's geometrical and military compass, thought to have been made c. 1604 by Mazzoleni

Marc'Antonio Mazzoleni was the son of Paolo Mazzoleni, of the Mazzoleni family of Paduan clockmakers, and Marietta Bazi. Marc'Antonio's uncle Francesco operated a successful artisan workshop in Padua. Marc'Antonio's older brother Mario was to hold the chair in Natural Philosophy at the University of Padua, a position that he held for thirty-six years.

Mazzoleni had been working as an instrument maker at the Arsenale in Venice when, in 1597, Galileo hired him as his personal instrument maker. In 1599, Mazzoleni, his wife, and his daughter moved into Galileo's home in Padua, where Galileo was teaching at the University of Padua. (Mazzoleni's wife became Galileo's cook and housekeeper.)

Both during the four years he lived in Galileo's household and thereafter, Mazzoleni constructed instruments for Galileo, notably the military compass that Galileo invented and sold (along with an instruction manual written by Galileo). Mazzoleni would build more than 100 of these compasses for Galileo. Mazzoleni also helped Galileo produce other instruments, including hydrostatic balances, air thermometers, magnets and magnetic compasses for ships, and various kinds of drawing compasses for engineers and architects. For his services, Galileo paid Mazzoleni a meager salary of six crowns per year (in addition to room and board).

Mazzoleni continued to work with Galileo even after the latter's return to Florence in 1610. In 1612, Mazzoleni became regulator of the clock of the University of Padua's Palazzo del Bo'.

Mazzoleni died of the plague in 1632.
