= Galileo Bonaiuti =

Italian physician (1370–1450)

- Born: c. 1370; Florence
- Died: 1450; Florence
- Resting place: Basilica of Santa Croce
- Education: University of Florence
- Occupations: Physician, Professor of Medicine, Governing Counselman.
- Known for: Ancestor of Galileo Galilei

Galileo Bonaiuti (c. 1370 in Florence – 1450 in Florence) was an Italian doctor and member of the Florentine governing council, successful in his time but most noteworthy as the ancestor from whom Galileo Galilei drew both his given and family names.

== Biography ==
Bonaiuti practiced medicine in Florence in the 15th century, taught medicine at the University of Florence, and was on the governing council of the Republic of Florence, a powerful position on a par (domestically) with being a member of the US senate, today. He was buried in the Basilica of Santa Croce, roughly halfway between where Michelangelo and his own descendant, Galileo, would be interred.

While officially retaining the Bonaiuti surname for generations, the family began referring to itself by the surnames Galilei or Galileo in his honor around the time he was alive. This is the likely source of his descendant's own name, influenced by the inscription on his tomb in the Basilica; Galileo Bonaiuti was referred to as Magister Galileus de Galileis, olim Bonaiutis ("Professor Galileo of Galilei, of the Bonaiuti family").
