= Francesco Sizzi =

Italian astronomer

Francesco Sizzi, an Italian astronomer who lived during the 17th century, is credited with being the first to notice the annual movement of sunspots.

He also argued against the existence of the Galilean satellites of Jupiter, discovered by Galileo in 1610. In 1611, he published a book, Dianoia astronomica, optica, physica, qua Syderei Nuncij rumor de quatuor planetis à Galilaeo Galilaeo mathematico celeberrimo recens perspicillì cuiusdam ope conspectis, vanus redditur. Auctore Francisco Sitio Florentino, (in Latin; approximate translation of its title: "Discussion of astronomy, optics, physics, where a rumor in Sidereus Nuncius about four planets, something recently observed with a telescope by the very notable mathematician Galileo Galilei, is shown to be unfounded. By author Francesco Sizzi the Florentine. "). His main argument was an astrological one (book page 16). In the macrocosm, there are seven planets: two favorable (beneficas) ones, two unfavorable (maleficas) ones, two luminaries, and unique Mercury, erratic and indifferent (vagum & indifferens). In the microcosm, the human head has seven openings: two nostrils, two eyes, two ears, and one mouth. Because of numerous other sets of seven that they correspond to, sets that would be almost too tedious to mention, there is no place for the extra planets that Galileo had claimed to have discovered. So they do not exist.

One of these sets of seven is the seven metals (book page 25). The Sun: gold, the Moon: silver, Venus: copper, Jupiter: tin, Mars: iron, Saturn: lead, and Mercury: quicksilver, to use a non-astrological name for that metal.
