= Francesco Porcia =

Italian painter (1531–1612)

Francesco Porcia or Francesco Apollodoro (Porcia in the Friuli, 1531 - Padua, 1612) was an Italian painter, chiefly of portraits in Padua. He is suspected to have been the son or grandson of the painter Paolino Apollodoro.

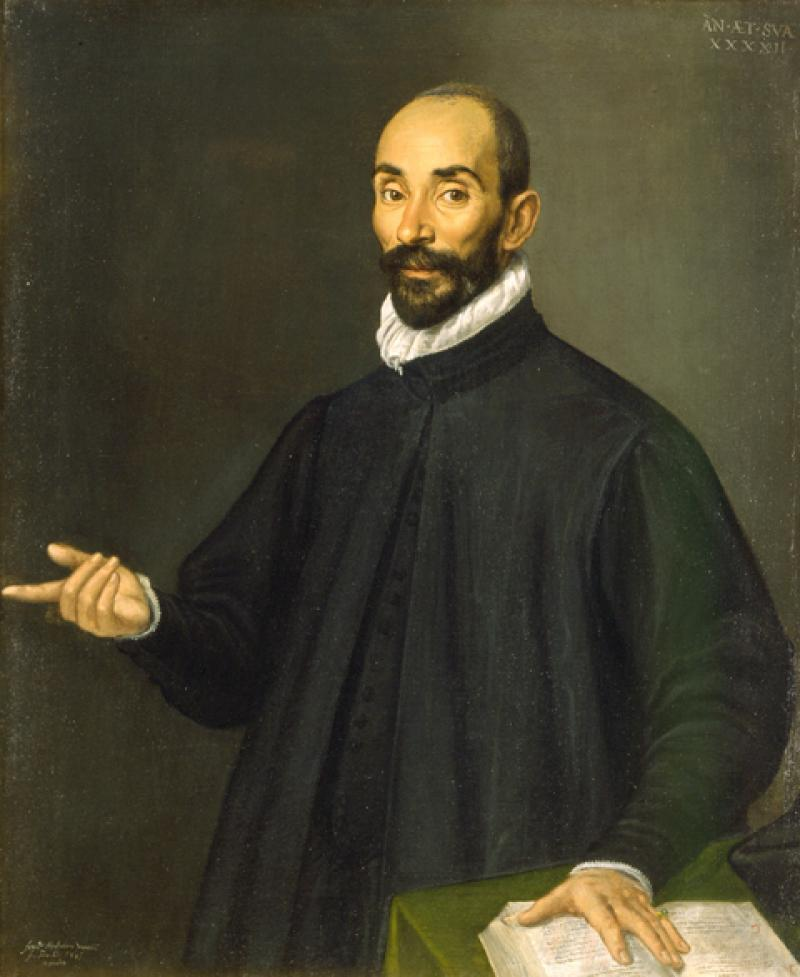
Portrait of Ercole Bazzani - Museo Poldi Pezzoli - Milan.
