= Niccolò Arrighetti =

Italian intellectual and pupil and associate of Galileo

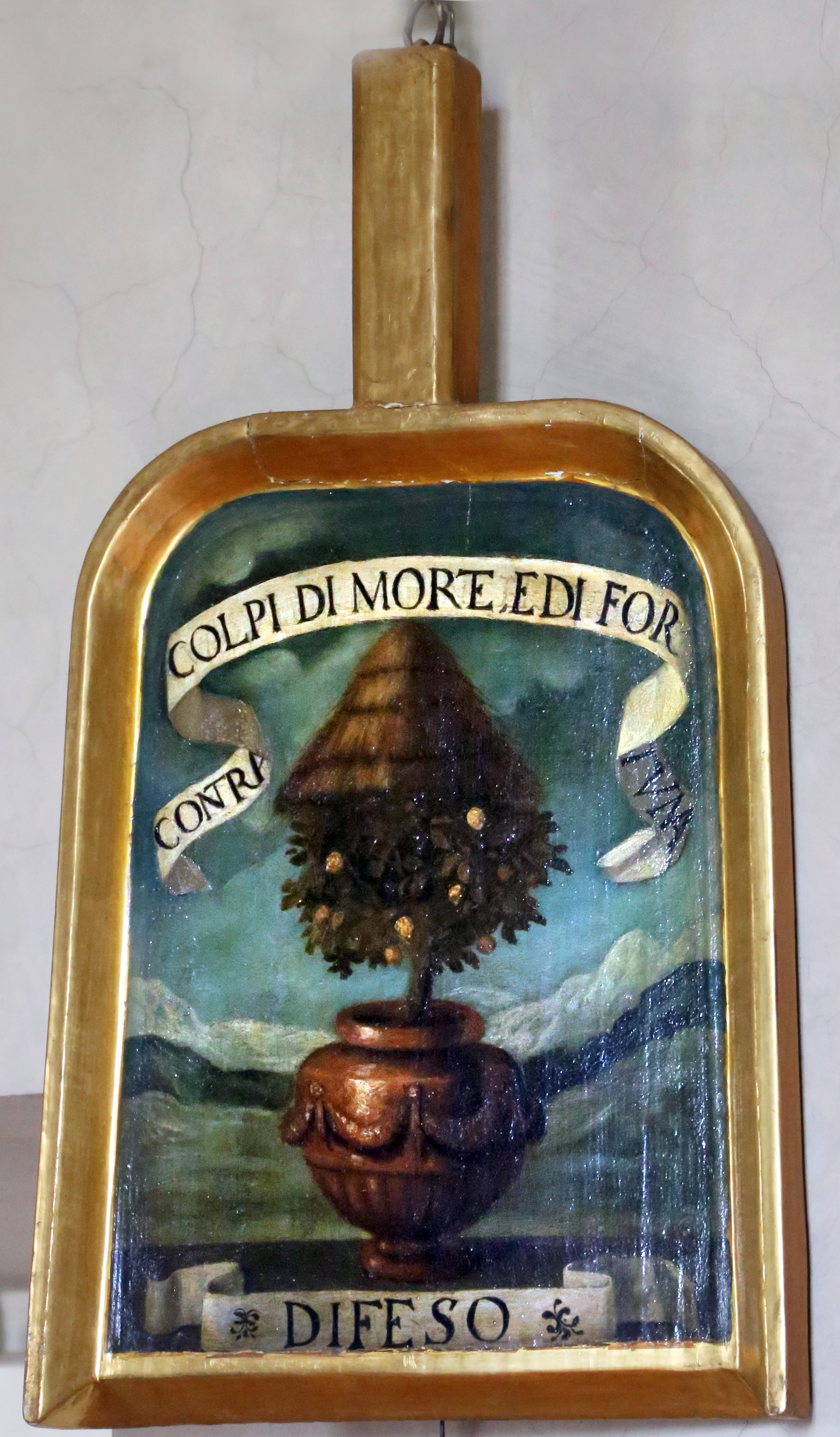
Niccolò Arrighetti's ceremonial 'bran shovel' in the Accademia della Crusca showing his club pseudonym 'Difeso'

Niccolò Arrighetti (11 November 1586, in Florence – 29 May 1639, in Florence) was an Italian intellectual, pupil and associate of Galileo Galilei.

== Relationship with Galileo ==
The son of Francesco Arrighetti and Fiammetta Ginori, as a young man he was a private student of Galileo’s, together with his cousin Andrea Arrighetti. Around 1614, Arrighetti assisted Galileo in replying to an attack by Giorgio Coresio on his views of the behaviour of bodies in water. Arrighetti maintained a close interest in Galileo’s experiments in physics and his mathematical work (notably on the flow of water in both straight and twisting channels). It was also Arrighetti who brought Galileo news from Benedetto Castelli about the dispute between Castelli and Cosimo Boscaglia, that prompted Galileo to write his Letter to Benedetto Castelli. A number of Galileo’s notes, sketches and drawings on various topics, including motion, were recorded or copied by Arrighetti.

== Other scholarly interests ==
Arrighetti was a member of the main Florentine academies and delivered some notable orations at the Accademia della Crusca in praise of Filippo Salviati and of Cosimo II, Grand Duke of Tuscany. In 1623 he succeeded Galileo as consul of the Accademia Fiorentina after having previously served as a councillor three times. He was also consul of the Accademia delle Arti del Disegno.

It was probably as a result of a petition from Arrighetti that Prince Leopoldo de' Medici and Grand Duke Ferdinando II decided to refound that Platonic Academy which had been the pride of fifteenth-century Florence. Arrighetti devoted a great deal of his studies to the work of Plato, and worked on translations of his Dialogues.

He also had wide literary interests and wrote an unpublished work, Oeconomicus in which he emphasised the importance of teaching being conducted in a secluded or composed environment as well as comic monologues ('cicalate') 'on the cucumber' and 'on the cake.' His manuscript works included essays on philosophy, dramas, comedies and poetry.

Arrighetti died in Florence on May 29, 1639 and was buried in San Marco.
