= Tommaso Caccini =

Italian Dominican friar (1574–1648)

Tommaso Caccini (1574–1648) was an Italian Dominican friar and preacher.

Born in Florence as Cosimo Caccini, he entered into the Dominican Order of the Catholic Church as a teenager. Caccini began his career in the monastery of San Marco and gradually became renowned for his passionate sermons. He frequently preached at the Church of Santa Maria Novella in Florence, which would later be the site of his most famous sermon. Some historians, however, speculate that the motives behind Caccini's sermons were questionable because "his fanaticism was never divorced from personal ambition for advancement within the Dominican order." Perhaps one indication of Caccini's desire for success is reflected by his decision to be named as "Tommaso," which is thought to be in honor of Thomas Aquinas. Aquinas was best known for his views on theology and philosophy, and he often discussed the effects of philosophy on Church doctrine. Historical accounts suggest that unlike his namesake, Father Caccini was hardly interested in balancing theology with philosophical ideals. In fact, Caccini's highly controversial sermons, which often vilified critics of Church doctrine, eventually resulted in discipline by the Archbishop of Bologna.

== The Pigeon League ==
In Florence, Caccini became a member of a group known as the "Pigeon League", named after Lodovico delle Colombe.

Colombe was reputed to be one of the first individuals in the Church to attempt to derail Galileo Galilei's scientific endeavors. Another famous member of the Pigeon League was Niccolò Lorini, who often utilized references to Scripture in his fiercely critical sermons against Galileo.

Colombe denounced Galileo's discussion of Copernican theory, soon after Galileo confirmed several celestial discoveries in 1609. Lorini followed by issuing a scathing sermon in 1613 responding to Galileo's Letters on Solar Spots. Soon after Lorini's sermon, Galileo issued a response, known as the Letter to Benedetto Castelli. The Letter attempted to demonstrate that Copernican theory and the Book of Joshua were not mutually exclusive. Caccini saw the Letter to Castelli as an opportunity to discredit Galileo and his followers even further.

== Sermon at Santa Maria Novella ==
On December 20, 1614, Caccini issued a sermon at the Santa Maria Novella in Florence strongly opposing Galileo's support of Copernican theory. While the exact text of the sermon is not clear, historians suggest that Caccini preached that mathematics and science were contrary to the word of the Bible, and therefore, heretical. Although Caccini appeared to have criticized mathematics and science generally, he singled out Galileo and his followers. He made a point to utilize the biblical phrase, "Ye Men of Galilee, why stand you gazing up in heaven?" (in the Latin version found in the Vulgate: Viri Galilaei, quid statis aspicientes in caelum?). The phrase can be found in Acts 1:11. The phrase refers to the inhabitants of Galilee who gazed into the sky expecting Jesus to return as he made his way to heaven. Caccini attempted to play on the words of the passage by starkly contrasting Galileo's allegedly heretical acts to the unwavering faith of the inhabitants of Galilee.

=== Reaction ===
The reaction to Caccini's sermon ranged from vocal opposition to praise. Galileo himself is said to have described Caccini as an individual "of very great ignorance, no less a mind full of venom and devoid of charity." Within the Church itself, there was substantial disagreement over how to address Caccini's scathing sermon. Matteo Caccini, Tommaso Caccini's own brother and former prior of a monastery in Cortona, was appalled by Caccini's sermon in Florence. He stated: "I am so angry that I could not be more...[Father Tommaso] revealed such dreadful plans I could scarcely control myself. In any event, I wash my hands of him forever and ever." The preacher general of the Dominican order echoed Matteo Caccini's sentiments in a letter he issued to Galileo. Apologizing on behalf of the Order, he lamented that: "[he had] to answer for all the idiocies" that his fellow brothers perpetrated.

== Testimony in Rome ==
Despite opposition from relatively high-ranking members in the Dominican order towards Caccini's views, some historians speculate that Caccini's sermon was the catalyst for the trial of Galileo that took place in Rome in 1615. By the time the Holy Office called Caccini to testify against Galileo, he was residing at the Roman convent of Santa Maria sopra Minerva. Caccini was an alumnus of the College of St. Thomas, having become Master and Bachelor there. On March 20, 1615, in front of several high-ranking officials within the Church, Caccini testified regarding his sermon and his knowledge of Galileo and his followers. Caccini stated that following his sermon, he reported to the Father Inquisitor in Florence that Galileo's supporters should be disciplined for their "petulant minds." Caccini accused Galileo's followers of making blasphemous statements that questioned God's existence and the Church's declaration that miracles were acts performed by saints. Caccini went on to state that the notion that the earth travels around the sun was offensive to the Scripture, which declared the earth motionless.

In addition to discussing his activities following the sermon, examiners asked Caccini to discuss his opinions regarding Galileo and his followers. Despite the fact that Caccini clearly despised Galileo's teachings, he attempted to act diplomatically when asked about Galileo's character. He openly noted that Galileo had been regarded as "a good Catholic" by many. Nonetheless, Caccini demonstrated his disapproval of Galileo's views subtly in his closing statement. When asked if he had any hostility towards Galileo or his followers, Caccini responded "...I do not have any hostility towards Galileo...or toward [the] disciples of Galileo. Rather I pray to God for them."

== After the trial ==
While Caccini hoped that his claims would encourage Rome to act against Galileo, his testimony was met with mixed reviews. Most of his claims were disregarded by the Church with the exception of the claim that Galileo's Letter on Sunspots was heretical. In 1616, following an examination of the Letter, the Holy Office issued a report that the notion of a stationary sun was heretical. The Holy Office further enjoined Galileo on February 26, 1616 from teaching or defending the notion that the earth revolved around a stationary sun.

After giving his testimony in 1615, Caccini used his opposition to Galileo as a vehicle to achieve his ambitious professional goals. Gradually his career progressed in Rome, and he eventually became the prior of the monastery of San Marco where he continued to assist in the prosecution of Galileo. Caccini died at the age of 74 in Florence in 1648.
