= Boscaglia =

Boscaglia is an Italian surname. Notable people with the surname include:

- Clara Boscaglia (1930–1990), Sammarinese politician
- Cosimo Boscaglia (c. 1550–1621), Italian philosopher
- Roberto Boscaglia (born 1968), Italian footballer and manager
