= Filippo Salviati =

Italian nobleman, scientist and friend of Galileo (1583–1614)

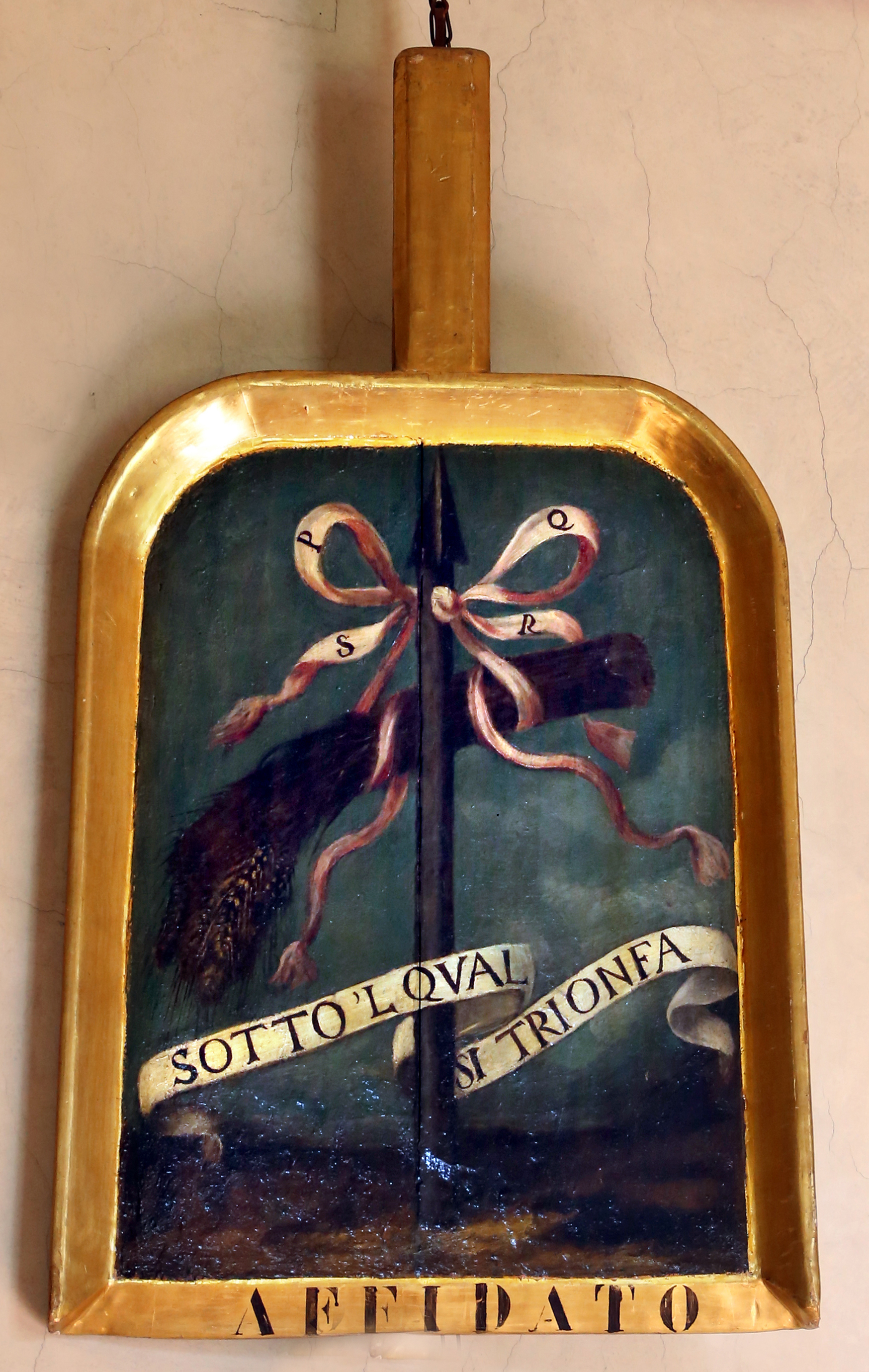
Ceremonial spade of the Accademia della Crusca belonging to 'Affidato' (Filippo Salviati)

Filippo Vincenzo Romolo Salviati (29 January 1583 (Florence) – 22 March 1614 (Barcelona)) was an Italian nobleman, scientist and friend of Galileo. He is remembered today mainly because he appears as one of the figures in Galileo's controversial work the Dialogue Concerning the Two Chief World Systems (1632).

== Family background and early life ==
Salviati was the son of Averardo di Filippo and Alessandra di Giovambattista Nerli, who died shortly after his birth. His family was wealthy and powerful, related to of the grand dukes of Tuscany by numerous marriages; Cosimo de' Medici, son of Maria Salviati, was the cousin of his grandfather, Senator Filippo Salviati, who in turn was married to the uterine sister of Pope Leo XI.

Filippo was taught grammar, Latin, geometry and mathematics by a tutor, but his real loves were horsemanship, appearing in tournaments, fencing, hunting, and swimming, He also loved music and was a proficient player of several instruments. In 1595, on the death of his father, he became a pupil of his uncle Antonio, who began training him in the family's business. On 5 September 1602 he married Ortensia, daughter of Francesco Guadagni and Laura Bandini; their marriage was agreed and sponsored by the Grand Duke and Cardinal Medici. On 28 August 1603 their only daughter Alessandra was born, who died on 31 October 1610.

At court, Salviati took part in the celebrations for the wedding of Marie de' Medici Maria Medici with Henry IV of France in 1600. In 1608, he took part in the preparation of the festive games for the wedding of Prince Cosimo with Maria Maddalena of Austria. As part of these, following a mock naval combat entitled The Argonauts the bride was offered precious minerals from an allegorical rock of Arno. In the same year, he was the chaperone of prince Francesco de' Medici (1594–1614) during the ballet-spectacle of the Giostra de' venti.

== Intellectual development ==
From the second half of 1606, Salviati began to immerse himself in study: for ten hours a day he kept himself away from other people and neglected his usual activities, buying many books. He first perfected his knowledge of Greek and Latin through the reading of the classics, initially under the guidance of Giulio Libri, member of the Accademia della Crusca with the nickname 'Abburattato' ('Sifted'), However he soon abandoned these Peripatetic teachings and embraced the views of Copernicus and the new natural philosophy.

After a long period of disputes with his uncle he finally decided, in 1610, to withdraw from involvement in the family business in order to devote his time to natural philosophy. On 7 July 1610 Salviati himself became a member of the Accademia della Crusca (founded by his ancestor Lionardo Salviati) with the nickname of 'Affidato' ('Trusted') His ceremonial membership spade bears the image of a Roman spearhead from which hangs a bundle of wheat with the motto "sotto 'l qual si trionfa" taken from a line in Petrarch's Canzone XLIX ('O solid shield for the oppressed peoples / against the blows of Death and Fortune / under whom we triumph'). He contributed to the successful completion of the Vocabolario degli Accademici della Crusca, as the major financier of the first printing in 1612.

== Collaboration with Galileo ==
By 1610 Salviati's close relationship with Galileo Galilei was also firmly established. In July 1611, Salviati's Florence residence in via del Palagio was chosen as the location for an experimental competition between Galileo and the Aristotelian Lodovico delle Colombe about the physics of floating bodies. From January 1611, he hosted Galileo for long periods in his villa Le Selve in Lastra a Signa, where Galileo continued his observations on the 'Medicean planets' and developed his theories on sunspots. This led to the writing of the three famous letters to Marcus Welser (Letters on Sunspots, 1613). As their relationship developed, Galileo sponsored and supported Salviati's membership of the Accademia dei Lincei in September 1612. In 1617 Federico Cesi, founder of the Lincei, married Salviati's cousin Isabella.

== Feud with the Medici ==
At the same time as Salviati was assisting Galileo, he became involved in an unusual dispute with some of the Medici family. On 26 April the carriage of Don Bernardetto de' Medici was taking part in a procession ordered by rank on the Via Romana when it was overtaken by an anonymous carriage. This later turned out to be Salviati's, although he was not present and it was occupied by friends of his. The Medici responded by sending their servants to chase the carriage down and insult the occupants on the public street with threats of a beating. The offense worsened the next day when the same group, again without Salviati, threatened the staff of Bernardetto's brother the abbott Ottaviano de' Medici. Don Ottaviano was gravely offended, and this was the origin of long-standing rancour against Salviati. Despite the intervention of many influential intermediaries the matter could not be satisfactorily resolved.

In November 1611 the Grand Duke himself tried to reconcile the parties, but as he made his way to the agreed meeting, Salviati was attacked and wounded by Don Ottaviano's men. On 2 January 1612 the Grand Duke finally managed to arrange peace by imposing perpetual silence concerning the matter on both parties. Salviati immediately left for Le Selve with Galileo. Berdardetto and Ottaviano de' Medici, dissatisfied with the agreed truce, ordered Salviati's murder, sending assassins from the kingdom of Naples. Their plan was discovered and Salviati had grilles placed over the windows of Le Selve.

In 1613 a complaint against Salviati was received by the Holy Office. Perhaps warned, on 23 October 1613 Salviati left Florence suddenly, never to return. He travelled across northern Italy, meeting scholars and influential people, telling them about Galileo's discoveries. In November he was in the Republic of Venice, where he met Cesare Cremonini, and in December, Genoa, where he met Giovanni Battista Baliani.

== Death and legacy ==
Embarking in January 1614 for Spain, Salviati died of an asthma attack in Barcelona on 22 March 1614. He was buried temporarily in the convent of St. Francis until 15 May, when his body was returned to Florence and buried in the family chapel in S. Marco. Niccolò Arrighetti delivered his funeral oration; in Rome Federico Cesi paid him solemn tributes and commissioned his biography from it:Josse De Rycke, who composed only a poem and a cenotaph. A statue of him stands in Padua.

Many years after his friend's death Galileo recreated him as a character in his controversial Dialogue Concerning the Two Chief World Systems (1632) and in the later Discourses and Mathematical Demonstrations Relating to Two New Sciences (1638). In these works the character of Salviati is an expert Copernican mathematician, whom Galileo uses to argue controversial or potentially heretical views, and ultimately win the argument.
