= Phases of Venus =

Variations of lighting of the planet's surface

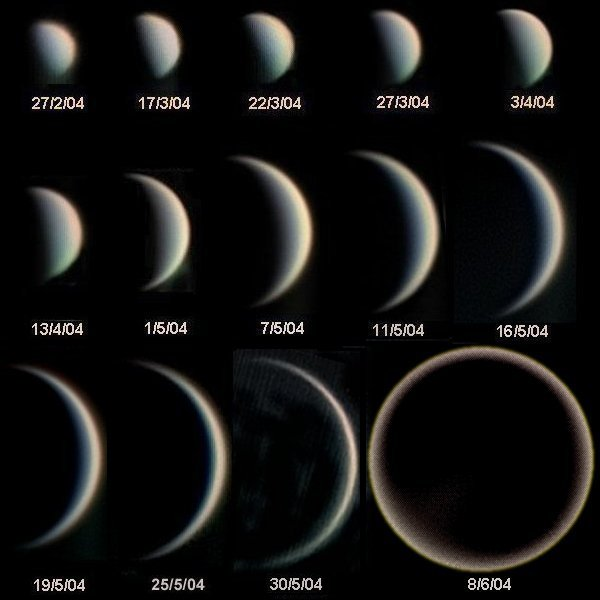
The phases of Venus and evolution of its apparent diameter

The phases of Venus are the variations of lighting seen on the planet's surface, similar to lunar phases. The first recorded observations of them are thought to have been telescopic observations by Galileo Galilei in 1610. Although the extreme crescent phase of Venus has since been observed with the naked eye, there are no indisputable historical pre-telescopic records of it being described or known.

== Observation ==
The orbit of Venus is 224.7 Earth days (7.4 avg. Earth months [30.4 days]). The phases of Venus result from the planet's orbit around the Sun inside the Earth's orbit giving the telescopic observer a sequence of progressive lighting similar in appearance to the Moon's phases. It presents a full image when it is on the opposite side of the Sun. It is a gibbous phase when it approaches or leaves the opposite side of the Sun. It shows a quarter phase when it is at its maximum elongation from the Sun. Venus presents a thin crescent in telescopic views as it comes around to the near side between the Earth and the Sun and presents its new phase when it is between the Earth and the Sun. Since the planet has an atmosphere it can be seen at new in a telescope by the halo of light refracted around the planet. The full cycle from new to full to new again takes 584 days (the time it takes Venus to overtake the Earth in its orbit). Venus (like the Moon) has 4 primary phases of 146 days each.

The planet also changes in apparent size from 9.9 arc seconds at full (superior conjunction) up to a maximum of 68 arc seconds at new (inferior conjunction). Venus reaches its greatest magnitude of about −4.5 when it is an intermediate crescent shape at the point in its orbit, when it is 68 million km away from the Earth, at which point the illuminated part of its disk reaches its greatest angular area as seen from the Earth (a combination of its closeness and the fact that it is 28% illuminated).

Contrary to other planets its apparent magnitude around inferior conjunction does not decrease consistently but rather spikes before dimming further. This is caused by sulfuric acid droplets in Venus' atmosphere reflecting more light at a certain angle and thus phase, an effect similar to a glory on Earth.

== History ==
In 1610 Galileo Galilei observed with his telescope that Venus showed phases, despite remaining near the Sun in Earth's sky (first image). This proved that it orbits the Sun and not Earth, as predicted by Copernicus's heliocentric model, without the need for epicycles as predicted with Kepler's model of elliptical orbits and disproved Ptolemy's geocentric model (second image).

The first observations of the full planetary phases of Venus were by Galileo at the end of 1610 (though not published until 1613 in the Letters on Sunspots). Using a telescope, Galileo was able to observe Venus going through a full set of phases, something prohibited by the Ptolemaic system that assumed Venus to be a perfect celestial body. In the Ptolemaic system, the Sun and Venus circle the earth, with Venus orbiting around a point on the Earth-Sun axis, so that Venus is never on the far side of the sun. One could never expect an alignment Sun-Earth-Venus or Venus-Sun-Earth to occur, so that a full Venus could never be observed. Galileo's observations of the phases of Venus essentially ruled out the Ptolemaic system, and was compatible only with the Copernican system and the Tychonic system and other models such as the Capellan and Riccioli's extended Capellan model.

There is some controversy about Galileo's claim to first observing the phases of Venus: In December of 1610, Galileo received a letter from fellow scientist Benedetto Castelli, asking if the phases of Venus were observable through Galileo's new telescope. Days later, Galileo wrote in a letter to Johannes Kepler saying that he had observed Venus going through phases, but took complete credit for himself. It is unclear, lacking copies of any earlier correspondence, whether Castelli was telling Galileo of it for the first time, or responding to Galileo having previously informed him of it.

Galileo's letter to Kepler was encrypted so that Kepler could not pre-empt Galileo before he had made more exhaustive observations. Galileo wrote a sentence stating that Venus went through phases:

Cynthiae figuras aemulatur mater amorum (The mother of love imitates the shape of Cynthia)

And scrambled the letters into a strange anagram:

Haec immatura a me iam frustra leguntur o.y. (These are now too young to be read by me)

Cynthia was a popular epithet for the Moon, the mother of love of course being Venus. He sent the anagram to Kepler, then a few months later sent the decoded version. This way he had proof of having made the observation, without Kepler being able to publish it earlier. This technique of hiding encoded announcements in letters was not uncommon at the time.

== Naked eye observations ==
The extreme crescent phase of Venus can be seen without a telescope by those with exceptionally acute eyesight, at the limit of human perception. The angular resolution of the naked eye is about 1 minute of arc (60 seconds). The apparent disk of Venus' extreme crescent measures between 60.2 and 66 seconds of arc, depending on the distance from Earth.

Mesopotamian priest-astronomers described Ishtar (Venus) in cuneiform text as having horns which has been interpreted as indicating observation of a crescent. However, other Mesopotamian deities were depicted with horns, so the phrase could have been simply a symbol of divinity.

== See also ==
- Ashen light
- Aspects of Venus
- Transit of Venus
