= Lodovico delle Colombe =

Italian scholar

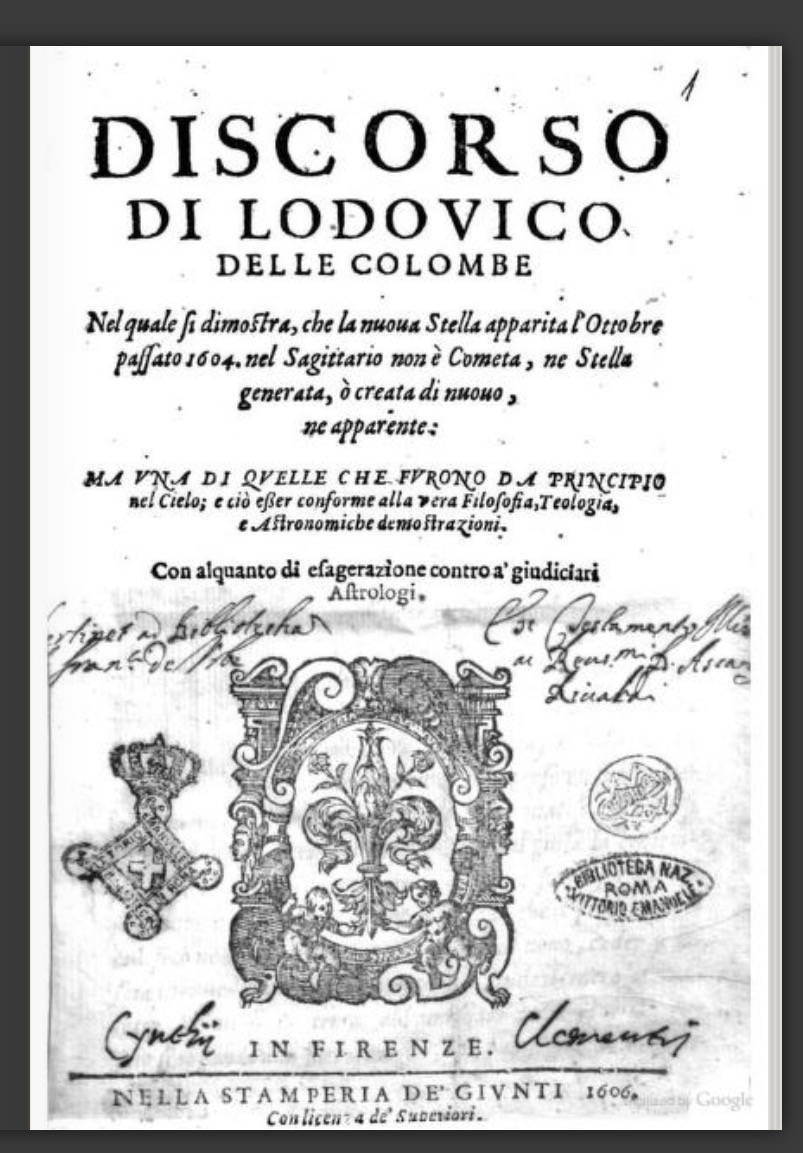
Frontespiece of Lodovico delle Colombe's Discourse on the Supernova of 1604

Lodovico delle Colombe (20 January 1565 – after 1623) was an Italian Aristotelian scholar, famous for his debates with Galileo Galilei in a series of controversies in physics and astronomy.

== Early life ==
Delle Colombe was born in Florence in the second half of the 16th century. A date of January 20, 1565 has been suggested, but the source for this is unknown. Likewise nothing is known of his family, except that he was of noble origin, or of his education. He became a member of the Accademia Fiorentina when Francesco Nori was its consul and was also a member of the Consiglio dei Dugento, the advisory body to the Grand Duchy of Tuscany. He was said to be tall and very thin with a long white beard, a little bald head and sunken eyes. He wore a fleece jacket and a large collar. Because of his appearance and his lonely and melancholy character he was nicknamed 'the Superintendent of Limbo' by the satirical poet Francesco Ruspoli. One of his brothers, Raffaello delle Colombe (1557–1627), was the Dominican Prior of Santa Maria Novella, who denounced Galileo from his pulpit.

== Dispute over the 1604 supernova ==
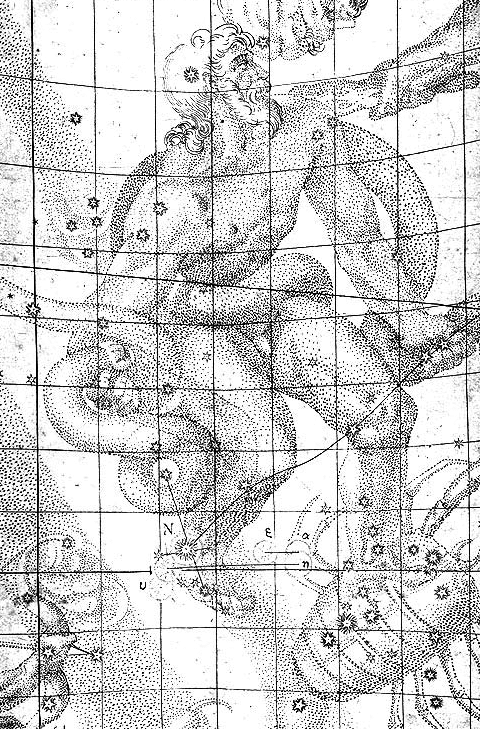
Kepler's illustration of the 1604 supernova in the foot of Ophiuchus (the serpent-bearer)

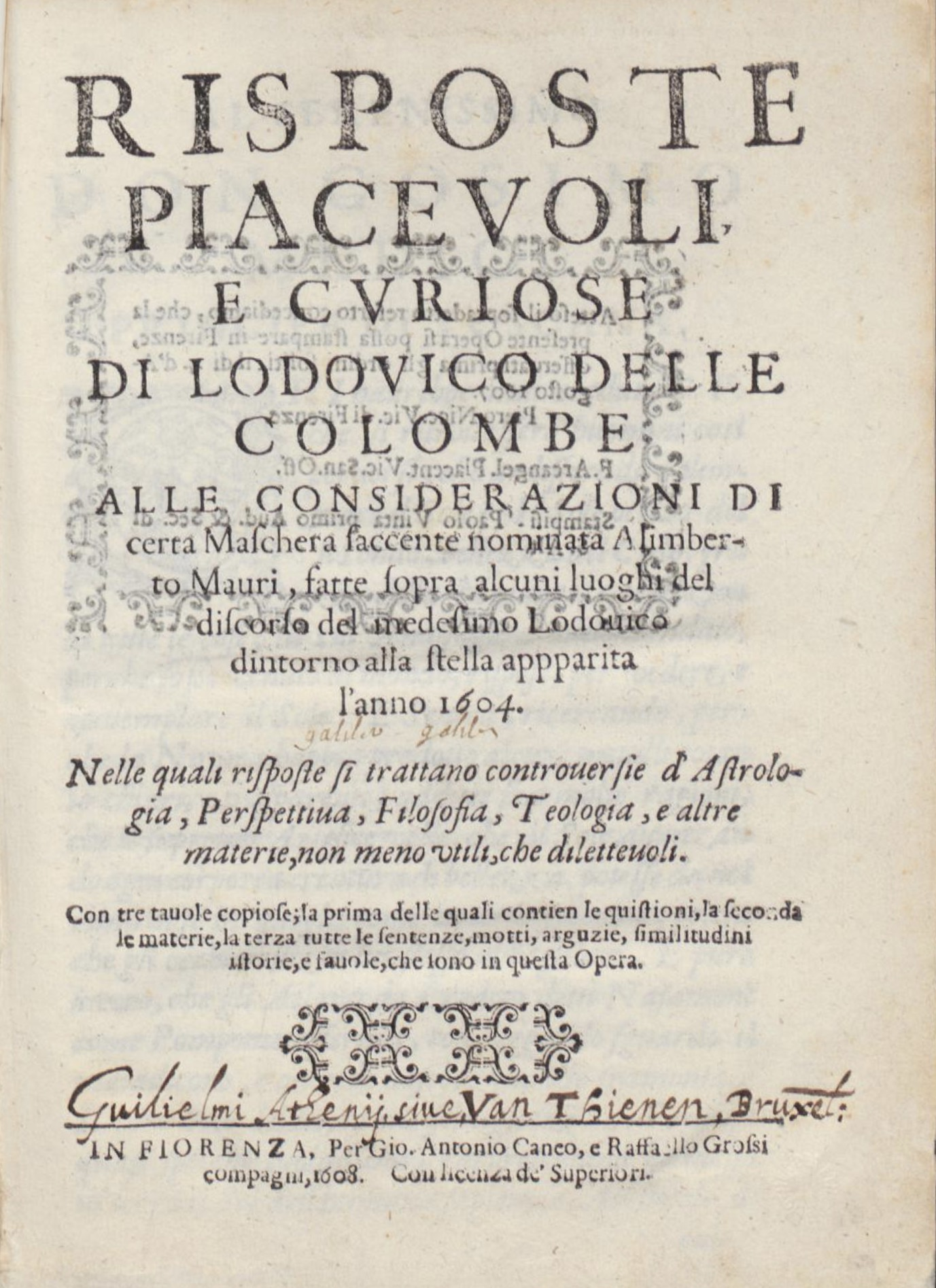
Frontespiece of 'Risposte Piacevole e Curiose di Lodovico delle Colombe alle Considerazioni di certa maschera saccente, nominata A. Mauri'

In October 1604, a new star was seen. By night, it was the brightest star in the sky, and it was visible during the day for more than three weeks, before eventually dimming. In 1606, Delle Colombe published his discourse on the phenomenon, (Note: 1606 – Discourse of Lodovico delle Colombe in which he shows that the Star Newly Appeared in October 1604 is neither a Comet nor a New Star) dedicated to Alessandro Marzi Medici, the Archbishop of Florence. In his work delle Colombe argued that the star was not new, but permanent, though only occasionally visible. This argument echoed that of Johannes van Heeck in supporting the generally accepted model of the universe, known as the Aristotelian model or the Ptolemaic system. This held that the stars were fixed in their positions and unchanging; thus if an unusual event took place among the stars, this suggested that they could not be fixed in a 'firmament'. By arguing that the star was permanent rather than new, Delle Colombe defended the Aristotelian view, while suggesting reasons for why it had not previously been observed. In support of these arguments, delle Colombe drew not only on astronomical observations but on the authority of Aristotle, and of many other Peripatetic thinkers, including the Conimbricenses, Gasparo Contarini, and Julius Caesar Scaliger.

Galileo, then a professor at the University of Padua, lectured on the supernova, proposing different possible ways it could have been produced. Galileo was cautious in his views, but did regard the phenomenon as new, and not as a permanent star. A few months after delle Colombe's book appeared, a response to his ideas was published under the title of Considerations of Alimberto Mauri on Some Passages in the Discourse of Lodovico delle Colombe. (Note: 1606 – Considerations of Alimberto Mauri on Some Passages in the Discourse of Lodovico delle Colombe) Alimberto Mauri was a pseudonym and delle Colombe (like most scholars since) believed that the author was Galileo. The book ridiculed many of delle Colombe's views about the star, and belittled him as 'nostro colombo' ('our pigeon'). It asserted that astronomy had no need of Aristotelian philosophy, and should focus on observation and mathematics. The approach of first seeing something in the sky and then developing an elaborate explanation to make that observation fit with Aristotelian cosmology was directly challenged. Delle Colombe himself then responded to 'Mauri' by publishing Risposte piacevoli e curiose (Pleasant and curious replies) in 1608. (Note: 1608 – Pleasant and Curious Responses of Lodovico delle Colombe) In this text delle Colombe not only attacked the ideas of Copernicus, but associated them with Galileo by name.

== Dispute over the motion of the Earth ==
The disputes between delle Colombe and Galileo grew more protracted when Galileo first published new findings which challenged Artistotelian cosmology, and then moved from Padua to Florence. In 1609 Galileo had built a telescope, through which he had observed the moons of Jupiter as well as the mountains and craters on the Moon. In March 1610 he published his findings in Siderius Nuncius (Note: 1610 – Galileo's Siderius Nuncius) (The Starry Messenger), (Note: 1610 – Galileo's Starry Messenger) which he dedicated to Cosimo II de' Medici, Grand Duke of Tuscany, naming the moons of Jupiter the 'Medician stars'. He then negotiated with the Grand Duke to secure for himself the position of Philosopher and Chief Mathematician at the court in Florence.

Galileo barely mentioned the motion of the Earth in Siderius Nuncius, as its focus was on his new discoveries. Nevertheless, in his discussion of earthshine he implied that the Earth changes its position rather than remaining static, and then added:

' Let these few remarks suffice us here concerning this matter, which will be more fully treated in our System of the World. In that book, by a multitude of arguments and experiences, the solar reflection from the earth will be shown to be quite real-against those who argue that the earth must be excluded from the dancing whirl of stars for the specific reason that it is devoid of motion and of light. We shall prove the earth to be a wandering body surpassing the moon in splendor, and not the sink of all dull refuse of the universe; this we shall support by an infinitude of arguments drawn from nature '

Galileo may have been trying to quietly introduce his more speculative ideas about the universe among the empirical observations made with his telescope, but these few sentences gave delle Colombe sufficient grounds to attack him at an apparent weak point, in an attempt to force him to defend the motion of the Earth specifically. In 1610, delle Colombe contested Galileo's views – though he did not mention Galileo by name – in his leaflet Contro il Moto della Terra (Against the Motion of the Earth). (Note: 1610 – Delle Colombe's Against the Motion of the Earth) It was not printed, but circulated in manuscript form, mostly in Florence.

The text introduced a number of objections to the idea of the Earth's motion, which appealed to common sense. He began by pointing out that mathematics was not an adequate tool for describing nature, since it dealt only with abstractions and might therefore predict phenomena which did not actually occur. Then he proceeded to outline some thought experiments. If a cannon was fired due east, the ball moved in the direction of the Earth's rotation; if fired to the west, the ball moved against the Earth's rotation. Since the ball lands the same distance from the cannon in either case, the Earth cannot be moving. Likewise if a crossbow were shot directly upwards, the bolt would land some way from the archer rather than at his feet, if the Earth moved.

The final section of this work marked a shift in the arguments put forward by delle Colombe – instead of simply defending Aristotle or challenging Galileo for empirical proofs, he introduced a series of scriptural and theological objections to his claims. (Galileo appears to have used delle Colombe's arguments as the basis for those of the character Simplicio in his 1632 work Dialogue Concerning the Two Chief World Systems.) Delle Colombe was the first writer to use biblical text against Galileo.

Galileo decided not to respond to delle Colombe's invitation to argue his case about literal and other readings of holy text, saying that as 'Contra il Moto della Terra' had only been circulated in manuscript and not published, there was no reason for him to reply.

== Dispute over the surface of the Moon ==
While the main arguments in 'Contro il Moto della Terra' are concerned with the Earth's motion, delle Colombe also responded to Galileo's claim that the surface of the Moon was rough and mountainous. It was a basic tenet of Aristotelian cosmology that the planets were all perfect spheres. He therefore speculated that the apparent mountains Galileo had seen were not mountains at all, but merely dense 'ripples' of matter with a pure and transparent material filling the gaps between them to make a perfect sphere. Once again, he was devising speculative answers to reconcile Aristotelian ideas with empirical observations.

In 1611 delle Colombe pursued this matter in a letter to Christopher Clavius hoping to enlist his support, but Clavius did not reply. Galileo soon obtained a copy of delle Colombe's letter to Clavius, and responded by writing to a friend, confirming his opinion about the Moon's surface, emphasising delle Colombe's incompetence in astronomy, and ridiculing him as pippione (pigeon). However, as delle Colombe's views were not published, Galileo did not publicly respond either. Indeed, Galileo, who privately ridiculed delle Colombe mercilessly, never gave him the satisfaction of a formal public response to his challenges. Although delle Colombe enjoyed the support of Archbishop Alessandro Marzi Medici and of Don Giovanni de' Medici, his patron was never the Archduke himself or any other very senior figure, and it may be that Galileo simply refused to engage directly with him for this reason.

== Dispute over floating bodies ==
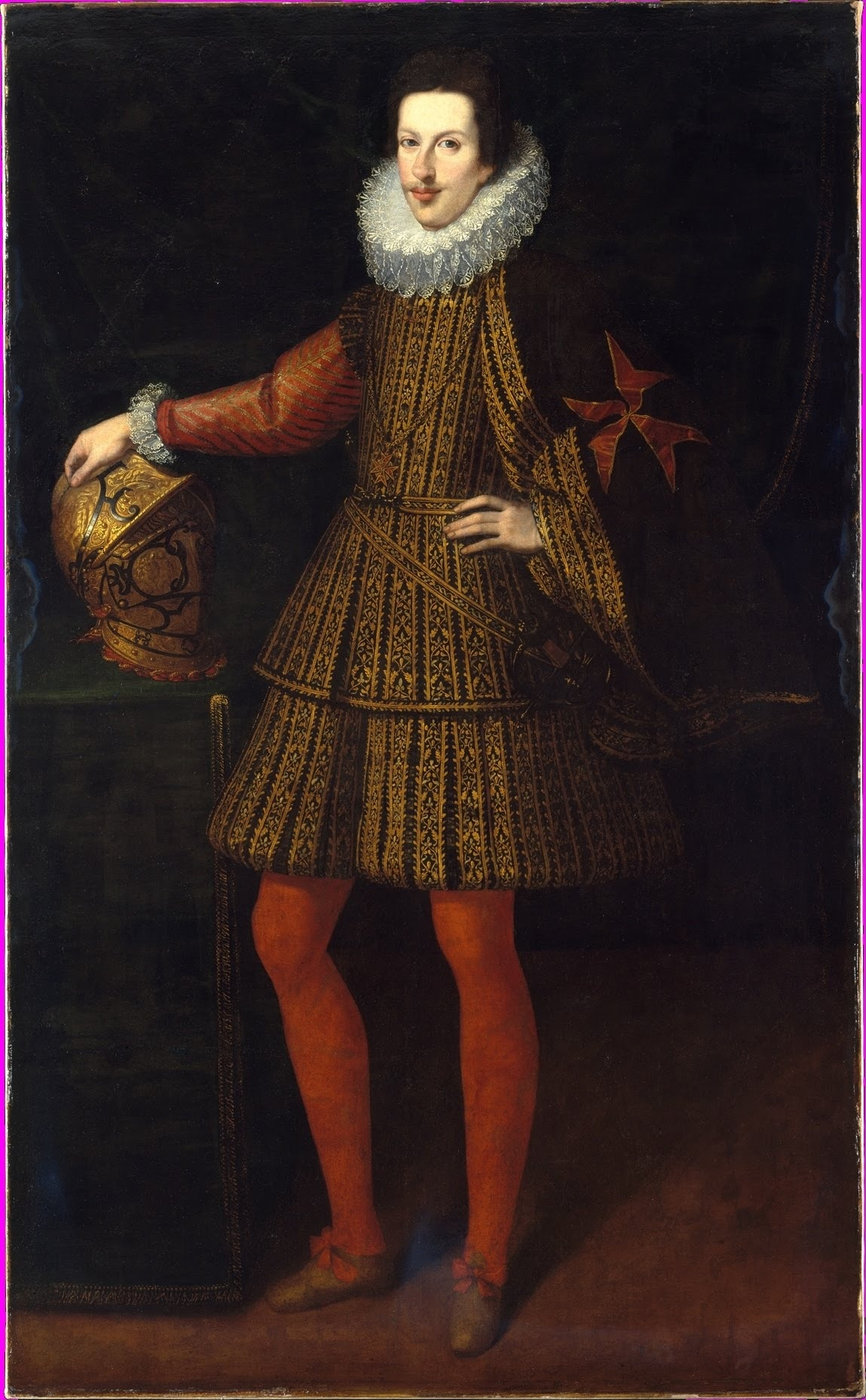
Cosimo II, Grand Duke of Tuscany

In July 1611 a debate about the nature of cold was held at the house of Galileo's friend Filippo Salviati, with two Aristotelians, it:Vincenzo di Grazia and Giorgio Coresio. The Aristotelians held that ice was condensed water, which floated because of its flat, thin shape; Galileo, whose view was informed by Archimedes, maintained that ice was rarified water, which floated because it was less dense than the water supporting it. As the discussion developed, Galileo took the position that all bodies denser than water sink, while all lighter than water float, regardless of their shape. Three days after this first encounter, di Grazia visited Galileo, and told him that a friend had volunteered to disprove Galileo's position by demonstration. This was delle Colombe. Galileo signed an agreement setting out the terms of the demonstrations both parties were to prepare, and a date was set for them to meet and present their cases in mid-August at the house of Canon Francesco Nori.

In the days before this proposed meeting, delle Colombe took his demonstration to the streets and public places of Florence to show how easily he could prove Galileo wrong. As he showed, a thin strip of ebony floated on water, while a sphere of the same material sank. This, he maintained, showed that shape, not density, determined whether an object would float. However delle Colombe never actually appeared on the agreed day for the planned demonstrations, suggesting that he perhaps understood that his demonstration relied on the particular effects of the surface tension of water rather than on the shapes of his pieces of ebony. Galileo then proposed that they meet on a new date at Salviati's house, and that on this occasion the objects to be placed on the water should all be thoroughly wetted first (which would have removed the surface tension effect). However, when delle Colombe arrived on the appointed day he found that Galileo was unwilling to proceed as they had agreed. Apparently the Grand Duke had rebuked him for involving himself in a vulgar public spectacle, and Galileo therefore said that he would commit his proofs to writing rather than undertake public demonstrations. After this, delle Colombe seems not to have had any further direct role in public debate on this topic. In September Galileo circulated a manuscript outlining his views, but when Cosimo II staged a public debate on the question of floating bodies, it was Flaminio Papazzoni rather than delle Colombe who argued, and lost, against Galileo.

In 1612 Galileo formally set out his views on this topic in his Discourse on Floating Bodies (Note: 1612 – Galileo's Discourse on Floating Bodies) and Delle Colombe swiftly replied with Discorso Apologetico (Note: 1612 – Delle Colombe's Discorso Apologetico di Lodovico delle Colombe d'Intorno al Discorso di Galileo Galilei) Galileo did not reply immediately, and indeed when his reply was published, it was over the name of his friend Benedetto Castelli. Galileo may have felt no useful purpose was served by involving himself directly in this debate, and he may simply not have had the time to respond in detail to all the errors in delle Colombe's book. Castelli was able to produce a thoroughly argued refutation of delle Colombe's points, clearly with help and input from Galileo. Castelli's Risposta alle Opposizioni del S. Lodovico delle Colombe (Note: 1615 – Benedetto Castelli's Risposta alle Opposizioni del S. Lodovico delle Colombe) was published in 1615, marking the end of this particular dispute.

== The Pigeon League and the Roman Inquisition ==
While delle Colombe was almost alone in arguing publicly against Galileo, his Aristotelian views were supported by a group of Florentine scholars and churchmen. The painter Lodovico Cigoli, a close friend of Galileo, coined the nickname 'Lega del Pippione' ('The Pigeon League') for this group, after Galileo had referred disparagingly to delle Colombe as 'pippione' ('pigeon'). As well as being a play on delle Colombe's surname (of the Doves), 'pippione' carried the connotation of 'bird-brained' or 'easily duped'. Included among the members of the Pigeon League was Delle Colombe's brother Rafaello, a leading Dominican, close to Marzi Medici, the archbishop of Florence, who frequently sermonised against Copernican ideas in general and Galileo in particular. Two others were also Dominicans, Tommaso Caccini and Niccolò Lorini.

In December 1611, soon after the dispute over floating bodies, Cigoli wrote to Galileo warning him that a group of his enemies were meeting regularly in the house of the Archbishop, "in a mad quest for any means by which they can damage you." They had apparently already tried to persuade someone to attack him from the pulpit. The attack, when it came, was launched by Caccini. He had obtained a copy of Galileo's letter to Benedetto Castelli, which explained how the Copernican system could be reconciled with the book of Joshua. On 20 December 1614, he preached a sermon in Santa Maria Novella in Florence, attacking Galileo and quoting the Acts of the Apostles,"Viri galilaei, quid statis adspicientes in caelum?" ("Men of Galilee, why do you stand gazing into heaven?").

Six weeks later, on 7 February 1615, Lorini sent a copy of Galileo's Letter to Castelli to the Roman Inquisition with a written complaint. On 20 March 1615 Caccini followed this up with a second deposition to the Inquisition, accusing him of heresy. The Inquisition thereupon opened an investigation into Galileo. What direct role delle Colombe may have played in these developments is not known.

== Later life ==
Delle Colombe is referred to as a living person in Castelli's 1615 book. After this date there are no known works by him and no literary or scientific references to him. In 1623, Lodovico delle Colombe and his brother Corso were elected to the Consiglio dei Dugento. Nothing is known of him after this date.
