= Giorgio Coresio =

Greek scholar

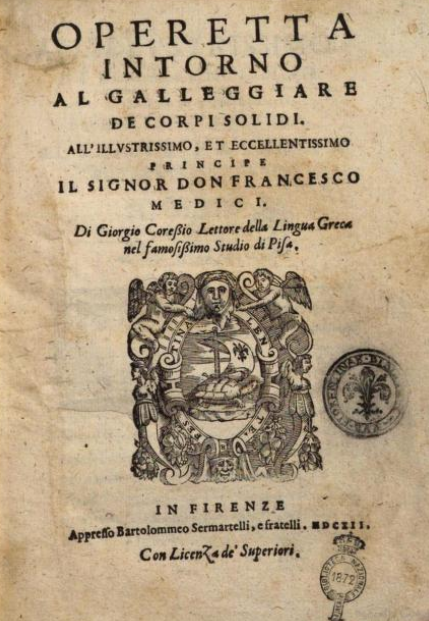
Frontispiece of Coresio's Operetta intorno al Galleggiare de Corpi Solidi, arguing against Galileo's views

Giorgio Coresio (1570-1659?) from the Greek (then Ottoman) island of Chios was a lecturer in Greek at the University of Pisa from 1609-1615. He was obliged to resign his chair either because it was discovered that he secretly professed the Greek Orthodox faith, or because of his mental illness - he is said to have had daily visions of saints.

Coresio was one of the group described scornfully by Galileo as the 'Pigeon League' of Aristotelian philosophers, associated with Lodovico delle Colombe. Galileo argued for an approach which he described as 'pluming the wings [i.e. of natural philosophy] with the feathers of mathematics, without which it is impossible to rise even an arm's measure above the earth'. Traditional scholars objected to the mixing of mathematics with the established forms of scholarly speculation and argument. Coresio described this approach as one which was 'full of radical change, and represented all things in the universe under different faces'.

== Dispute about floating bodies ==
Coresio is most noted for his dispute with Galileo over the question of how solid bodies float in water. In the summer of 1611, at the house of Filippo Salviati, a scholarly disagreement began about the nature of cold. Coresio took part in this discussion, together with Vincenzo di Grazia, maintaining the traditional Aristotelian view that ice was denser than water, only floating because of its shape. Galileo, in contrast, argued that ice floated precisely because it was less dense than water.

Coresio's contribution to this dispute was his 1612 work Operetta intorno al Galleggiare de Corpi Solidi (Short Essay on the Floating of Solid Bodies). Galileo, working together with Benedetto Castelli, put together a reply under the heading of Errori più manifesti commessi da Messer Giorgio Coresio (The most obvious errors committed by Mr. Giorgio Coresio). This work was never published however as by 1613 when it was ready, Galileo's attention had been diverted to defending himself against many other hostile essays published by associates of delle Colombe. By 1614, signs of Coresio's mental health problems had become clear, and this may be another reason why Galileo never published his response.

== Dispute about falling bodies ==
Another extended dispute involving Galileo and Coresio was over falling bodies - specifically whether heavier bodies fell faster than lighter ones (as Aristotle claimed) or whether they fell at the same rate (as Galileo maintained). It was a common belief in the past that Galileo had conducted an experiment by dropping objects of different weights from the Leaning Tower of Pisa to prove his point, but he never claimed to have done so and it is now considered doubtful that he did. On the other hand Coresio did claim to have done this experiment himself, and to have thereby proved Aristotle's view.

== Other ==
The encyclical of Benedict XIV Ex Quo (1756) announced an authorised version of Greek prayers for adherents to the Melkite Greek Catholic Church. It cited Giorgio Coresio as one of the ' outstanding scholars and experts in Greek affairs' who were consulted when an earlier edition of the prayers (Euchologion) was produced.
