= Letters on Sunspots =

1613 pamphlet by Galileo Galilei

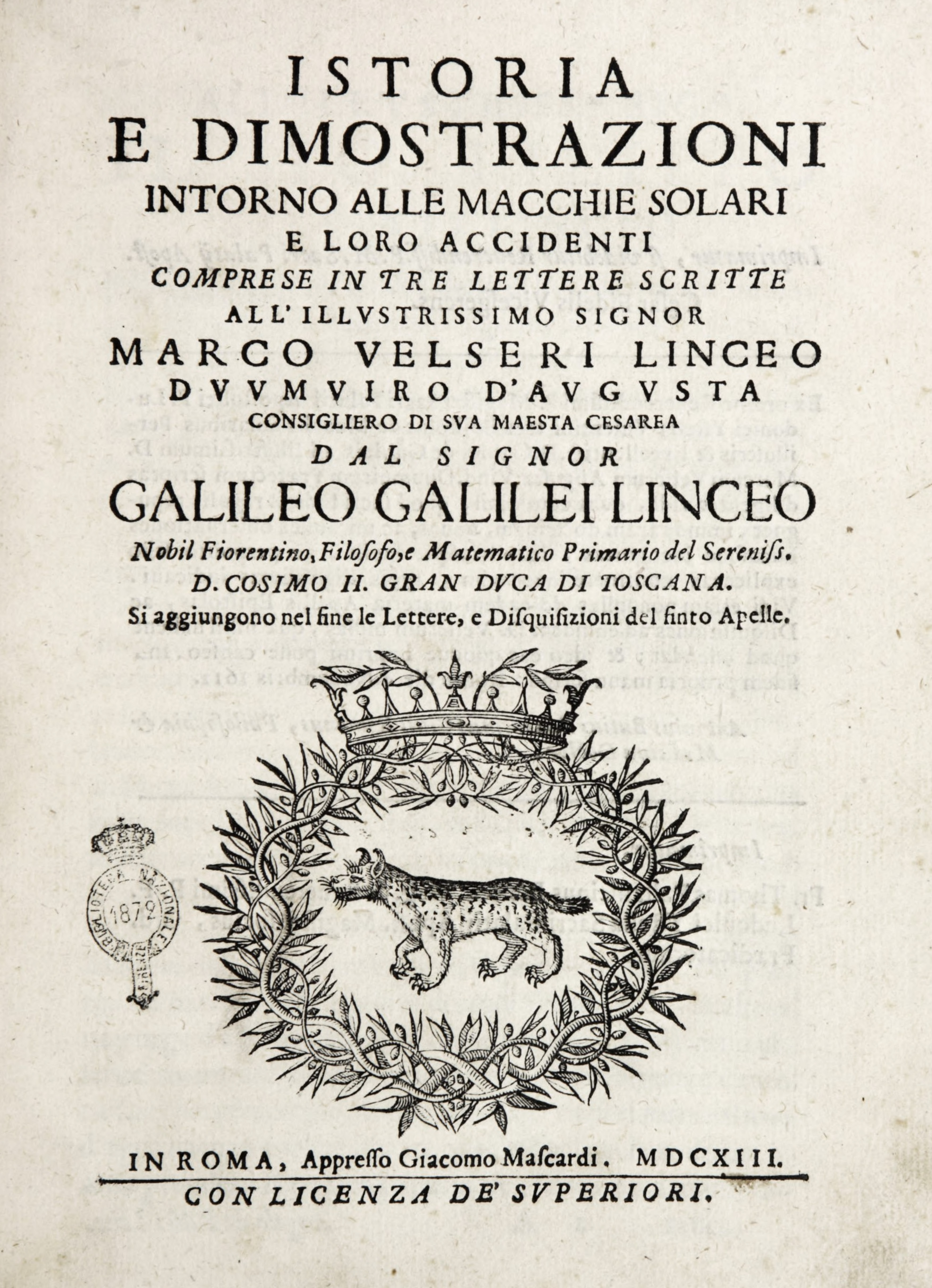
Frontispiece of Letters on Sunspots

Letters on Sunspots (Istoria e Dimostrazioni intorno alle Macchie Solari) was a pamphlet written by Galileo Galilei in 1612 and published in Rome by the Accademia dei Lincei in 1613. In it, Galileo outlined his recent observation of dark spots on the face of the Sun. His claims were significant in undermining the traditional Aristotelian view that the Sun was both unflawed and unmoving. The Letters on Sunspots was a continuation of Sidereus Nuncius, Galileo's first work where he publicly declared that he believed that the Copernican system was correct.

== Previous observations of sunspots ==
Galileo was not the first person to observe sunspots. The earliest apparent reference to them appears in the I Ching of ancient China, while the earliest recorded observation is also Chinese, dating to 364 BC. Around the same time, the first European mention of sunspots is found, by Theophrastus. There were reports from Islamic and European astronomers of sunspots in the early ninth century; those occurring in 1129 were recorded by both Averroes and John of Worcester, whose drawings of the phenomenon are the earliest surviving today. Johannes Kepler observed a sunspot in 1607 but, like some earlier observers, believed he was watching the transit of Mercury. The sunspot activity of December 1610 was the first to be observed using the newly invented telescope, by Thomas Harriot, who sketched what he saw but did not publish it. In 1611 Johannes Fabricius saw them, and published a pamphlet entitled De Maculis in Sole Observatis, which Galileo was not aware of before he wrote the Letters on Sunspots.

== Critical dialogue with Scheiner ==
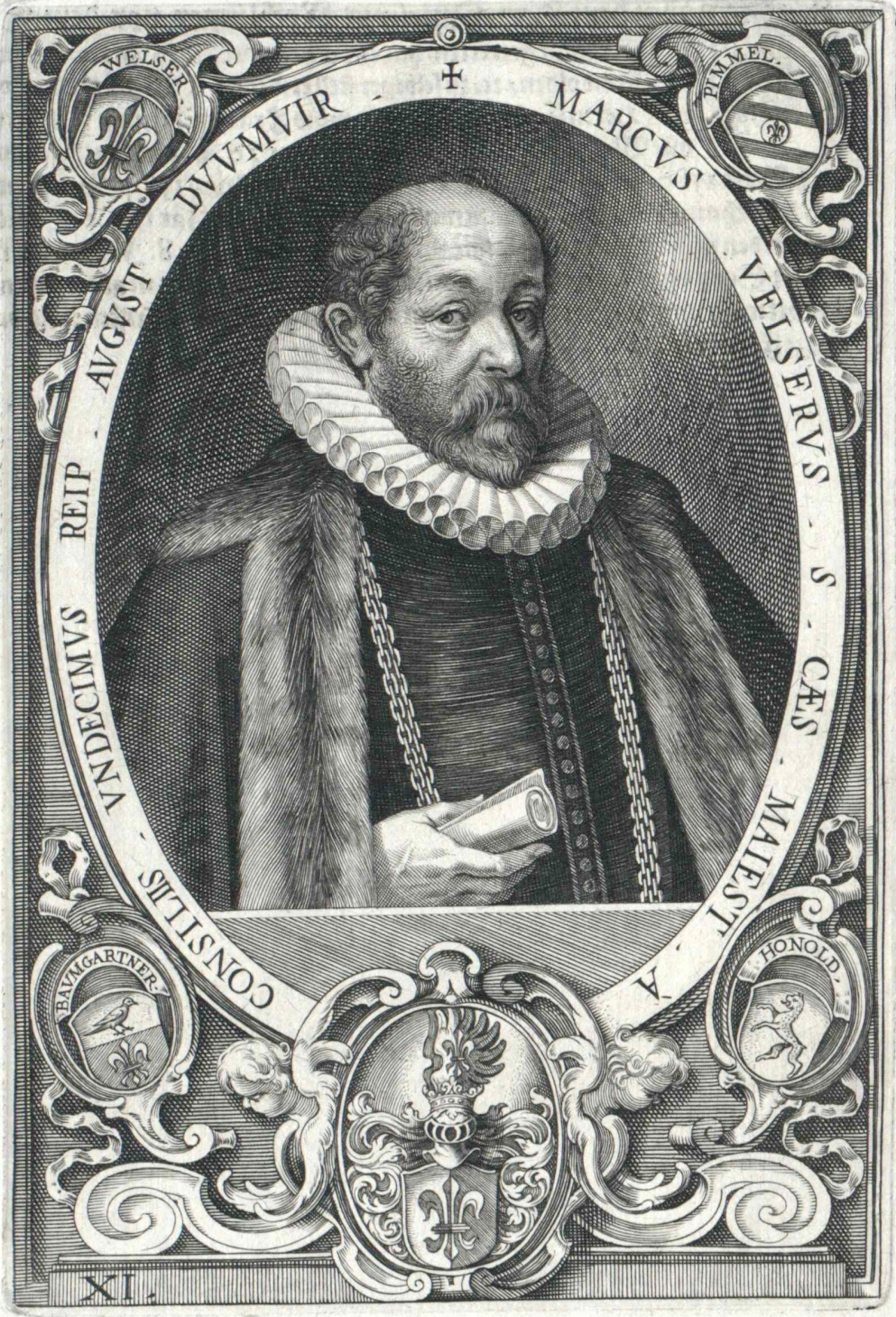
Mark Welser

When Jesuit Christoph Scheiner first observed sunspots in March 1611, he ignored them until he saw them again in October. Then, under the pseudonym Apelles latens post tabulam (Apelles hiding behind the painting), he presented his description and conclusions about them in three letters to the Augsburg banker and scholar Mark Welser. Scheiner wanted to remain anonymous to avoid involving the Jesuit order and the church generally in an area of controversy. Welser published them on his own presses, sent copies to astronomers around Europe, and invited them to reply. It was Welser's invitation which prompted Galileo to reply with two letters, arguing that the sunspots were not satellites, as Scheiner ('Apelles') maintained, but were features either on the Sun's surface or just above it.

In the meantime, Scheiner sent Welser two further letters on the subject, and after he had read Galileo's first letter, he responded with a sixth of his own. These later letters were different in tone from the first three, as they hinted that Galileo was claiming credit for having discovered the phases of Venus, when in fact proper credit was due to others. They also implied that Galileo had copied Scheiner's helioscope in order to do his research.

Having published Scheiner's first three letters under the title Tres Epistolae de Maculis Solaribus ("Three Letters on Solar Spots"), Welser now published his second three, also in 1612, as De Maculis Solaribus et Stellis circa Iovis Errantibus Accuratior Disquisition ("A More Accurate Disquisition Concerning Solar Spots and Stars Wandering around Jupiter"). Having read these second three letters, Galileo replied with a third of his own, much sharper and more polemical in tone than his earlier ones. Welser declined to publish Galileo's letters, perhaps because of the sarcastic tone they took towards Apelles, although the reason he gave Galileo was the exorbitant cost of producing all the illustrations Galileo wanted.

== Censorship by the Inquisition ==
Publishing the Letters on Sunspots was a major financial and intellectual venture for the Accademia dei Lincei, and it was only the fourth title it had decided to issue. Federico Cesi paid for the publication himself, and wanted to strike a careful balance between introducing extraordinary new ideas and avoiding causing offence to people who might find those views problematic. This was consistent with the Accademia's project of acting as a centre for the dissemination of radical new scientific ideas, issued with the agreement of the Church authorities. Cesi tried to persuade Galileo to avoid an aggressive or polemical tone in his letters, to avoid antagonising the Jesuits (Scheiner's identity behind the pseudonym 'Apelles' was already suspected), but having read Scheiner's apparent accusations of bad faith in his later letters, Galileo did not heed his advice. Indeed, the published version of his Letters on Sunspots contained a preface by Angelo de Filiis which uncompromisingly asserted Galileo's primacy in discovering sunspots. The text was presented for censorship to the Roman Inquisition in order to obtain permission to print. The censors assigned were Cesare Fidelis, Luigi Ystella, Tommaso Pallavicini and Antonio Bucci.

Ensuring the book was ready to print was a collaborative process involving the censors, Galileo, Cesi and others in working on the text until it was acceptable to the Inquisition, and the censors were well acquainted with the leading figures of the Accademia. Antonio Bucci, for example, was a physician who had previously been involved in reviewing work by Giambattista della Porta, also published by Cesi. In the case of Letters on Sunspots his critical support appears to have been helpful in ensuring that publication was not prevented by influential Dominicans of the Sacred Palace. Indeed, in his comments Bucci praised Galileo's work, with which he was already familiar, as he had been invited to take part in the Accademia's discussions about it before the manuscript was presented for censorship.

The censors insisted that Galileo remove from his text any reference to scripture or claims for divine guidance. Thus the pamphlet was to have opened with a quotation from Matthew 11:12 'The kingdom of heaven suffers violence, and men of violence take it by force.' The censors objected that this could be understood to mean that astronomers wanted to overpower theology. It was therefore amended to 'Already the minds of men assail the heavens, and the more valiant conquer them.' Further on in the text Galileo's claim that 'divine goodness' had led him to advocate the system of Copernicus was struck out, and replaced with 'favourable winds'. Galileo's text referred to the idea that the heavens were immutable as 'erroneous and repugnant to the indubitable truth of Scripture.' Like all other mentions of Scripture, the censors insisted that this too was removed. Galileo wanted to claim divine inspiration for his findings and show how they accorded with Holy Writ; the censors wanted to keep unusual new ideas at a safe distance from core tenets of the faith. With these amendments Galileo was authorised to take his book to print.

Half of the printed edition of 1400 copies of Letters on Sunspots contained both the Apelles Letters and Scheiner's illustrations as well as Galileo's replies. The other half contained Galileo's work only. The total cost of the book was 258.70 scudi, of which 44 scudi was the cost of the illustrations and tables and 6 scudi was the cost of engraving the frontespiece.

== Galileo's First Letter - 4 May 1612 ==
Galileo describes how he has observed sunspots for eighteen months. His key conclusions are that sunspots were real and not merely optical illusions; and that they were not static, but moved. The sunspots had a single motion, moving across the Sun in a uniform fashion. Galileo argued that the Sun was a perfect sphere and that it moves by itself on its own center. The Sun carries these spots until they disappear from view at its rim in about one lunar month.

Scheiner's view that the spots were satellites prompts Galileo to comment on the phases of Venus and how they supported a heliocentric view. He develops his argument to show that sunspots were not permanent and did not have a regular pattern of movement as they would if they were heavenly bodies – they were nothing like the moons of Jupiter that he had himself discovered and described in Siderius Nuncius. 'The sun, turning on its axis, carries them around without necessarily showing us the same spots, or in the same order, or having the same shape.' He noted the parallels between sunspots and clouds over the Earth, but did not assert that they were made of the same material. His comment on 'Apelles' (the pseudonym of Scheiner) was:

'It seems to me therefore that Apelles has a free, and not a servile mind; he is well able to grasp true teaching; and now, prompted by the strength of so many new ideas, he is beginning to listen and to assent to true and sound philosophy, especially as regards the arrangement of the universe. But he is not yet able to detach himself completely from the fantasies he absorbed in the past, to which his intellect sometimes returns and lends assent by force of long-established habit.'

Much of Galileo's first letter is devoted to demonstrating weaknesses in Scheiner's arguments – inconsistencies, false analogies, and unlikely conclusions from the observations he had made.

=== Responding to points in Apelles' first letter ===
- Apelles says the sunspots move from east to west, when he should have said they moved from west to east. This is not in fact a disagreement about the direction of the spots, but a reminder of the conventions used by astronomers to describe them. From the point of view of the Earth, the sunspots move to move from east to west, but astronomers describe celestial movement from the 'highest' (i.e. furthest away from the Earth) point of their cycles.
- Apelles has not conclusively demonstrated that the spots cannot be on the surface of the Sun, simply by asserting that because it is bright, it cannot have dark parts.
- Apelles is wrong to say that sunspots are much darker than dark spots on the Moon; the spots are in fact not as dark as the area immediately around the Sun which is most strongly illuminated by it, and this area is itself so bright that the Moon would be invisible if we tried to observe it in that position.

=== Responding to points in Apelles' second letter ===
- Apelles discusses the transit of Venus but is wrong about the size of the planet relative to the Sun; it is so much smaller than Apelles suggests that it may not even be possible for observers to see it making its transit, meaning that the lack of a definite sighting of the transit does not necessarily prove anything. (Scheiner had argued that since a transit of Venus was predicted but not seen, this must mean that Venus had passed behind the Sun, thereby lending support to Tycho Brahe's view that Venus, like all planets apart from the Moon, orbited around the Sun).

=== Responding to points in Apelles' third letter ===
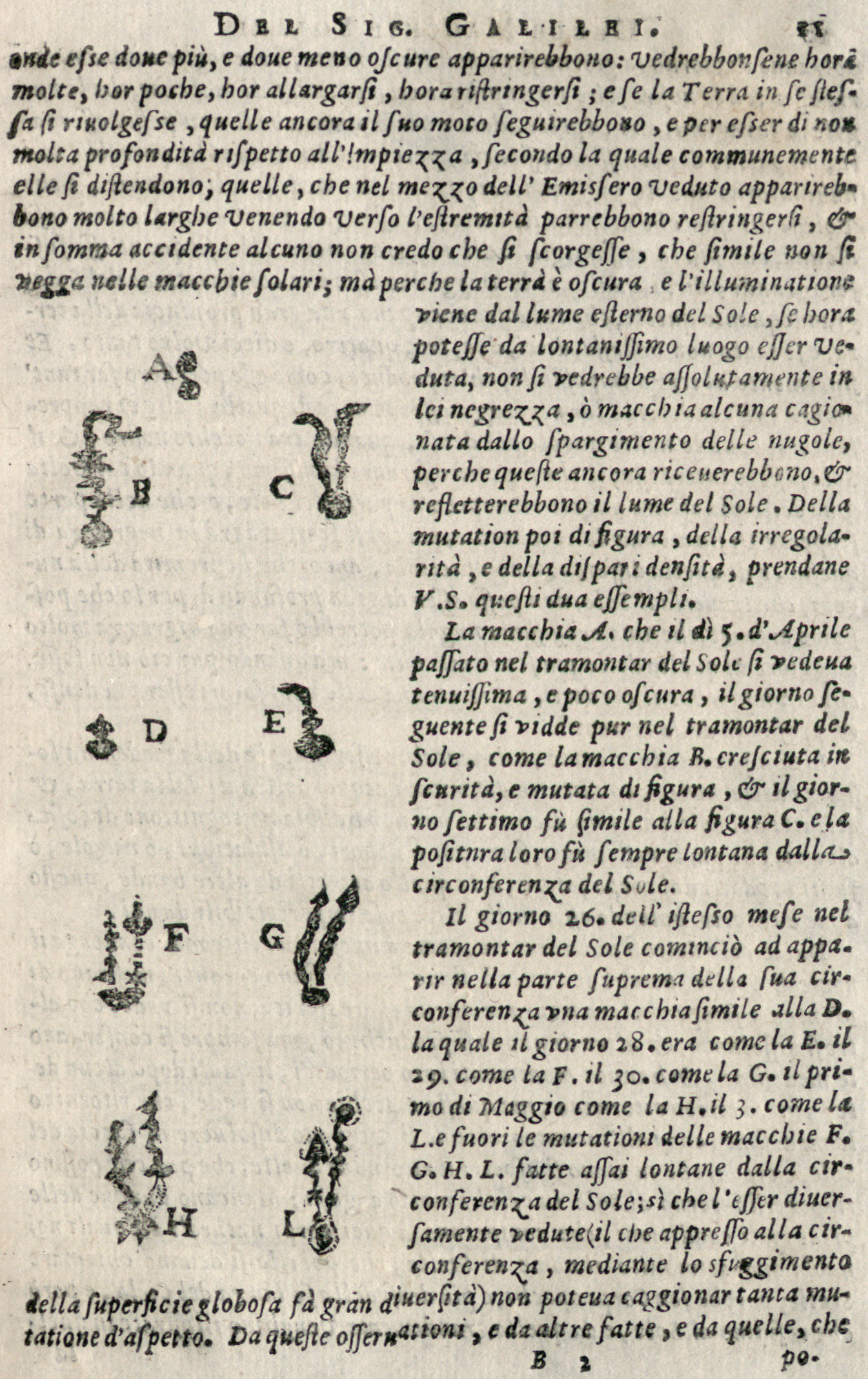
The changing shape of sunspots: A-C are one spot; D-L are another

- Apelles reports that sunspots took around fifteen days to pass across the face of the Sun, and that he never saw the same spots re-emerge on the eastern limb of the Sun fifteen days after they disappeared on the western limb. He concludes that they could not therefore be features carried around the Sun on its surface by a regular rotation. Galileo responds that this would be the case if Apelles had shown that the spots were solid bodies, whereas it is obvious to observers that they are changing shape as they move around the Sun. He therefore says that Apelles has not proved that they could not be on the surface of the Sun.
- Apelles arguments are inconsistent. When considering his failure to observe a transit of Venus, he concludes that Venus must be behind the Sun (which was possible in Tycho Brahe's model of the universe but impossible in Ptolemy's); however when discussing parallax, in a later part of his argument, he claims that Venus only displays a small parallax (required in Ptolemy's system but impossible in Brahe's).
- Apelles argues that the spots are not in any of the 'orbs' of the Moon, Venus or Mercury; but according to Galileo these 'orbs', like deferents and epicycles, were only theoretical devices of 'pure astronomers' and not actual physical entities. 'Philosophical astronomers' have no interest in such concepts but are concerned with trying to understand how the universe actually works. Apelles does not even argue consistently on the basis of his assumptions that these orbs and other suppositional devices actually exist, for he says first that if the spots were phenomena in the 'orbs' of the Moon, Venus or Mercury (which only appear to us to be on the face of the Sun) then they would have to move with motion of those planets. However having concluded that the spots are in the 'orb' of the Sun, he maintains that they do not move with the motion of the Sun, but independently of it.
- Galileo then offers a different explanation to the one Apelles had suggested for the fact that as the sunspots approach the limb of the Sun in their rotation, they grow thinner. Apelles had included a diagram in his third letter to demonstrate how he believed this could be explained in terms of the spots being small moons, which went through phases. Galileo maintained that this was doubtful. As the dark area of sunspots approach the limb of the Sun, it appears from observation that the area of darkness reduces from the side facing away from the Sun – i.e. that the spots are actually getting thinner. If they were moons, the area of darkness would diminish from the side facing the centre of the Sun.
- Galileo points out inconsistencies in the arguments by Apelles which, in one place, would mean the spots had to be very close to the Sun, and, in another part, that they must be far away from it. The differences in speed between spots moving near the Sun's equator and those further away from it argue for their being on the surface, as the larger the notional 'orb' outside the Sun the spots might be carried on, the less visible this difference in speed would be.
- Galileo considers the possible 'essence' or substance of the sunspots, and says he does not believe there is yet any way of knowing it. He shows however that of all the things we observe on Earth, it is clouds that share the most characteristics with sunspots. Whatever they may be made of, they are certainly not 'stars' as Apelles suggests, since, as he himself shows, they cannot be observed making regular orbits of the Sun.

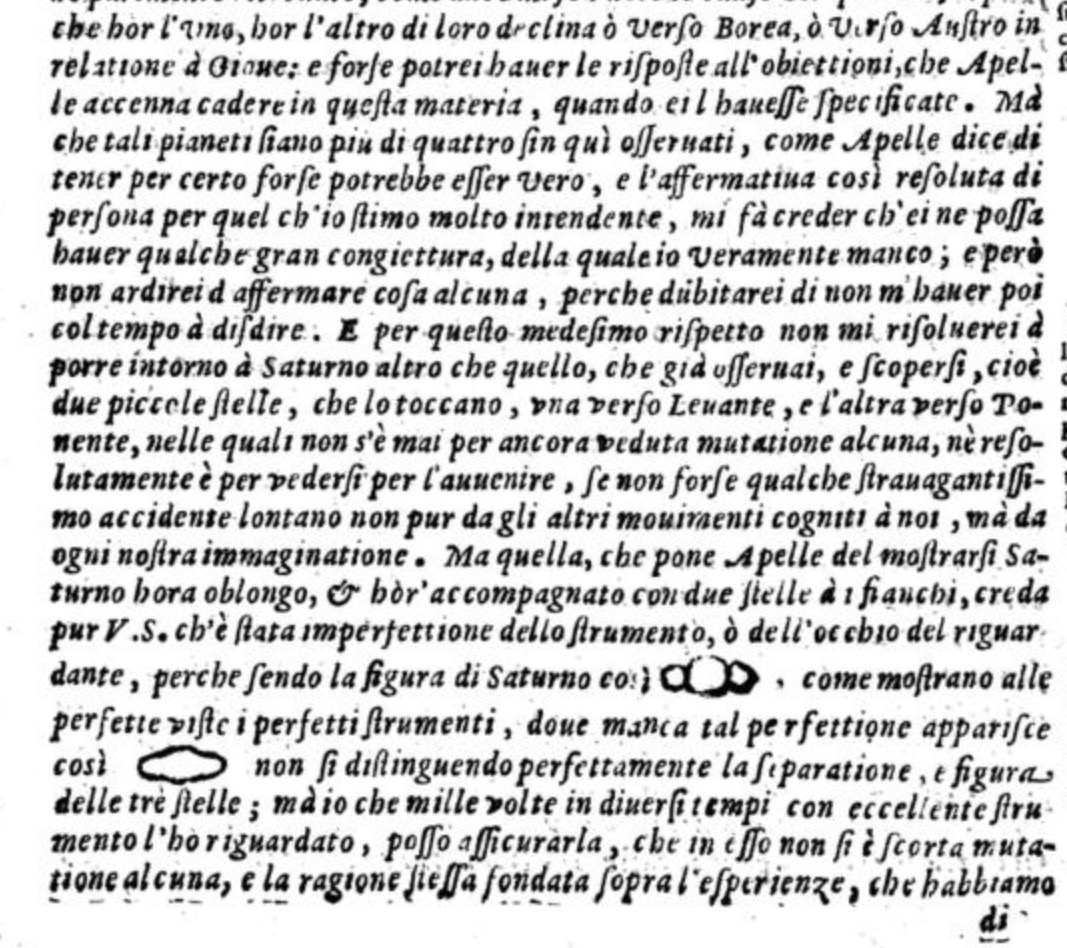
Sketches showing the shape of Saturn through different lenses

- Apelles had tried to make the case that the sunspots were similar to two phenomena Galileo had discovered, the moons of Jupiter and the rings of Saturn. Galileo responds that there is no comparison in either case; the moons of Jupiter (Medicean Stars) move with an absolute regularity he has already described, while Saturn simply bears no comparison to the description Apelles provides of it. (Here Galileo provides two simple in-line sketches to show what he means). Galileo assures his reader that he can confirm, after long observation, that Saturn never changes its shape, as Apelles claims, and never will.
- Mercury, the planet closest to the Sun, completes its transit in about six hours; it makes no sense to propose that spots on some 'orb' which is much closer to the Sun than Mercury would take around fifteen days to complete theirs. Likewise planetary orbits appear constant in their speed, whereas Apelles has shown that sunspots move rapidly in the centre of the Sun but more slowly at its edges.

== Galileo's Second letter – 14 August 1612 ==
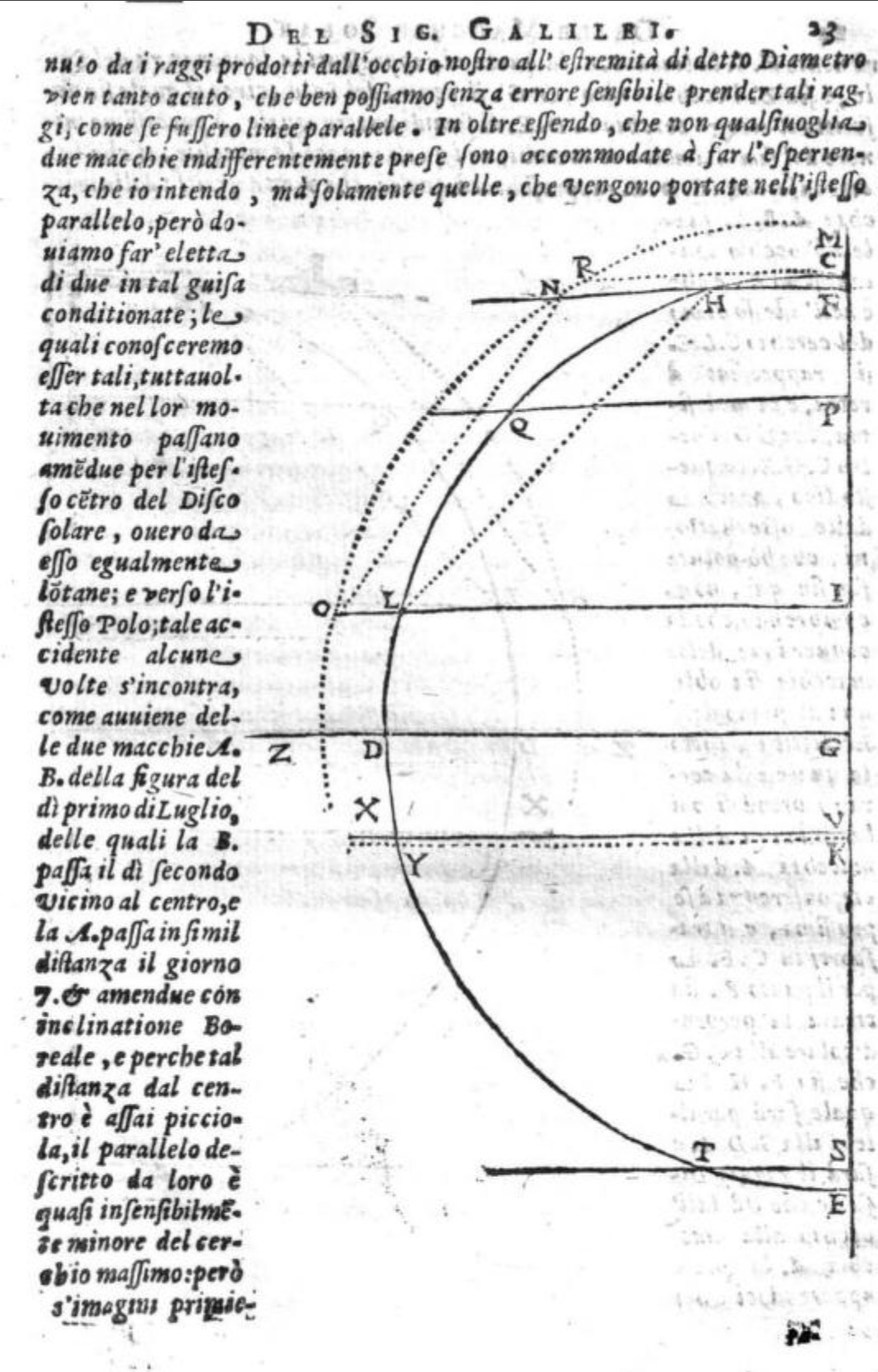
Geometrical diagram of differential foreshortening on the surface of the Sun and above it

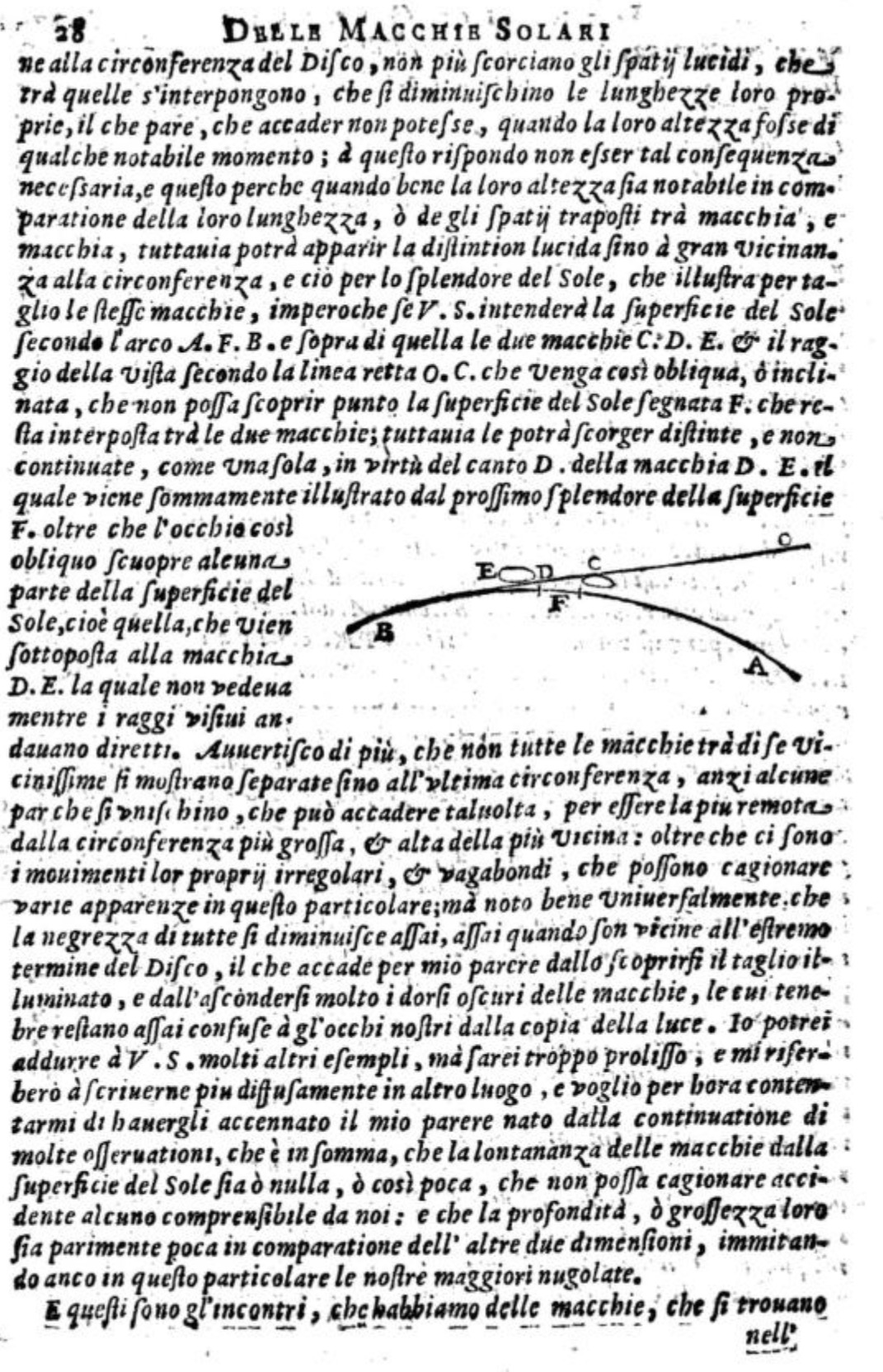
Diagram showing how the gaps between sunspots can clearly be seen even when they are foreshortened

Galileo's second letter restates the key propositions from his first letter, and is otherwise mostly concerned with geometric proofs that the spots are on the surface of the Sun rather than above it. To accompany these proofs Galileo provides 38 detailed illustrations, which allow the reader to see how his observations relate to his calculations.

- Further observations confirm what Galileo originally believed – that the spots were on or very close to the Sun, which carries them round as it rotates on its own axis.
- He notes that as sunspots approach the limit of their movement cross the visible field of the Sun, at the point where they are seen 'sideways on' from Earth, they sometimes appear as thin as a thread; if, as Apelles maintained, the spots were satellites, they would be clearly set apart from the surface of the Sun at this point.
- The apparent acceleration of the spots as they approach the centre of the Sun and their slower speeds towards the edges, are perfectly consistent with a circular rotation on the surface. The growth in apparent size of the gaps between spots as they approach the centre, and their apparent diminution towards the edges of the Sun, likewise confirm this.
- He uses a geometrical diagram to demonstrate the effects of foreshortening, showing how if the sunspots were removed from the surface of the Sun by even a twentieth part of its diameter, there would be a very observable difference in the visible foreshortening effect. The apparent distance to the observer from C to F is seven times smaller than the actual distance on the surface of the Sun from C to H; however, if the spots are just a small way above the surface of the Sun, the apparent distance from C to F corresponds to the actual distance from R to N, which is less than a third the length of C to H. Thus by measuring the differences in the apparent distances between spots as they move across the Sun, it is possible to know with certainty whether the foreshortening corresponds to the proportion CF:CH or to some other proportion. The changes in apparent distance observed leave no doubt on this question.
- He uses a second diagram to demonstrate the gaps between sunspots which can be seen right up to the point where they disappear at the limb of the Sun. This, he says, means they must be low against the sun and thin, rather than high above its surface and thick.
- Galileo then counters a number of arguments that might be put forward to show that sunspots are an effect in the Earth's atmosphere. These were not arguments Apelles had advanced; rather, he had also argued against them. Galileo's points were made for the sake of completeness, although, as he argues 'it is not necessary to waste time in re-examining every other conceivable position [for the sunspots], for anyone will immediately encounter manifest impossibilities and contradictions himself, so long as he has understood the phenomena I have recounted above.'.
- He says that because the spots change shape, it is difficult to be certain whether some complete a full revolution and reappear in changed form after disappearing round to the dark side of the Sun for fourteen or fifteen days. However he believes that this does in fact happen. 'I am inclined to this belief upon seeing a very large one appear and grow continuously while the visible hemisphere turns; since it is credible that it was generated long before its arrival, so it is reasonable to believe that it can last after its departure, such that its duration will be much longer than the time of half a revolution of the Sun. Therefore, some spots can doubtless, or rather necessarily, be seen twice by us.
- He considers arguments about the natural inclination of bodies for different kinds of motion in order to judge whether the spots are on the surface of the Sun or in its atmosphere, and concludes that the regularity of sunspot motion argues that they 'originate in a solid and firm body where the motion of the whole and of the parts is a single one.' (However, in his Third Letter he argued, against Scheiner, that 'there is no one so simple as to grant that the Sun is hard and immutable').
- He describes his method of observing and recording sunspots, discovered by Benedetto Castelli. This is by way of explaining to the reader that the thirty-eight illustrations which follow are highly accurate (i.e. unlike Scheiner's).
- His last main point addresses those who say that his ideas and observations contradict Aristotle. 'If he argued for the immutability of the heavens because in times past no alteration whatsoever had been seen in them, it is entirely credible that if vision had demonstrated to him the things that it makes manifest to us, he would have arrived at the opposite conclusion. And I will further say that I think I contradict Aristotle's doctrine much less... with the supposition of mutable celestial material, than do those who would prefer to treat it as inalterable, because I am sure that he was never as certain of the conclusion of inalterability as he was of the notion that all human discourse must defer to evident experience.'
- He adds a postscript to say that while he was undertaking his observations, a sunspot appeared which was so large it could be seen with the naked eye between 19 and 21 August 1612. This is included in his series of illustrations.

== Galileo's Third Letter – 1 December 1612 ==
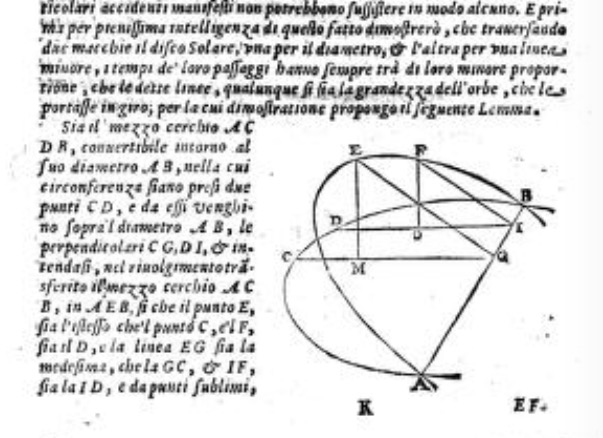
If the arc AEFB is opened out like a flap, whatever angle it stands at, the difference in length between CM and MQ has a constant ratio with the difference in length between FO and OI

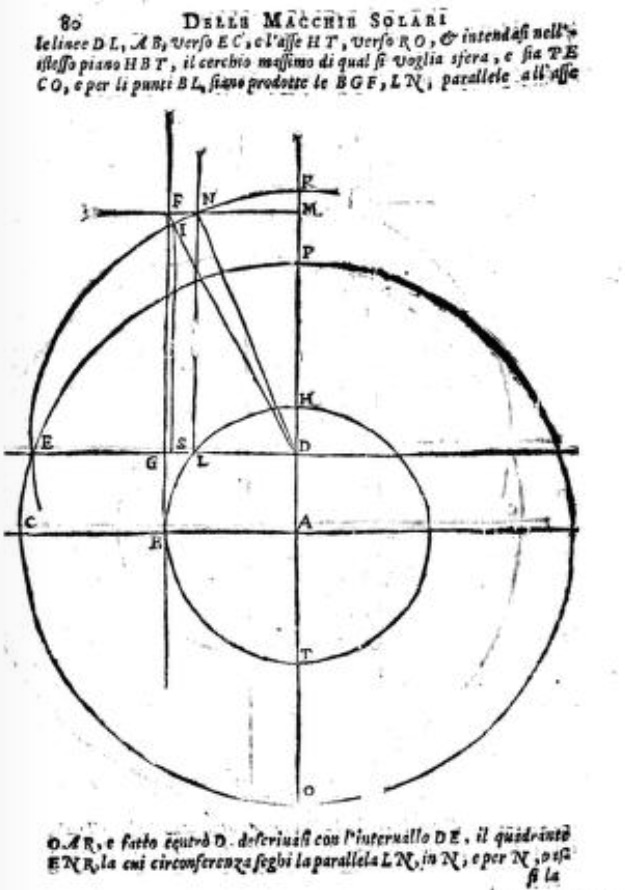
If a sunspot moves along the surface of the Sun's equator from B to A, its transit time is longer than that of another sunspot moving from L to D. However, if the sunspots are not on the surface but above it, at C and E rather than B and L, the differential time of their transit is reduced. (CB equals BA, but EL does not equal LD). The closer the sunspots are to the surface, the more their relative transit times can vary; the further they are from the surface, the less difference in speed will be observed.

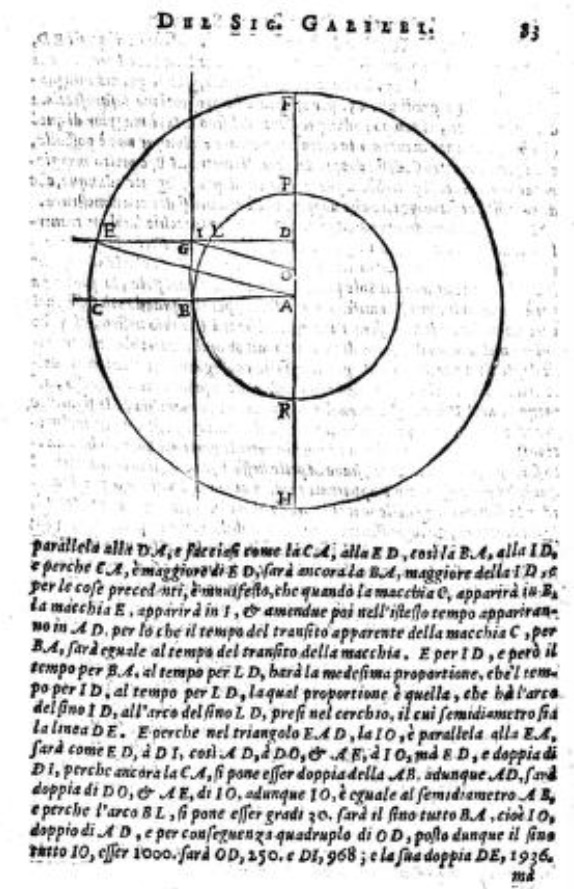
Proof that if a sunspot travels AB in 1 1/7 times the period another travels DL (as Scheiner claimed), then the semidiameter of the Sun (actually AB) would need to be more than twice as large (i.e. even larger than AC).

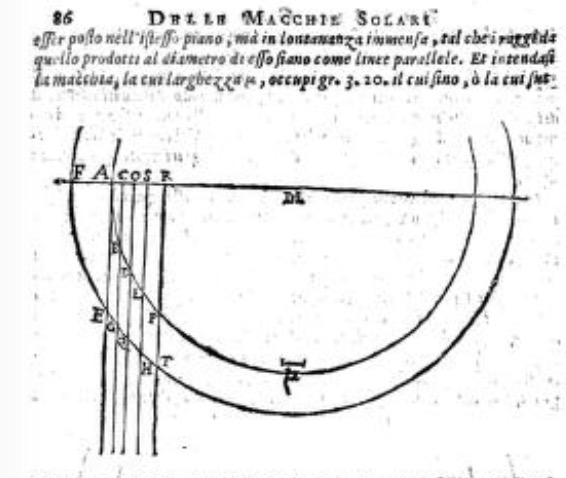
Viewed from above, the width of a sunspot in the middle of the Sun's face at μ will appear six times larger than when it is between B and D. However, if the sunspot sits at a distance above the Sun equivalent to just 5% of its diameter, then its width at μ will be less than three times larger than at GQ.

While Galileo's First and Second Letters had been written in response to Scheiner's Tres Epistolae, his Third Letter responded to Accuratior Disquisitio. Galileo was angry to see that once again Scheiner was making claims about the moons of Jupiter, since he regarded them as his own discovery. To demonstrate the falsehood of Scheiner's assertion that the moons of Jupiter were 'wandering stars', unpredictable in their movement, as well as to display his own clear superiority in observation and calculation of celestial movements, Galileo appended a complete set of Ephemerides for the Jovian moons to his third letter. Galileo shows the critical flaws in Scheiner's geometry, his understanding of the authorities he cites, his reasoning, his observations and indeed his own drawings.

=== Introduction ===
Galileo says there is no point in speculating about the 'essence' of sunspots, or indeed of other things, but since writing his last letter he has spent time thinking about the uniform motion of the sunspots within a specific band around the Sun's surface. He asks, in passing, 'is there not still a controversy over whether the Earth itself remains immobile, or wanders?', which is an oblique reference to the idea, required by Copernicus' model of the universe, that the earth must rotate on its own axis every day. Lastly, he humorously compares scholars who insist that every detail of Aristotle's writing must be true, whether it corresponds with reality or not, with those artists who draw portraits of people in fruit and vegetables. 'As long as these oddities are offered as jokes, they are nice and pleasing... but if someone, perhaps because he had consumed all his studies in a similar style of painting, then wanted to draw the general conclusion that every other method of imitating was imperfect and blameworthy, surely Cigoli and other celebrated painters would laugh at him.'

=== Venus, sunspots and use of authorities ===
Galileo takes up once again the question of whether there is any relation between the transit of Venus and sunspots. He criticises 'Apelles' for setting out a long and complex demonstration of the movement of Venus across the face of the Sun, when it was superfluous to his purpose. He criticises him further for giving an estimate of Venus's size as it crosses the Sun which is wrong, and for supporting this estimate with learned authorities from the past who did not have telescopes. Furthermore, Galileo argues, some of the ancient astronomers, including Ptolemy, made more cogent arguments than 'Apelles' suggests.

Galileo notes that 'Apelles' has shifted his view on sunspots since his first letter. At first he insisted they were all spherical, like little moons; now he says they are irregular in shape, forming and dissolving. He previously said that the spots were at various distances from the Sun, wandering between it and Mercury, but he no longer maintains this view. 'Apelles' argues that the hardness and solidity of the Sun means that the fluid spots cannot be on its surface; but citing the authority of the ancients to confirm the Sun's solidity is pointless, since they had no idea of its structure; in any case the evidence of the spots themselves suggests the very opposite to the traditional view of the Sun's hardness. He agrees with 'Apelles' view that the spots are not chasms or pools on the Sun's surface, but nobody had ever argued that they were.

=== The movement of sunspots ===
A large portion of the Third Letter is taken up with disproving Apelles' assertion that he had observed spots passing across the Sun at different speeds – one, on the diameter, taking sixteen days, and another, at a lower latitude, in just fourteen. (If sunspots moved at differential speeds, this tended to suggest they were moons moving independently of the Sun itself). Galileo says that in his own observations he has never seen this differential rate of movement, but that spots always move at a constant speed relative to each other. First Galileo demonstrates that points on two different sunspot trajectories at two different latitudes produce lines which maintain a constant proportion with each other at any point in the rotation. Next he shows that the larger the sphere on which sunspots appear, the less differential there is in their transit times at the same two latitudes. Finally, he shows that for a spot to move along the diameter of the Sun in a period 1 1/7 as long as another spot at a latitude 30° higher, the diameter of the Sun would need to be more than twice as great as observed. From this he concludes that Apelles is simply wrong, and it is not possible for one spot to traverse the Sun in sixteen days, while another takes only fourteen.

Now Galileo turns to Apelles' illustrations of sunspots, and begins to use them to show how his arguments about sunspot motion are false. He recalls how Apelles depicts them coming into view, foreshortened, before appearing at their full width. He then demonstrates that for the spots Apelles had observed to change in apparent size as they did, they would need to be on the face of the Sun, because if they were even a short distance above its surface the foreshortening effect would be remarkably different. Galileo challenges Apelles' assertion that he had seen different spots moving at different speeds; particularly that he had seen spots on the Sun's diameter rotate more rapidly than those at higher latitudes. This, he says, is contradicted not only by observation but by Apelles' own statement in another place in his work that spots in the middle of the Sun remain longer than those passing nearer its limb. Finally, Apelles' own illustrations clearly show spots transiting the Sun in around 14 1/2 days, and nothing in his illustrations supports his contention that some take 16, and others 9.

=== Observations on other planets ===
Having disproved Apelles' arguments on sunspots, Galileo addresses a number of his other errors. He briefly responds to Apelles' views on extraterrestrial life; then disposes of the idea that the Moon is translucent. He then returns to Apelles' analogy between sunspots and the moons of Jupiter, where he notes that Apelles has subtly moved from arguing that sunspots are like planets, to arguing that planets are like sunspots. 'Carried away by the desire to maintain what he had originally said, and unable to accommodate the spots exactly to the properties once associated with the other stars, [Apelles] has accommodated the stars to the properties that we know belong to the spots.' To dispense once and for all with Apelles' claim that the moons of Jupiter 'appear and disappear', Galileo provides predictions for their positions for the next two months to prove the regularity of their motions.

To demonstrate that natural philosophy must always be led by observation and not try to fit new facts into preconceived frameworks, Galileo comments that the planet Saturn had recently and surprisingly changed its appearance. In his First Letter, he had argued that Saturn never changes its shape, and never will. Now, he agrees, it has changed shape. He does not try to prove his earlier views right in spite of new facts, but makes cautious predictions about how its appearance may change in future.

Galileo concludes his remarks by criticising those who doggedly adhere to Aristotle's views, and then, drawing together all he has said about sunspots, the moons of Jupiter, and Saturn, ends with the first explicit endorsement of Copernicus in his writings:

I think it is not the act of a true philosopher to persist – if I may say so – with such obstinacy in maintaining Peripatetic conclusions that have been found to be manifestly false, believing perhaps that if Aristotle were here today he would do likewise, as if defending what is false, rather than being persuaded by the truth, were the better index of perfect judgement... [and] I say to your Lordship that this star too [i.e. Saturn] and perhaps no less than the emergence of the horned Venus, agrees in a wondrous manner with the harmony of the great Copernican system, to whose universal relations we see such favourable breezes and bright escorts directing us.

== Significance of Letters on Sunspots ==
=== Ideas ===
The common belief until Galileo's time was that the heavens beyond the Moon were both perfect and unchanging. Many of the arguments between Scheiner and Galileo were about things observed in the skies that appeared to be changing, and what the nature and significance of that change was. Although the behaviour of sunspots was the main topic of their debate, they also touched on other disputes, such as the phases of Venus and the moons of Jupiter.

In a letter to Federico Cesi, Galileo said: 'I have finally concluded, and I believe I can demonstrate necessarily, that they [i.e. the sunspots] are contiguous to the surface of the solar body, where they are continually generated and dissolved, just like clouds around the earth, and are carried around by the sun itself, which turns on itself in a lunar month with a revolution similar [in direction] to those other of the planets... which news will be I think the funeral, or rather the extremity and Last Judgement of pseudophilosophy.... I wait to hear the spoutings of great things from the Peripatetics to maintain the immutability of the skies.'

==== 'Flaws' in the Sun ====
The cosmology of Galileo's time, based on Aristotle's Physics, held that the Sun was 'perfect' and unflawed. Only with the invention of the telescope was it possible for sunspots to be systematically observed. Many who had never seen them found the idea of them morally and philosophically repugnant. Those who could see them, like Scheiner, wanted to find an explanation for them within the Aristotelian system. Galileo's arguments in Letters on Sunspots were intended to demonstrate these claims as false; and if they were false, Aristotelian assumptions about the universe could not be true.

==== Moons of Jupiter ====
Galileo had discovered the moons of Jupiter in 1609. Scheiner argued that what appeared to be spots on the Sun were in fact clusters of small moons, thereby trying to deploy one of Galileo's own discoveries as an argument for the Aristotelian model. In his Letters on Sunspots Galileo showed how sunspots were nothing like the moons of Jupiter, and the comparison was false. Scheiner claimed that the sunspots, with their irregular movements, were like the moons of Jupiter whose positions were similarly hard to predict. To counter this argument, Galileo published tables of predictions for the future position of the moons of Jupiter, so that astronomers could easily distinguish between the regular, predictable movements they followed with the ephemeral and irregular sunspots.

==== Rotation of the Sun ====
Showing that the Sun rotated had two effects. Firstly, it showed that the traditional Aristotelian model of the universe must be wrong, because that model assumed that the Sun had only a diurnal (daily) motion around the earth, and not a rotation on its own axis. Secondly, it showed that there was nothing necessarily unusual about rotation of a body in space. In the Aristotelian system, night and day were explained by the Sun moving round a static Earth. For Copernicus' system to work, there had to be an explanation for why half the Earth was not in permanent daylight, and the other in permanent darkness, as it completed its annual motion around the Sun. This explanation was that the Earth rotated on its own axis once every day. However it was very difficult to prove that the Earth was rotating, so to show that the Sun rotated made the Copernican model at least more plausible. While the rotation of the Sun did not prove Copernicus right, it proved his opponents wrong and made his ideas more likely to be true.

==== Phases of Venus ====
In the Letters on Sunspots Galileo responded to claims by Scheiner about the phases of Venus, which were an important question in the astronomy of the time. There were different schools of thought about whether Venus had phases at all – to the naked eye, none were visible. In 1610, using his telescope, Galileo had discovered that Venus, like the Moon, had a full set of phases, but only in Letters on Sunspots did he commit this finding to publication. The fact that there was a full phase of Venus, (similar to a full moon) when Venus was in the same direction in the sky as the Sun meant that at a certain point in its orbit, Venus was on the other side of the Sun to the Earth. This indicated that Venus went around the Sun, and not around the Earth. This provided important evidence in support of the Copernican model of the universe.

==== Copernicus ====
At least as early as 1597, Galileo had concluded that the Copernican model of the universe was correct but had not publicly advocated this position. In Siderius Nuncius Galileo included in his dedication to the Grand Duke of Tuscany the words ' while all the while with one accord they [i.e. the planets] complete all together mighty revolutions every ten years round the centre of the universe, that is, round the Sun.' In the body of the text itself, he stated briefly that in a forthcoming work, 'I will prove that the Earth has motion', which is an indirect allusion to the Copernican system, but that is all. Copernicus is not mentioned by name. It is at the end of the Third Letter that Galileo explicitly declares his belief in the Copernican system.

==== Movement of the Sun ====
Galileo remarks in one passage that the Sun might not be revolving, but in another he states more definitely that the Sun does have a motion, and wonders what causes it. Here he establishes a connection between cosmology and mechanics. Galileo wrote, "I seem to have observed that physical bodies have physical inclination to some motion." Letters in Sunspots is also the first of his works to mention the concept of inertia, which would later become Newton's first law of motion.

=== Language ===
While Scheiner wrote his letters in Latin, Galileo's reply was in Italian. Scheiner did not speak Italian, so Welser had to have Galileo's letters translated into Latin so he could read them. This was not the first time Galileo had published in Italian, and Galileo was not the first natural philosopher to publish in Italian (for example Lodovico delle Colombe's account of the 1604 supernova was in Italian, as was Galileo's reply). However Letters on Sunspots was the first book the Accademia dei Lincei published in Italian. Galileo later said of his preference for Italian over Latin:

'I wrote in Italian because I wished everyone to be able to read what I wrote.... I see young men.... who, although furnished.... with a decent set of brains, yet not being able to understand things written in gibberish [i.e. Latin], take it into their heads that in these crabbed folios there must be some grand hocus-pocus of logic and philosophy much too high up for them to think of jumping at. I want them to know, that as nature has given eyes to them, just as well as to philosophers, for the purpose of seeing her works, she has also given them brains for examining and understanding them.'

While Scheiner's lack of Italian hindered his response to Galileo in 1612 while they corresponded through Welser, it also meant that when Galileo published Il Saggiatore in 1623, which accused Scheiner of plagiarism, Scheiner was unaware of this until he happened to visit Rome the following year.

=== Use of diagrams and illustrations ===
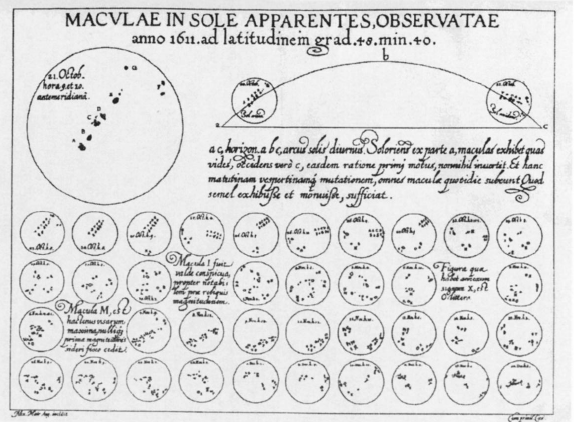
Alexander Mayr engraved Scheiner's observation plate. The plate shows Scheiner's sunspot observations from 1612.

Most readers of the time did not have a telescope, so could not see sunspots for themselves – they relied on descriptions and illustrations to make clear what they looked like. For this reason the quality and number of illustrations was essential in building public understanding. Scheiner's book of letters had contained illustrations of sunspots which were mostly 2.5 cm in diameter, leaving little space for detail and portraying sunspots as solid, dark entities. Scheiner himself had described them as 'not terribly exact' and 'drawn without precise measurement'. He also indicated that his drawings were not to scale, and the spots in his illustration had been drawn disproportionately large 'so that they would be more conspicuous.' A reader looking at these illustrations might be inclined to agree with Scheiner's view that sunspots were probably planets.

Although the sunspots were constantly changing position, Scheiner presented his observations over a period of six weeks in a single fold out plate. All of his figures are small except for the observations in the top left corner. He admitted to his readers that his drawings were not made to scale, and that other factors such as variations in the weather, lack of time, or other impediments may have reduced their accuracy. Scheiner also showed the formation of spots in different orientations. Sometimes the configurations of the spots were linear following consecutive days, but the orientations became more complex over time that there was a lack of an obvious pattern.

For Galileo to persuade his readers that sunspots were not planets but a much more transient and nebulous phenomenon, he needed illustrations which were larger, more detailed, more nuanced, and more 'natural.' Letters on Sunspots carried 38 engravings of sunspots, providing a visual narrative of the sun's appearance from 2 June – 8 July 1612, with some additional illustrations from August. This extensive visual representation, with its large scale and high-quality reproduction, allowed readers to see for themselves how sunspots waxed and waned as the sun rotated. The impact of this series of illustrations was to create a near-photographic sense of reality. This sense undermined the claims made by Scheiner before any argument was mounted to refute them.

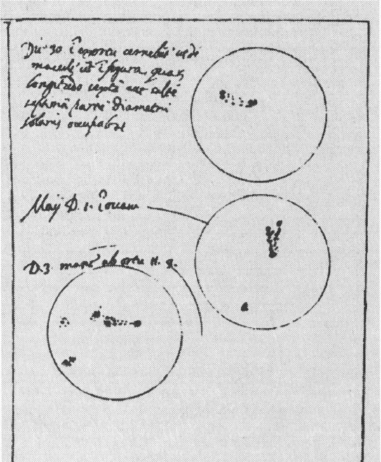
Galileo sketched his sunspot observations. This is one of his earliest sketches from Le Opere di Galileo Galilei

Galileo and Prince Cesi selected Matthaeus Greuter to create the sunspot illustrations. Originally from Strasbourg and a convert from Protestantism, Greuter moved to Rome and set up as a printer specialising in work for the Jesuit order. His work ranged from devotional images of saints through to mathematical diagrams. This relationship may have recommended him as one whose involvement in a publication would perhaps ease its path through censorship; in addition his craftsmanship was outstanding, and he devised a novel etching technique specially in order to make the sunspot illustrations as realistic as possible. Galileo drew sunspots by projecting an image of the Sun through his helioscope onto a large piece of white paper, on which he had already used a compass to draw a circle. He then sketched the sunspots in as they appeared projected onto his sheet. To make his illustrations as realistic as possible, Greuter reproduced them at full size, even with the mark of the compass point from Galileo's original. Greuter worked from Galileo's original drawings, with the verso on the copperplate and the image traced through and etched.

The cost of the thirty-eight copperplates was significant, amounting to fully half of the production costs of the edition. Because half the copies of the Letters also contained the Apelles Letters, Greuter reproduced the illustrations that Alexander Mair had done for Scheiner's book, allowing Galileo's readers to compare two distinct views of the sunspots. He reduced Mair's drawings further in size, and converted nine of the twelve from etchings or engravings into woodcuts, which lacked the subtlety of Mair's originals. Scheiner was evidently impressed by Greuter's work, as he commissioned him to create the illustrations for his own magnum opus Rosa Ursina in 1626. The 1619 work Galileo co-wrote with Mario Guiducci, Discourse on Comets, mocked Scheiner for the 'badly colours and poorly-drawn images' in his work on Sunspots.

=== Making predictions to test a hypothesis ===
In modern science falsifiability is generally considered important. In De revolutionibus orbium coelestium Copernicus had published both a theoretical description of the universe and a set of tables and calculating methods for working out the future positions of the planets. In Letters on Sunspots Galileo did as Copernicus had done – he elaborated his ideas on the form and substance of sunspots, and accompanied this with tables of predictions for the position of the moons of Jupiter. In part this was to demonstrate that Scheiner was wrong in comparing sunspots with the moons. More generally, Galileo was using his predictions to establish the validity of his ideas – if he could be demonstrably right about the complex movements of many small moons, his readers could take that as a token of his wider credibility. This approach was the opposite of the method of Aristotelian astronomers, who did not build theoretical models based on data, but looked for ways of explaining how the available data could be accommodated within existing theory.

== Scholarly reception ==
Some astronomers and philosophers, such as Kepler, did not publish views on the ideas in Galileo's Letters on Sunspots. Most scholars with an interest in the topic divided into those who supported Scheiner's view that sunspots were planets or other bodies above the surface of the Sun, or Galileo's that they were on or very near its surface. From the middle of the seventeenth century the debate about whether Scheiner or Galileo was right died down, partly because the number of sunspots was drastically reduced for several decades in the Maunder Minimum, making observation harder. After the Paris Observatory was built in 1667, Jean-Dominique Cassini instituted a programme of systematic observations, but he and his colleagues could find little pattern in the appearance of sunspots after many years of observation. However Cassini's observation did bear out Galileo's argument that sunspots indicated that the Sun was rotating, and Cassini did discover the rotation of Mars and Jupiter, which supported Galileo's contention that both the Earth and the Sun rotated.

=== Christoph Scheiner ===
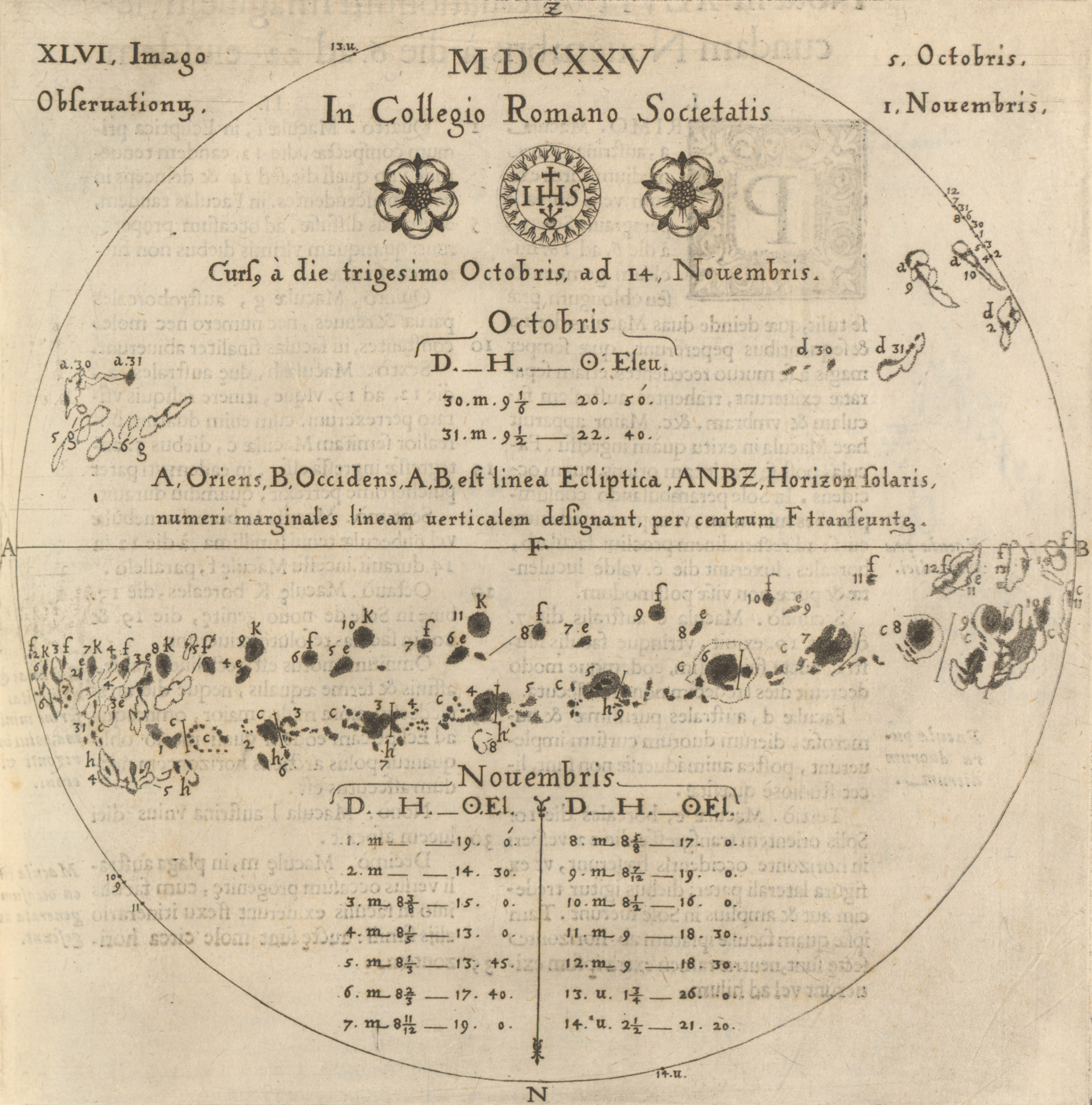
Scheiner's sunspots

As Cesi had feared, the hostile tone of the Letters on Sunspots towards Scheiner helped turn the Jesuits against Galileo. In 1619, Mario Guiducci published A Discourse on Comets, which was actually mostly written by Galileo, and which included an attack on Scheiner, although its focus was the work of another Jesuit, Orazio Grassi. In 1623, Galileo wrote Il Saggiatore (The Assayer), which accused Scheiner of trying to steal Galileo's ideas.

In 1624, on a visit to Rome, Scheiner discovered that in The Assayer, Galileo had accused him of plagiarism. Furious, he decided to stay in Rome and devote himself to proving his own expertise in sunspots. His major work on the topic was Rosa Ursina (1626–1630). It is widely believed, though there is no direct evidence, that the bitter dispute with Scheiner was a factor in bringing Galileo to trial in 1633, and indeed that Scheiner may have worked behind the scenes to bring the trial about. As a result of pursuing this dispute with Galileo and the years of research it entailed, Scheiner eventually became the world's leading expert on sunspots.

=== Raffaelo delle Colombe ===
Together with Niccolò Lorini and Tommaso Caccini, delle Colombe was one of three Florentine Dominicans who opposed Galileo. Along with Raffaelo's brother Lodovico delle Colombe they formed what Galileo called the 'Pigeon League'. Caccini and delle Colombe both used the pulpit to preach against Galileo and the ideas of Copernicus, but only delle Colombe is known to have preached, on two separate occasions, against Galileo's ideas about sunspots. The first occasion was 26 February 1613, when his sermon concluded with these words:

'That ingenious Florentine mathematician of ours [i.e. Galileo] laughs at the ancients who made the sun the most clear and clean of even the smallest spot, whence they formed the proverb 'to seek a spot on the sun.' But he, with the instrument called by him a telescope makes visible that it has regular spots, as by observation of days and months he had demonstrated. But this more truly God does, because 'the heavens are not of the world in His sight'. If spots are found in the suns of the just, do you think they will be found in the moons of the unjust?'

The second sermon against sunspots was on 8 December 1615, when the Letters on Sunspots had already been referred to the Inquisition for review. The sermon was delivered in Florence cathedral on the Feast of the Immaculate Conception.

'an ingenious academic took for his device a mirror in the face of the sun with the motto 'it shows what is received'. That means he had carved in his spirit I do not know what kind of beloved sun. But what would be better for Mary? Who could fixedly look at the infinite light of the Divine Sun, were it not for this virginal mirror, that in itself conceives it [the light] and renders it to the world? 'Born to us, given to us from an intact virgin?' This is 'Let what is received, be shown'. For one who seeks defects where there are none, is it not to be said to him 'he seeks a spot in the sun?' The sun is without spot, and the mother of the sun is without spot, from where Jesus is born.'

=== The Roman Inquisition ===
On 25 November 1615, the Inquisition decided to investigate the Letters on Sunspots because it had been mentioned by Tommaso Caccini and Gianozzo Attavanti in their complaint about Galileo. Copies of the text were issued to the Inquisition's theological experts on 19 February 1616. On the morning of 23 February they met and agreed two propositions to be censured (that the Sun is the centre of the world, and that the Earth is not the centre of the world, but moves). Neither proposition is contained in Letters on Sunspots. Shortly after the decision of the Inquisition, the Congregation of the Index placed Copernicus' De Revolutionibus on the Index. Letters on Sunspots was however not banned or required to undergo corrections. This meant that while Catholic scholars could no longer discuss heliocentrism, they could discuss the nature and origin of sunspots freely.

=== Francesco Sizzi ===
In 1611, before the Letters on Sunspots appeared, Francesco Sizzi had published Dianoia Astronomica, attacking the ideas of Galileo's earlier work, Siderius Nuncius. In 1612 he went to Paris and devoted himself to the study of sunspots. In 1613 he wrote to Galileo's friend Orazio Morandi, confirming that his circle of colleagues in France agreed with Galileo that sunspots were not freshly generated with each revolution of the Sun, but could be observed passing round it several times. Furthermore, Sizzi drew to Galileo's attention something he had not yet noticed – that the inclination of the path travelled by sunspots varied with the seasons. Thus in one part of the year the sunspots appeared to be travelling upwards across the face of the Sun; in another part of the year they appeared to be travelling downward. Galileo was to adopt this observation and deploy it in his Dialogue Concerning the Two Chief World Systems in 1632 to demonstrate that the Earth tilted on its axis as it orbited the Sun.

=== Johannes Kepler ===
In his work Phaenomenon singulare (1609) Kepler had described what he took to be the transit of Mercury, observed on 29 May 1607. However, after Michael Maestlin pointed out Galileo's work to him, he corrected himself in 1617 in his Ephemerides, recognising long after the event that what he had seen was sunspots. Welser sent Kepler a copy of Scheiner's first three Apelles letters, and Kepler replied before Galileo, arguing, like him, that Sunspots must be on the surface of the Sun and not satellites. Kepler reached this conclusion only by studying the evidence Scheiner's had provided, without making any direct observations of his own. Kepler did not however engage with the claims of Galileo in "Letters on Sunspots" or have further involvement in public discussion on the question.

=== Michael Maestlin ===
In his treatise on the comet of 1618, Astronomischer Discurs von dem Cometen, so in Anno 1618, Michael Maestlin made reference to the work of Fabricius and cited sunspots as evidence of the mutability of the heavens. He made no reference to the work of either Scheiner or Galileo, although he was aware of both. He concluded that sunspots are definitely on or near the Sun, and not a phenomenon of the Earth's atmosphere; that it is only thanks to the telescope that they can be studied, but that they are not a new phenomenon; and that whether they are on the surface of the Sun or move around it is a question to which there is no reliable answer.

=== Jean Tarde ===
The French churchman Jean Tarde visited Rome in 1615, and he also met Galileo in Florence and discussed sunspots with him, as well as Galileo's other work. He did not agree with Galileo's view that the sunspots were on or near the surface of the Sun, and held rather that they were small planets. On his return to France in 1615 he built an observatory at La Roque-Gageac where he studied sunspots further. In 1620 he published Borbonia Sidera, dedicated to Louis XIII, in which he declared the spots to be the 'Bourbon planets'.

=== Charles Malapert ===
The Belgian Jesuit Charles Malapert agreed with Tarde that the apparent sunspots were in fact planets. His book, published in 1633, was dedicated to Philip IV of Spain and christened them 'Austrian stars' in honour of the house of Habsburg.

=== Pierre Gassendi ===
Pierre Gassendi made his own observations of sunspots between 1618 and 1638. He agreed with Galileo that the spots were on the surface of the Sun, not satellites orbiting it. Like Galileo, he used observation of the spots to estimate the speed of the Sun's rotation, which he gave as 25–26 days. Most of his observations were not published however and his notes were not kept systematically. He did however discuss his findings with Descartes.

=== Rene Descartes ===
René Descartes was interested in sunspots and his correspondence shows that he was actively gathering information about them when he was working on Le Monde. He was aware of Scheiner's Rosa Ursine published in 1630, which conceded Galileo's point that sunspots are actually on the face of the Sun. Whether he knew of Galileo's ideas primarily through Scheiner or whether he read Letters on Sunspots directly is not known, but in his Principles of Philosophy (1644) he refers to "spots which appear on the sun's surface also revolve around it in planes inclined to that of the ecliptic", which appears to indicate at least a knowledge of Galileo's argument. Descartes used sunspots as an illustration of his Vortex Theory.

=== Giovanni Battista Riccioli ===
In his 1651 work Almagestum Novum, Giovanni Battista Riccioli set out 126 arguments against the Copernican model of the universe. In his 43rd argument, Riccioli considered the points Galileo had made in his Letters on Sunspots, and asserted that a heliocentric (Copernican) explanation of the phenomenon was more speculative, while a geocentric model allowed for a more parsimonious explanation and was thus more satisfactory (ref: Occam's Razor).

As Riccioli explained it, whether the Sun went round the Earth or the Earth round the Sun, three movements were necessary to explain the movement of sunspots. If the Earth moves around the Sun, the necessary movements were the annual motion of the Earth, the diurnal motion of the Earth, and the rotation of the Sun. However, if the Sun moved around the Earth, this accounted for the same movement as both the annual and diurnal motions in the Copernican model. In addition, the annual gyration of the Sun at its poles, and the rotation of the Sun had to be added to completely account for the movement of sunspots. While both models required three movements, the heliocentric model required the Earth to make two movements (annual and diurnal) which could not be demonstrated, while the geocentric model was based on three observable celestial movements, and was accordingly preferable.

=== Athanasius Kircher ===
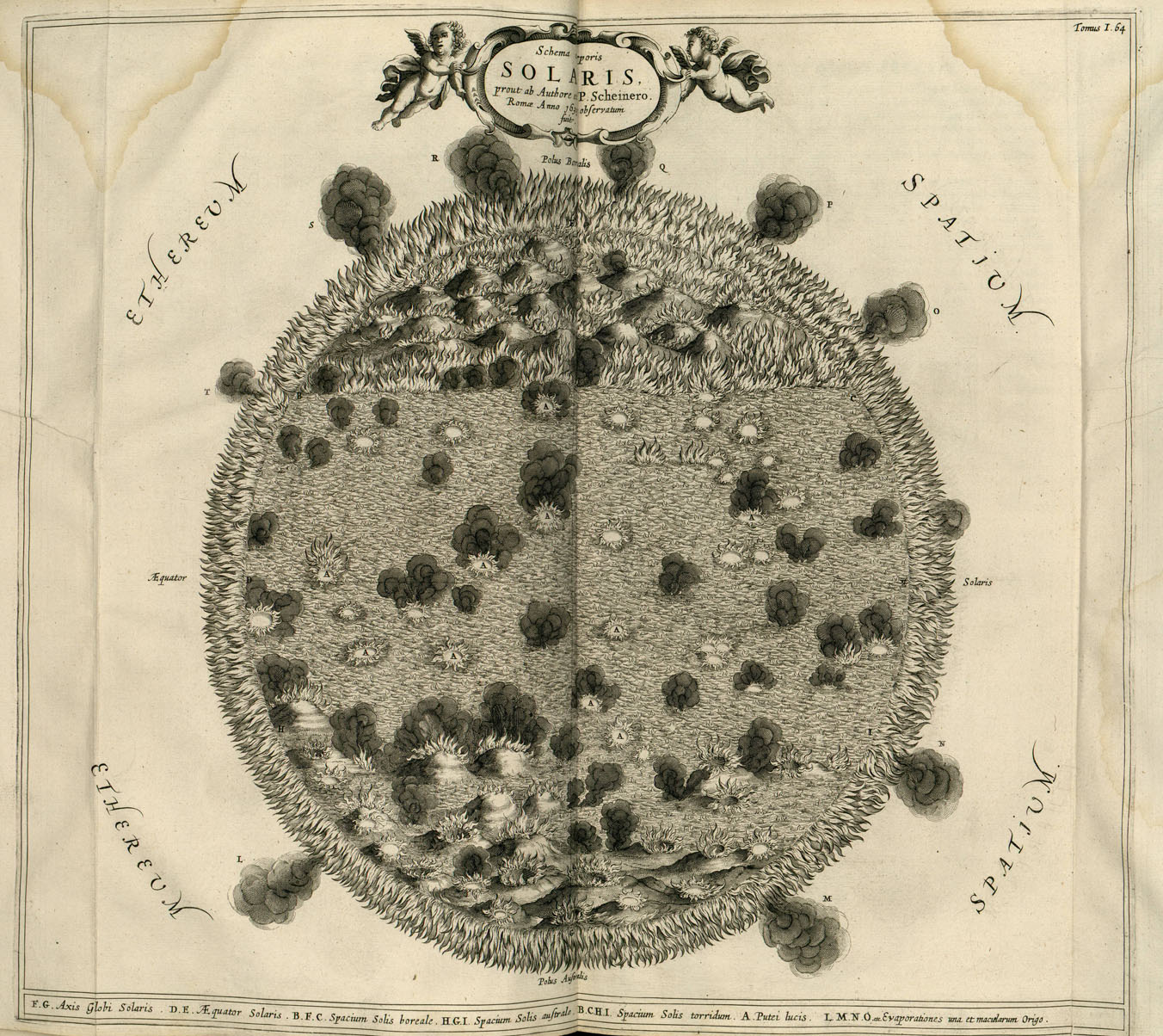
Illustration of sunspots in Kircher's Mundus Subterraneus

Athanasius Kircher succeeded Scheiner in the Chair of Mathematics at the Collegio Romano. In Mundus Subterraneus (1664), he rejected the views of both Scheiner and Galileo, reviving an earlier idea of Kepler's and arguing that sunspots were in fact smoke emanating from fires on the surface of the Sun, and that the surface of the Sun was therefore indeed perfect as the Aristotelians believed, although apparently disfigured by blemishes. Sunspots, he argued, just like the planets in astrology, had a profound influence on the Earth.

== Sunspots in Galileo's later writings ==
=== The Assayer ===
In Il Saggiatore (The Assayer) (1623) Galileo was mostly concerned with faults in Orazio Grassi's arguments about comets, but in the introductory section he wrote :

'How many men attacked my Letters on Sunspots, and under what disguises! The material contained therein ought to have opened to the minds eye much room for admirable speculation; instead it met with scorn and derision. Many people disbelieved it or failed to appreciate it. Others, not wanting to agree with my ideas, advanced ridiculous and impossible opinions against me; and some, overwhelmed and convinced by my arguments, attempted to rob me of that glory which was mine, pretending not to have seen my writings and trying to represent themselves as the original discoverers of these impressive marvels.'

Christoph Scheiner took this to be an attack on him. He therefore used Rosa Ursina to mount a bitter riposte to Galileo, although he also conceded Galileo's main point, that sunspots exist on the Sun's surface or just above it, and thus that the Sun is not flawless.

=== Dialogue Concerning the Two Chief World Systems ===
In 1632 Galileo published Dialogo sopra i due Massimi Sistemi del Mondo (Dialogue Concerning the Two Chief World Systems), a fictitious four day-long discussion about natural philosophy between the characters Salviati (who argued for Copernican ideas and was effectively a mouthpiece of Galileo), Sagredo, who represented the interested but less well-informed reader, and Simplicio, who argued for Aristotle, and whose arguments were possibly a parody of those made by Pope Urban VIII. The book was reviewed by the Roman Inquisition and in 1633 Galileo was interrogated and found 'vehemently suspect of heresy' because of it. He was forced to renounce his belief in heliocentrism, sentenced to house arrest and banned from publishing anything further. The Dialogue was placed on the Index.

The Dialogue is a broad synthesis of Galileo's thinking about physics, planetary movement, how far we can rely on our senses in making judgements about the world, and how we make intelligent use of evidence. It drew together all his findings and recapitulated arguments made in earlier years on specific topics. For this reason, there is no 'section on sunspots' in the Dialogue. Rather, they are referred to at various points in arguments about other topics. In the Dialogue, that sunspots are on the surface of the Sun and not planets was taken as established fact. The discussion concerned what inferences could be drawn about the universe from their rotation. Galileo did not argue that the existence of sunspots conclusively proved that the Copernican model was correct and the Aristotelian model wrong; he explained how the rotation of sunspots could be explained in both models, but that the Aristotelian explanation was much more complicated and suppositional.

Day 1 The discussion opens with Salviati arguing that two key Aristotelian arguments are incompatible; either the heavens are perfect and unchanging, or that the evidence of the senses is preferable to argument and reasoning; either we should rely on the evidence of our senses when they tell us changes (such as sunspots) take place, or we should not. Holding both positions is not tenable.

Day 2: Salviati argues that sunspots prove the rotation of the Sun on its axis. Aristotelians had previously held that it was impossible for a heavenly body to have more than one natural motion. Aristotelians must therefore choose between their determination that only one natural movement is possible (in which case the Sun is static, as Copernicus argued); or they must explain how a second natural motion occurs if they wish to maintain that the Sun makes a daily orbit of the Earth. This argument is resumed on Day 3 of the Dialogue.

== See also ==
- Copernican Revolution
- List of Catholic clergy scientists
- Solar observation
