= Niccolò Lorini =

Niccolò Lorini was an Italian historian, born in Florence in 1544. He served as a Preacher General Dominican Order and a lecturer in ecclesiastical history at the University of Florence. He is most famous for his involvement in the Galileo trails, the Galileo affair. He was a member of the Pigeon League named for one of Galileo's rivals, Lodovico delle Colombe. Lorini instigated the events of 1616 by sending the Roman Inquisition a copy of Galileo's letter to Benedetto Castelli.

== See also ==
- "Letter to Benedetto Castelli"
