= Cosimo Boscaglia =

Italian philosopher and professor

Cosimo Boscaglia (c. 1550 – 1621) was a professor of philosophy at the University of Pisa in Italy. He is the first person known to have accused Galileo of possible heresy for defending the heliocentric system of Copernicus, in 1613.
