= Galileo affair =

17th-century conflict between Galileo Galilei and the Roman Catholic Church

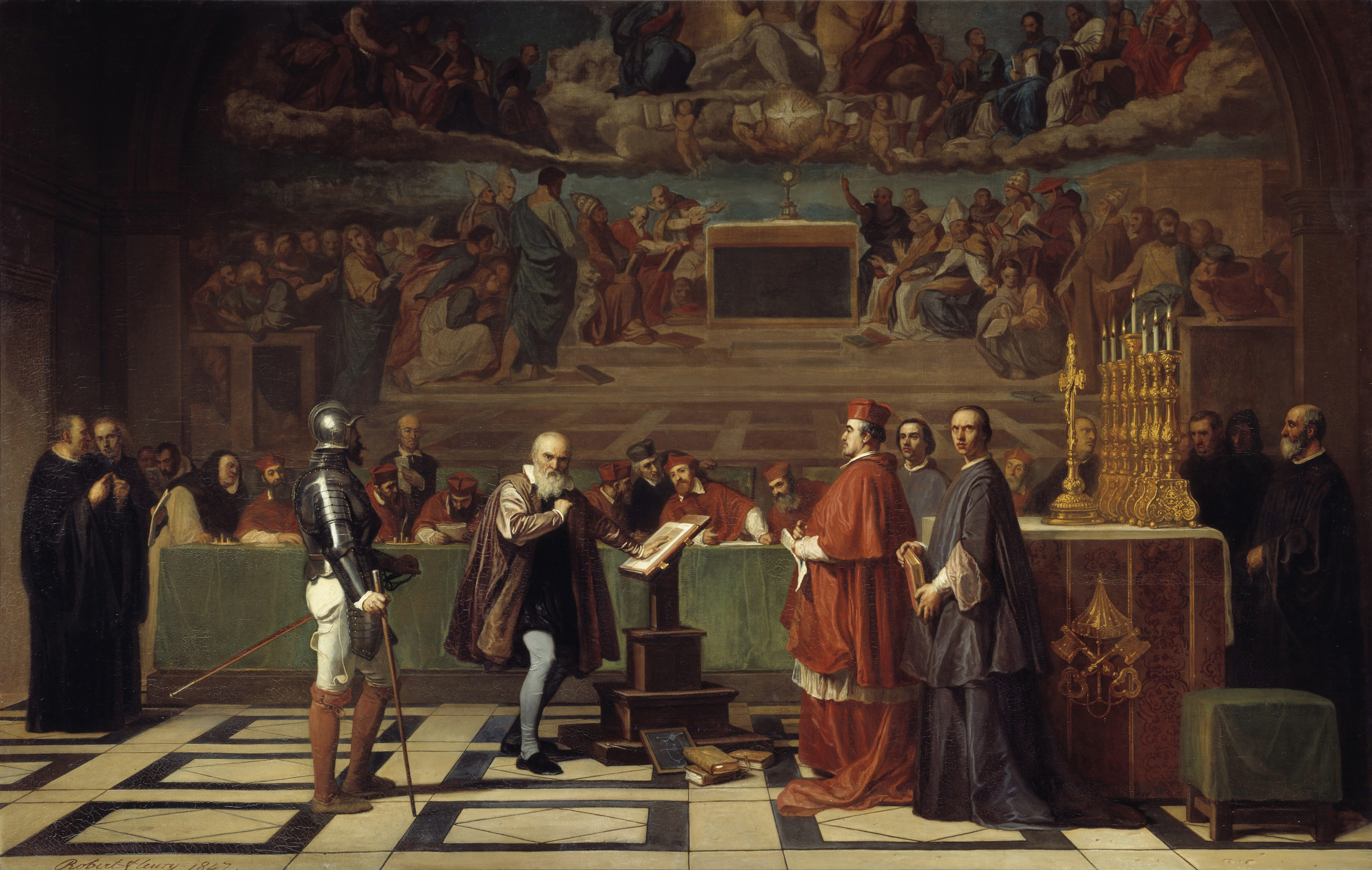
Galileo before the Holy Office, a 19th-century painting by Joseph-Nicolas Robert-Fleury

The Galileo affair was an early 17th century political, religious, and scientific controversy regarding the astronomer Galileo Galilei's defence of heliocentrism, the idea that the Earth revolves around the Sun. It pitted supporters and opponents of Galileo within both the Catholic Church and academia against each other through two phases: an interrogation and condemnation of Galileo's ideas by a panel of the Roman Inquisition in 1616, and a second trial in 1632 which led to Galileo's house arrest and a ban on his books.

In 1610, Galileo published his Sidereus Nuncius (Starry Messenger) describing the observations that he had made with his new, much stronger telescope, amongst them the Galilean moons of Jupiter. With these observations and additional observations that followed, such as the phases of Venus, he promoted the heliocentric theory of Nicolaus Copernicus published in De revolutionibus orbium coelestium in 1543. Galileo's opinions were met with opposition within the Catholic Church, and in 1616 the Inquisition declared heliocentrism to be both scientifically indefensible and heretical. Galileo went on to propose a theory of tides in 1616, and of comets in 1619; he argued (incorrectly) that the tides were evidence for the motion of the Earth.

In 1632, Galileo published his Dialogue Concerning the Two Chief World Systems, which defended heliocentrism while describing geocentrists as "simpletons". Responding to mounting controversy, the Roman Inquisition tried Galileo in 1633 and found him "vehemently suspect of heresy", sentencing him to house arrest. At this point, heliocentric books were banned and Galileo was ordered to abstain from holding, teaching or defending heliocentric ideas after the trial.

The affair was complex, with Pope Urban VIII originally being a patron and supporter of Galileo before turning against him. Urban initially gave Galileo permission to publish on the Copernican theory so long as he treated it as a hypothesis, but after the publication of the Dialogue in 1632, the patronage was broken off. Historians of science have since corrected numerous false interpretations of the affair.

== Initial controversies ==
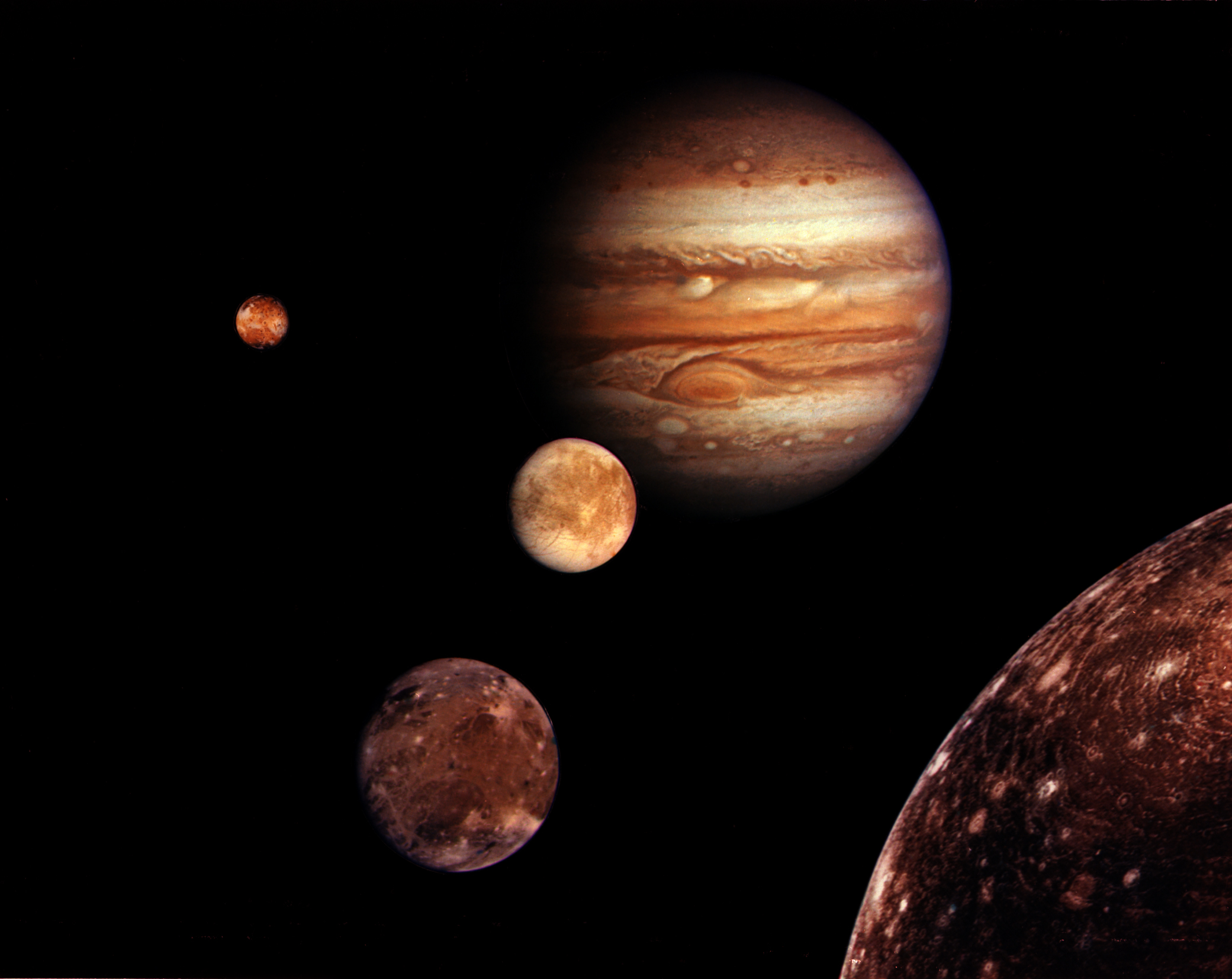
Photomontage of the Galilean moons. Galileo viewed these moons as a smaller Copernican system within the Solar System and used them to support heliocentrism.

In 1610 Galileo Galilei observed with his telescope that Venus showed phases, despite remaining near the Sun in Earth's sky (first image). This proved that it orbits the Sun and not Earth, as predicted by Copernicus's heliocentric model and disproved the then conventional geocentric model (second image).

Galileo began his telescopic observations in the later part of 1609, and by March 1610 was able to publish a small book, The Starry Messenger (Sidereus Nuncius), describing some of his discoveries: mountains on the Moon, lesser moons in orbit around Jupiter, and the resolution of what had been thought to be very cloudy masses in the sky (nebulae) into collections of stars too faint to see individually without a telescope. Other observations followed, including the phases of Venus and the existence of sunspots.

Galileo's contributions caused difficulties for theologians and natural philosophers of the time, as they contradicted scientific and philosophical ideas based on those of Aristotle and Ptolemy and closely associated with the Catholic Church. In particular, Galileo's observations of the phases of Venus, which showed it to circle the Sun, and the observation of moons orbiting Jupiter, contradicted the geocentric model of Ptolemy, which was backed and accepted by the Roman Catholic Church, and supported the Copernican model advanced by Galileo.

Jesuit astronomers, experts both in Church teachings, science, and in natural philosophy, were at first skeptical and hostile to the new ideas; however, within a year or two the availability of good telescopes enabled them to repeat the observations. In 1611, Galileo visited the Collegium Romanum in Rome, where the Jesuit astronomers by that time had repeated his observations. Christoph Grienberger, one of the Jesuit scholars on the faculty, sympathized with Galileo's theories, but was asked to defend the Aristotelian viewpoint by Claudio Acquaviva, the Father General of the Jesuits. Not all of Galileo's claims were completely accepted: Christopher Clavius, the most distinguished astronomer of his age, never was reconciled to the idea of mountains on the Moon, and outside the collegium many still disputed the reality of the observations. In a letter to Kepler of August 1610, Galileo complained that some of the philosophers who opposed his discoveries had refused even to look through a telescope:

My dear Kepler, I wish that we might laugh at the remarkable stupidity of the common herd. What do you have to say about the principal philosophers of this academy who are filled with the stubbornness of an asp and do not want to look at either the planets, the moon or the telescope, even though I have freely and deliberately offered them the opportunity a thousand times? Truly, just as the asp stops its ears, so do these philosophers shut their eyes to the light of truth.

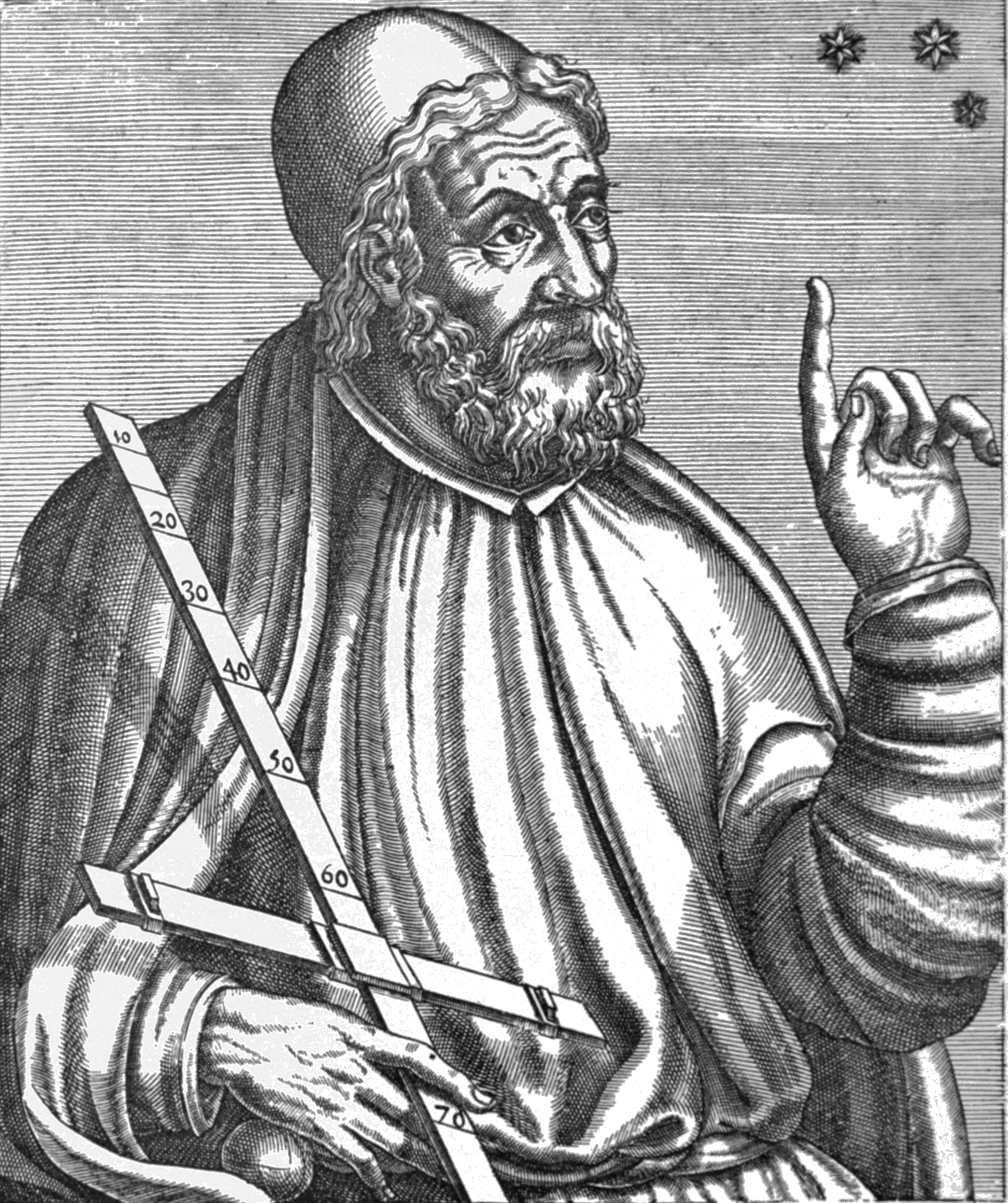
Claudius Ptolemy (A.D. 90–168), whose geocentric system was adopted by the Catholic Church, and supplanted by the work of Copernicus and Galileo in the 16th and 17th centuries.

In 1611, the same year that Galileo visited the Collegium Romanum, his theories first came to the attention of the Roman Inquisition. A commission of cardinals working with the inquisition made inquiries into Galileo's activities, and asked the city of Padua if he had any connections to Cesare Cremonini, a professor at the university of Padua who had been charged with heresy by the Inquisition. Galileo and Cremonini had been referred by the Holy Office of Padua to the Venetian Inquisition in 1604, however the condemnation had been dismissed due to the opposition of the Venetian state. The cardinals' inquiries marked the first time Galileo's name was brought before the Roman inquisition.

Geocentrists who did verify and accept Galileo's findings had an alternative to Ptolemy's model in an alternative geocentric (or "geo-heliocentric") model proposed some decades earlier by Tycho Brahe – a model in which, for example, Venus circled the Sun. Tycho argued that the distance to the stars in the Copernican system would have to be 700 times greater than the distance from the Sun to Saturn. (The nearest star other than the Sun, Proxima Centauri, is over 28,000 times the distance from the Sun to Saturn.) Moreover, the only way the stars could be so distant and still appear the sizes they do in the sky would be if even average stars were gigantic – at least as big as the orbit of the Earth, and of course vastly larger than the Sun. (See the articles on the Tychonic System and Stellar parallax.)

Galileo became involved in a dispute over priority in the discovery of sunspots with Christoph Scheiner, a Jesuit. This became a bitter lifelong feud. Neither of them, however, was the first to recognise sunspots – the Chinese had already been familiar with them for centuries.

At this time, Galileo also engaged in a dispute over the reasons that objects float or sink in water, siding with Archimedes against Aristotle. The debate was unfriendly, and Galileo's blunt and sometimes sarcastic style, though not extraordinary in academic debates of the time, made him enemies such as the Florentine nobleman Lodovico delle Colombe. During this controversy one of Galileo's friends, the painter Lodovico Cardi da Cigoli, informed him that a group of malicious opponents led by delle Colombe, which Cigoli subsequently referred to derisively as "the Pigeon league", was plotting to cause him trouble over the motion of the Earth, or anything else that would serve the purpose. According to Cigoli, one of the plotters asked a priest to denounce Galileo's views from the pulpit, but the latter refused. Nevertheless, three years later another priest, Tommaso Caccini, a member of the "Pigeon League", did in fact do precisely that, as described below.

== Bible argument ==
In the Catholic world prior to Galileo's conflict with the Church, the majority of educated people subscribed to the Aristotelian geocentric view that the Earth was the centre of the universe and that all heavenly bodies revolved around the Earth, though Copernican theories were used to reform the calendar in 1582.

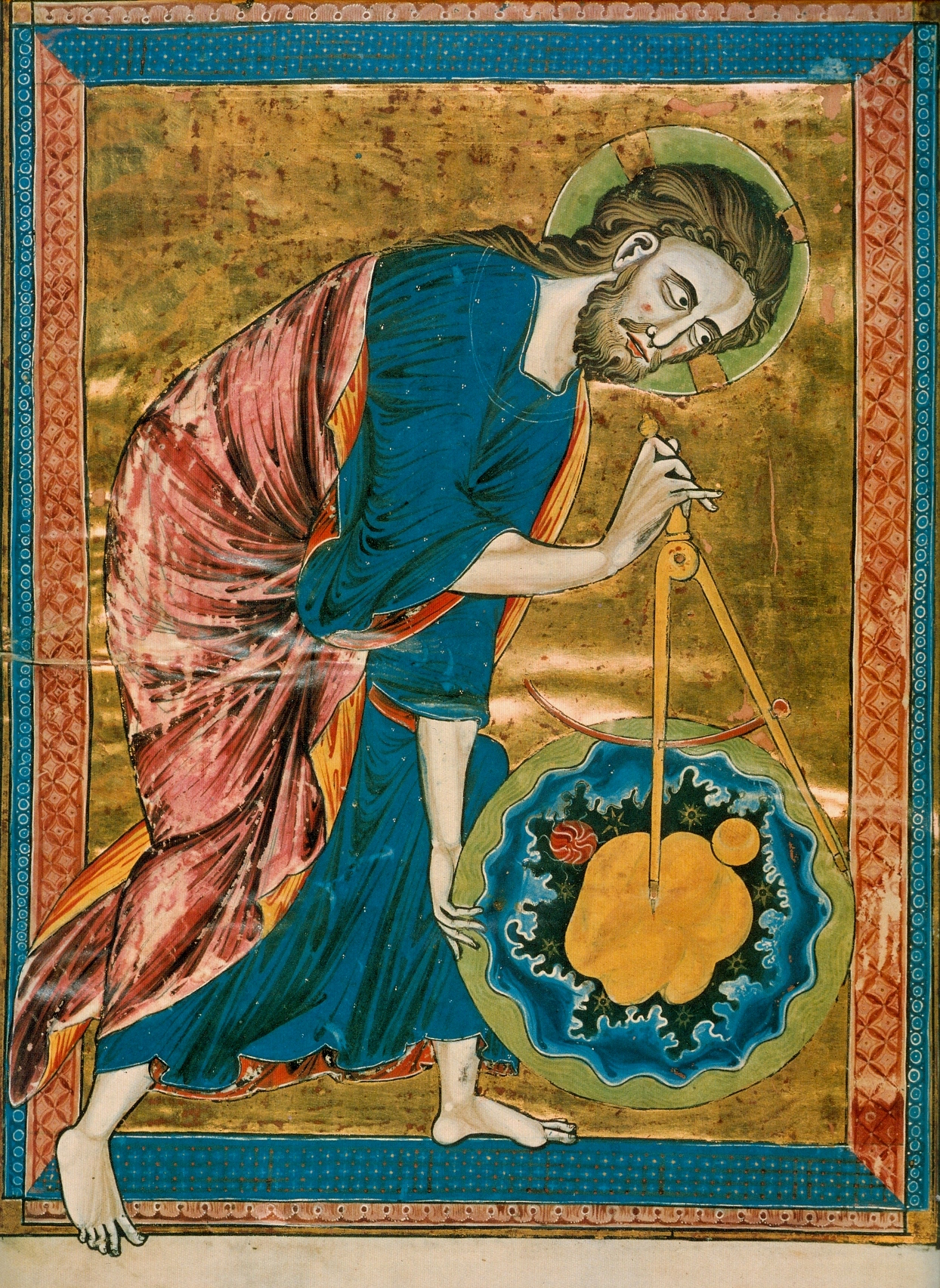
Christian painting of God creating the cosmos (Bible Moralisee, French, 13th century)

Geostaticism agreed with a literal interpretation of Scripture in several places, such as 1 Chronicles 16:30, Psalm 93:1, Psalm 96:10, Psalm 104:5, Ecclesiastes 1:5 (but see varied interpretations of Job 26:7). Heliocentrism, the theory that the Earth was a planet, which along with all the others revolved around the Sun, contradicted both geocentrism and the prevailing theological support of the theory.

One of the first suggestions of heresy that Galileo had to deal with came in 1613 from a professor of philosophy, poet and specialist in Greek literature, Cosimo Boscaglia. In conversation with Galileo's patron Cosimo II de' Medici and Cosimo's mother Christina of Lorraine, Boscaglia said that the telescopic discoveries were valid, but that the motion of the Earth was obviously contrary to Scripture:

Dr. Boscaglia had talked to Madame [Christina] for a while, and though he conceded all the things you have discovered in the sky, he said that the motion of the Earth was incredible and could not be, particularly since Holy Scripture obviously was contrary to such motion.

Galileo was defended on the spot by his former student Benedetto Castelli, now a professor of mathematics and Benedictine abbot. The exchange having been reported to Galileo by Castelli, Galileo decided to write a letter to Castelli, expounding his views on what he considered the most appropriate way of treating scriptural passages which made assertions about natural phenomena. Later, in 1615, he expanded this into his much longer Letter to the Grand Duchess Christina.

Tommaso Caccini, a Dominican friar, appears to have made the first dangerous attack on Galileo. Preaching a sermon in Florence at the end of 1614, he denounced Galileo, his associates, and mathematicians in general (a category that included astronomers). The biblical text for the sermon on that day was Joshua 10, in which Joshua makes the Sun stand still; this was the story that Castelli had to interpret for the Medici family the year before. It is said, though it is not verifiable, that Caccini also used the passage from Acts 1:11, "Ye men of Galilee, why stand ye gazing up into heaven?".

== First meetings with theological authorities ==
In late 1614 or early 1615, one of Caccini's fellow Dominicans, Niccolò Lorini, acquired a copy of Galileo's letter to Castelli. Lorini and other Dominicans at the Convent of San Marco considered the letter of doubtful orthodoxy, in part because it may have violated the decrees of the Council of Trent:

...to check unbridled spirits, [the Holy Council] decrees that no one relying on his own judgement shall, in matters of faith and morals pertaining to the edification of Christian doctrine, distorting the Scriptures in accordance with his own conceptions, presume to interpret them contrary to that sense which the holy mother Church... has held or holds...

— Decree of the Council of Trent (1545–1563). Quoted in Langford, 1992.

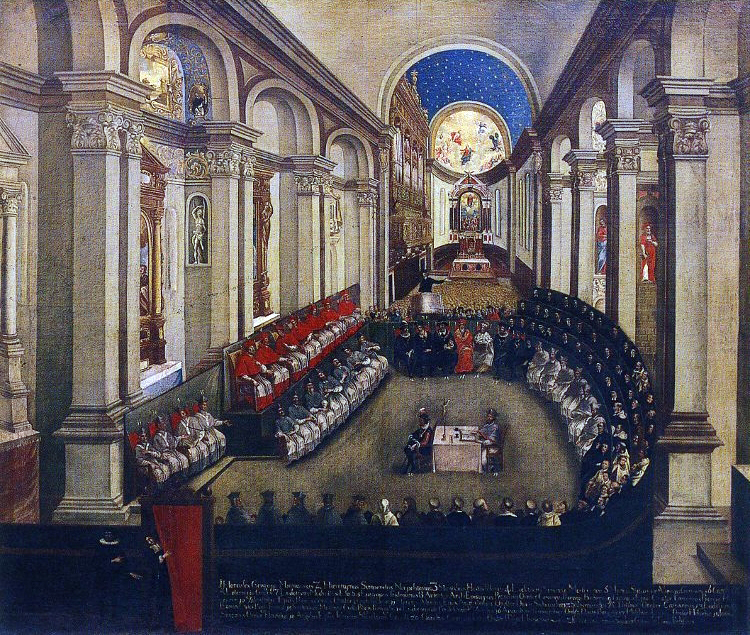
The Council of Trent (1545–63) sitting in the Basilica di Santa Maria Maggiore. The Roman Inquisition suspected Galileo of violating the decrees of the council. Museo Diocesano Tridentino, Trento.

Lorini and his colleagues decided to bring Galileo's letter to the attention of the Inquisition. In February 1615, Lorini accordingly sent a copy to the Secretary of the Inquisition, Cardinal Paolo Emilio Sfondrati, with a covering letter critical of Galileo's supporters:

All our Fathers of the devout Convent of St. Mark feel that the letter contains many statements which seem presumptuous or suspect, as when it states that the words of Holy Scripture do not mean what they say; that in discussions about natural phenomena the authority of Scripture should rank last... . [The followers of Galileo] were taking it upon themselves to expound the Holy Scripture according to their private lights and in a manner different from the common interpretation of the Fathers of the Church...

— Letter from Lorini to Cardinal Sfrondato, Inquisitor in Rome, 1615. Quoted in Langford, 1992

On March 19, Caccini arrived at the Inquisition's offices in Rome to denounce Galileo for his Copernicanism and various other alleged heresies supposedly being spread by his pupils.

Galileo soon heard reports that Lorini had obtained a copy of his letter to Castelli and was claiming that it contained many heresies. He also heard that Caccini had gone to Rome and suspected him of trying to stir up trouble with Lorini's copy of the letter. As 1615 wore on he became more concerned, and eventually determined to go to Rome as soon as his health permitted, which it did at the end of the year. By presenting his case there, he hoped to clear his name of any suspicion of heresy, and to persuade the Church authorities not to suppress heliocentric ideas.

In going to Rome Galileo was acting against the advice of friends and allies, and of the Tuscan ambassador to Rome, Piero Guicciardini.

== Bellarmine ==
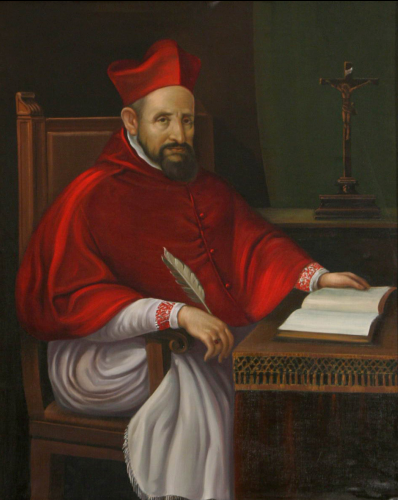
Cardinal Robert Bellarmine (1542–1621), who deliberated upon Galileo's writings in 1615–6, and ordered him to refrain from holding, teaching or discussing Copernicanism

Cardinal Robert Bellarmine, one of the most respected Catholic theologians of the time, was called on to adjudicate the dispute between Galileo and his opponents. The question of heliocentrism had first been raised with Cardinal Bellarmine, in the case of Paolo Antonio Foscarini, a Carmelite father; Foscarini had published a book, Lettera ... sopra l'opinione ... del Copernico, which attempted to reconcile Copernicus with the biblical passages that seemed to be in contradiction. Bellarmine at first expressed the opinion that Copernicus's book would not be banned, but would at most require some editing so as to present the theory purely as a calculating device for "saving the appearances" (i.e. preserving the observable evidence).

Foscarini sent a copy of his book to Bellarmine, who replied in a letter of April 12, 1615. Galileo is mentioned by name in the letter, and a copy was soon sent to him. After some preliminary salutations and acknowledgements, Bellarmine begins by telling Foscarini that it is prudent for him and Galileo to limit themselves to treating heliocentrism as a merely hypothetical phenomenon and not a physically real one. Further on he says that interpreting heliocentrism as physically real would be "a very dangerous thing, likely not only to irritate all scholastic philosophers and theologians, but also to harm the Holy Faith by rendering Holy Scripture as false". Moreover, while the topic was not inherently a matter of faith, the statements about it in Scripture were so by virtue of who said them – namely, the Holy Spirit. He conceded that if there were conclusive proof, "then one would have to proceed with great care in explaining the Scriptures that appear contrary; and say rather that we do not understand them, than that what is demonstrated is false". However, demonstrating that heliocentrism merely "saved the appearances" could not be regarded as sufficient to establish that it was physically real. Although he believed that the former may well have been possible, he had "very great doubts" that the latter would be, and in case of doubt it was not permissible to depart from the traditional interpretation of Scriptures. His final argument was a rebuttal of an analogy that Foscarini had made between a moving Earth and a ship on which the passengers perceive themselves as apparently stationary and the receding shore as apparently moving. Bellarmine replied that in the case of the ship the passengers know that their perceptions are erroneous and can mentally correct them, whereas the scientist on the Earth clearly experiences that it is stationary and therefore the perception that the Sun, Moon and stars are moving is not in error and does not need to be corrected.

Bellarmine found no problem with heliocentrism so long as it was treated as a purely hypothetical calculating device and not as a physically real phenomenon, but he did not regard it as permissible to advocate the latter unless it could be conclusively proved through current scientific standards. This put Galileo in a difficult position, because he believed that the available evidence strongly favoured heliocentrism, and he wished to be able to publish his arguments.

== Francesco Ingoli ==
In addition to Bellarmine, Monsignor Francesco Ingoli initiated a debate with Galileo, sending him in January 1616 an essay disputing the Copernican system. Galileo later stated that he believed this essay to have been instrumental in the action against Copernicanism that followed in February. According to philosopher Maurice Finocchiaro, Ingoli had probably been commissioned by the Inquisition to write an expert opinion on the controversy, and the essay provided the "chief direct basis" for the ban. The essay focused on eighteen physical and mathematical arguments against heliocentrism. It borrowed primarily from the arguments of Tycho Brahe, and it notedly mentioned Brahe's argument that heliocentrism required the stars to be much larger than the Sun. Ingoli wrote that the great distance to the stars in the heliocentric theory "clearly proves ... the fixed stars to be of such size, as they may surpass or equal the size of the orbit circle of the Earth itself". Ingoli included four theological arguments in the essay, but suggested to Galileo that he focus on the physical and mathematical arguments. Galileo did not write a response to Ingoli until 1624, in which, among other arguments and evidence, he listed the results of experiments such as dropping a rock from the mast of a moving ship.

== Inquisition and first judgment, 1616 ==
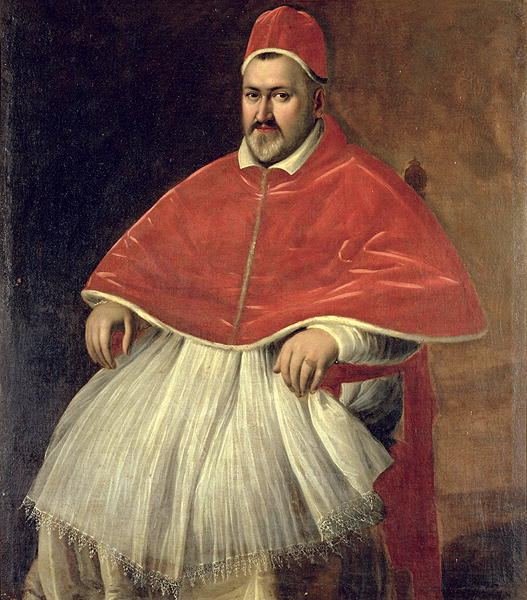
Pope Paul V (1552–1621), who ordered that the inquisitorial commission's 1616 judgement be delivered to Galileo by Cardinal Bellarmine (Caravaggio)

=== Deliberation ===
On February 19, 1616, the Inquisition asked a commission of theologians, known as qualifiers, about the propositions of the heliocentric view of the universe. Historians of the Galileo affair have offered different accounts of why the matter was referred to the qualifiers at this time. Beretta points out that the Inquisition had taken a deposition from Gianozzi Attavanti in November 1615, as part of its investigation into the denunciations of Galileo by Lorini and Caccini. In this deposition, Attavanti confirmed that Galileo had advocated the Copernican doctrines of a stationary Sun and a mobile Earth, and as a consequence the Tribunal of the Inquisition would have eventually needed to determine the theological status of those doctrines. It is however possible, as surmised by the Tuscan ambassador, Piero Guiccardini, in a letter to the Grand Duke, that the actual referral may have been precipitated by Galileo's aggressive campaign to prevent the condemnation of Copernicanism.

=== Judgement ===
On February 24 the Qualifiers delivered their unanimous report: the proposition that the Sun is stationary at the centre of the universe is "foolish and absurd in philosophy, and formally heretical since it explicitly contradicts in many places the sense of Holy Scripture"; the proposition that the Earth moves and is not at the centre of the universe "receives the same judgement in philosophy; and ... in regard to theological truth it is at least erroneous in faith". The original report document was made widely available in 2014.

At a meeting of the cardinals of the Inquisition on the following day, Pope Paul V instructed Bellarmine to deliver this result to Galileo, and to order him to abandon the Copernican opinions; should Galileo resist the decree, stronger action would be taken. On February 26, Galileo was called to Bellarmine's residence and ordered,

to abstain completely from teaching or defending this doctrine and opinion or from discussing it... to abandon completely... the opinion that the sun stands still at the center of the world and the earth moves, and henceforth not to hold, teach, or defend it in any way whatever, either orally or in writing.

— The Inquisition's injunction against Galileo, 1616.

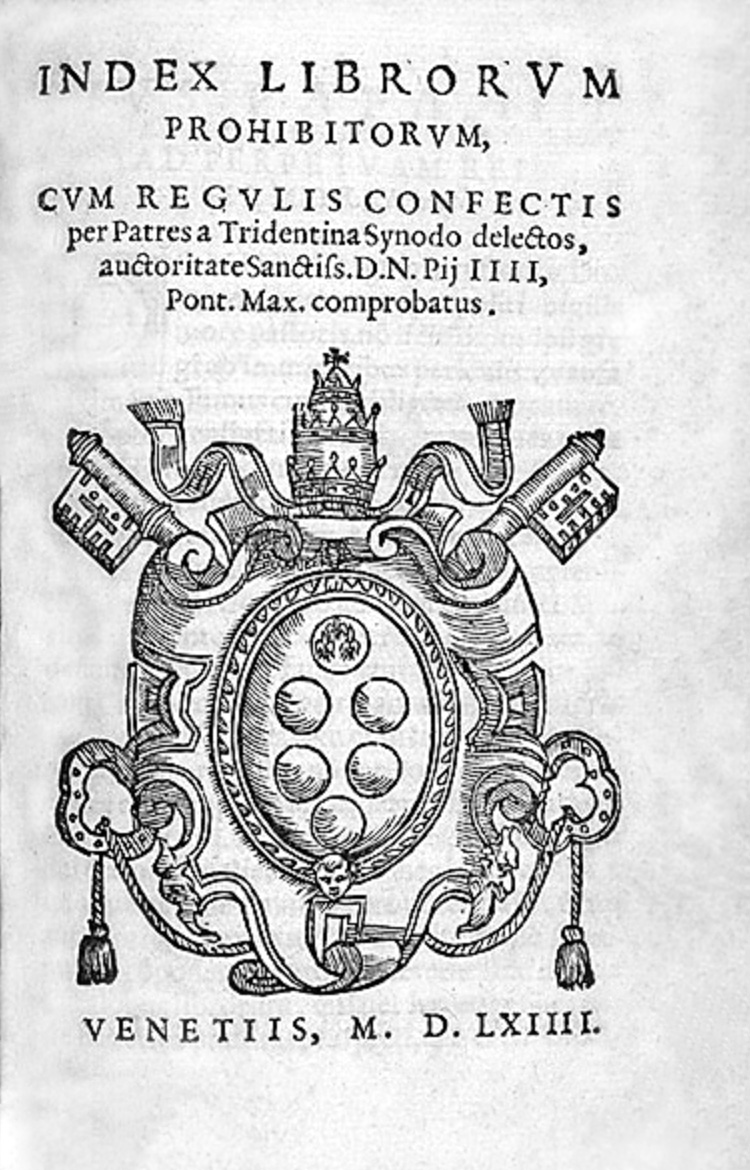
The Index Librorum Prohibitorum, a list of books banned by the Catholic Church. Following the Inquisition's 1616 judgment, the works of Copernicus, Galileo, Kepler and others advocating heliocentrism were banned.

With no attractive alternatives, Galileo accepted the orders delivered, even sterner than those recommended by the Pope. Galileo met again with Bellarmine, apparently on friendly terms; and on March 11 he met with the Pope, who assured him that he was safe from prosecution so long as he, the Pope, should live. Nonetheless, Galileo's friends Sagredo and Castelli reported that there were rumors that Galileo had been forced to recant and do penance. To protect his good name, Galileo requested a letter from Bellarmine stating the truth of the matter. This letter assumed great importance in 1633, as did the question whether Galileo had been ordered not to "hold or defend" Copernican ideas (which would have allowed their hypothetical treatment) or not to teach them in any way. If the Inquisition had issued the order not to teach heliocentrism at all, it would have been ignoring Bellarmine's position.

In the end, Galileo did not persuade the Church to stay out of the controversy, but instead saw heliocentrism formally declared false. It was consequently termed heretical by the Qualifiers, since it contradicted the literal meaning of the Scriptures, though this position was not binding on the Church.

=== Copernican books banned ===
Following the Inquisition's injunction against Galileo, the papal Master of the Sacred Palace ordered that Foscarini's Letter be banned, and Copernicus' De revolutionibus suspended until corrected. The papal Congregation of the Index preferred a stricter prohibition, and so with the Pope's approval, on March 5 the Congregation banned all books advocating the Copernican system, which it called "the false Pythagorean doctrine, altogether contrary to Holy Scripture".

Francesco Ingoli, a consultor to the Holy Office, recommended that De revolutionibus be amended rather than banned due to its utility for calendrics. In 1618, the Congregation of the Index accepted his recommendation, and published their decision two years later, allowing a corrected version of Copernicus' book to be used. The uncorrected De revolutionibus remained on the Index of banned books until 1758.

Galileo's works advocating Copernicanism were therefore banned, and his sentence prohibited him from "teaching, defending… or discussing" Copernicanism. In Germany, Kepler's works were also banned by the papal order.

== Dialogue Concerning the Two Chief World Systems ==
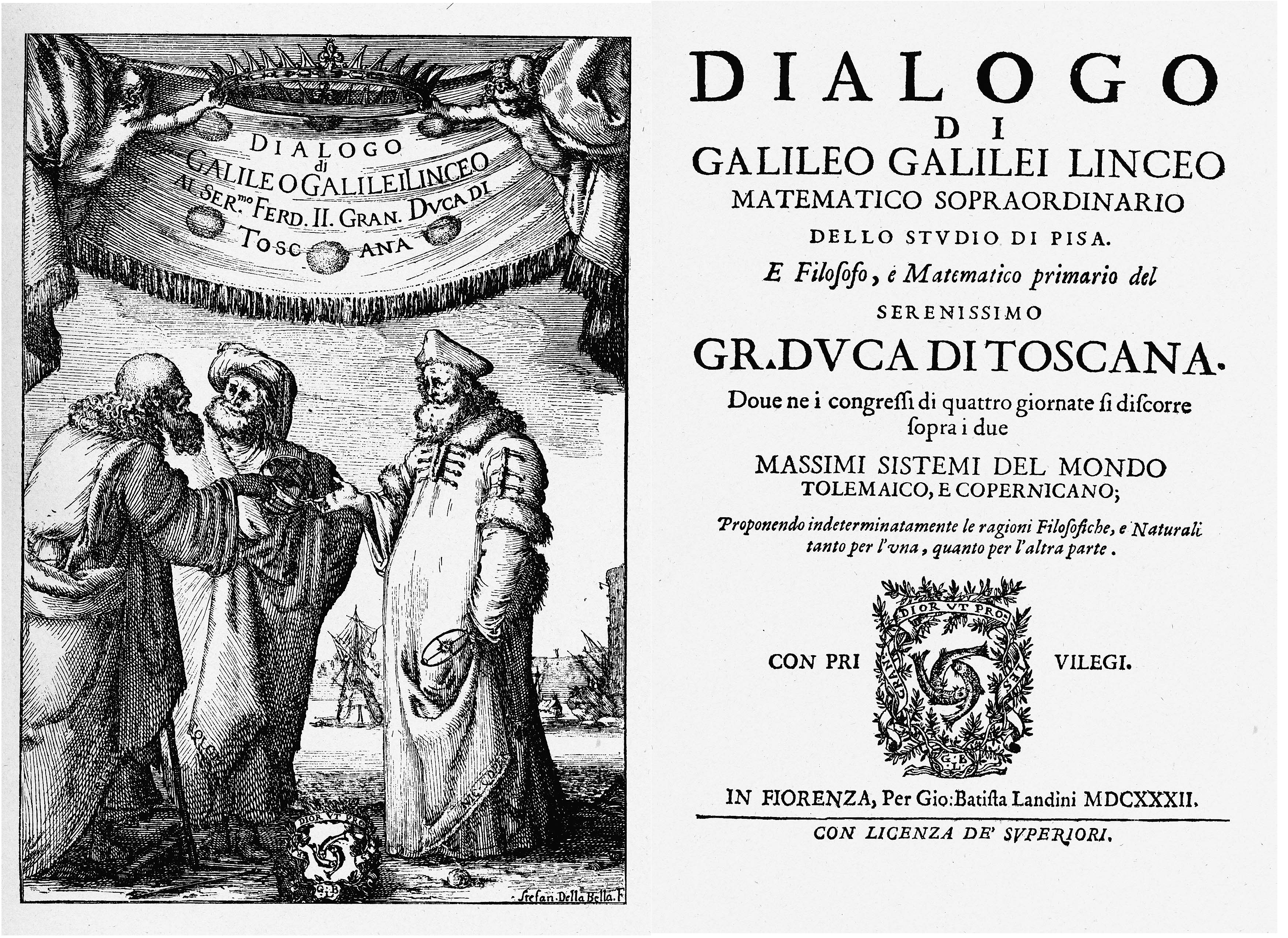
Frontispiece and title page of Galileo's Dialogue, in which Galileo advocated heliocentrism

In 1623, Pope Gregory XV died and was succeeded by Pope Urban VIII who showed greater favor to Galileo, particularly after Galileo traveled to Rome to congratulate the new Pontiff.

Galileo's Dialogue Concerning the Two Chief World Systems, which was published in 1632 to great popularity, was an account of conversations between a Copernican scientist, Salviati, an impartial and witty scholar named Sagredo, and a ponderous Aristotelian named Simplicio, who employed stock arguments in support of geocentricity, and was depicted in the book as being an intellectually inept fool. Simplicio's arguments are systematically refuted and ridiculed by the other two characters with what Youngson calls "unassailable proof" for the Copernican theory (at least versus the theory of Ptolemy – as Finocchiaro points out, "the Copernican and Tychonic systems were observationally equivalent and the available evidence could be explained equally well by either"), which reduces Simplicio to baffled rage, and makes the author's position unambiguous. Indeed, although Galileo states in the preface of his book that the character is named after a famous Aristotelian philosopher (Simplicius in Latin, Simplicio in Italian), the name "Simplicio" in Italian also had the connotation of "simpleton". Authors Langford and Stillman Drake asserted that Simplicio was modeled on philosophers Lodovico delle Colombe and Cesare Cremonini. Pope Urban demanded that his own arguments be included in the book, which resulted in Galileo putting them in the mouth of Simplicio. Some months after the book's publication, Pope Urban VIII banned its sale and had its text submitted for examination by a special commission.

== Trial and second judgment, 1633 ==
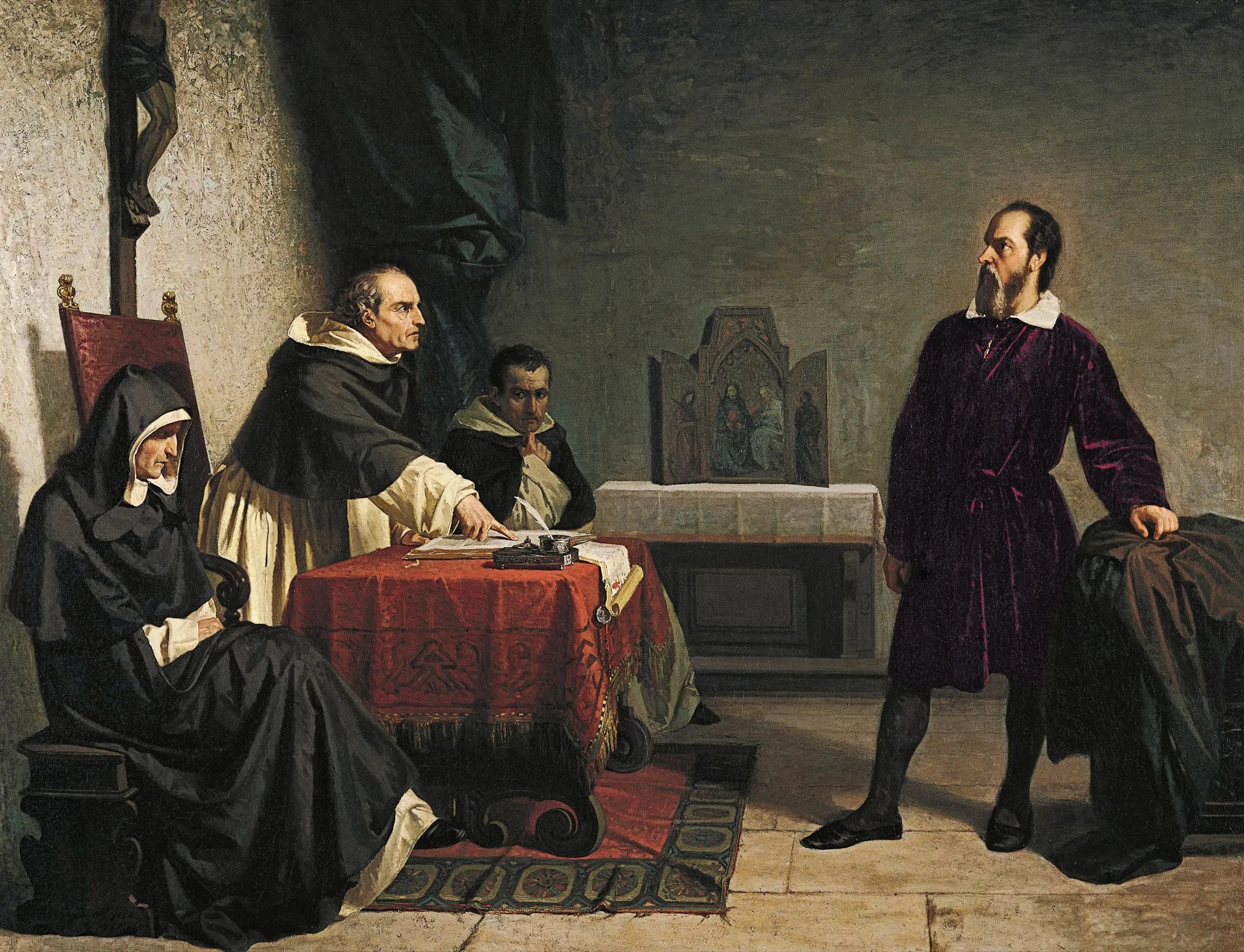
Galileo facing the Roman Inquisition by Cristiano Banti (1857)

"The Sentence of the Inquisition on Galileo"
by Cardinals of the Inquisition
Read by Availle for LibriVox
Audio 00:11:54 (full text)

With the loss of many of his defenders in Rome because of Dialogue Concerning the Two Chief World Systems, in 1633 Galileo was ordered to stand trial on suspicion of heresy "for holding as true the false doctrine taught by some that the sun is the center of the world" against the 1616 condemnation, since "it was decided at the Holy Congregation [...] on 25 Feb 1616 that [...] the Holy Office would give you an injunction to abandon this doctrine, not to teach it to others, not to defend it, and not to treat of it; and that if you did not acquiesce in this injunction, you should be imprisoned".

Galileo was interrogated while threatened with physical torture. A panel of theologians, consisting of Melchior Inchofer, Agostino Oreggi and Zaccaria Pasqualigo, reported on the Dialogue. Their opinions were strongly argued in favour of the view that the Dialogue taught the Copernican theory.

Galileo was found guilty, and the sentence of the Inquisition, issued on 22 June 1633, was in three essential parts:

- Galileo was found "vehemently suspect of heresy", namely of having held the opinions that the Sun lies motionless at the centre of the universe, that the Earth is not at its centre and moves, and that one may hold and defend an opinion as probable after it has been declared contrary to Holy Scripture. He was required to "abjure, curse, and detest" those opinions.
- He was sentenced to formal imprisonment at the pleasure of the Inquisition. On the following day this was commuted to house arrest, which he remained under for the rest of his life.
- His offending Dialogue was banned; and in an action not announced at the trial, publication of any of his works was forbidden, including any he might write in the future.

According to popular legend, after his abjuration Galileo allegedly muttered the rebellious phrase "and yet it moves" (Eppur si muove), but there is no evidence that he actually said this or anything similar. The first account of the legend dates to a century after his death. The phrase "Eppur si muove" does appear, however, in a painting of the 1640s by the Spanish painter Bartolomé Esteban Murillo or an artist of his school. The painting depicts an imprisoned Galileo apparently pointing to a copy of the phrase written on the wall of his dungeon.

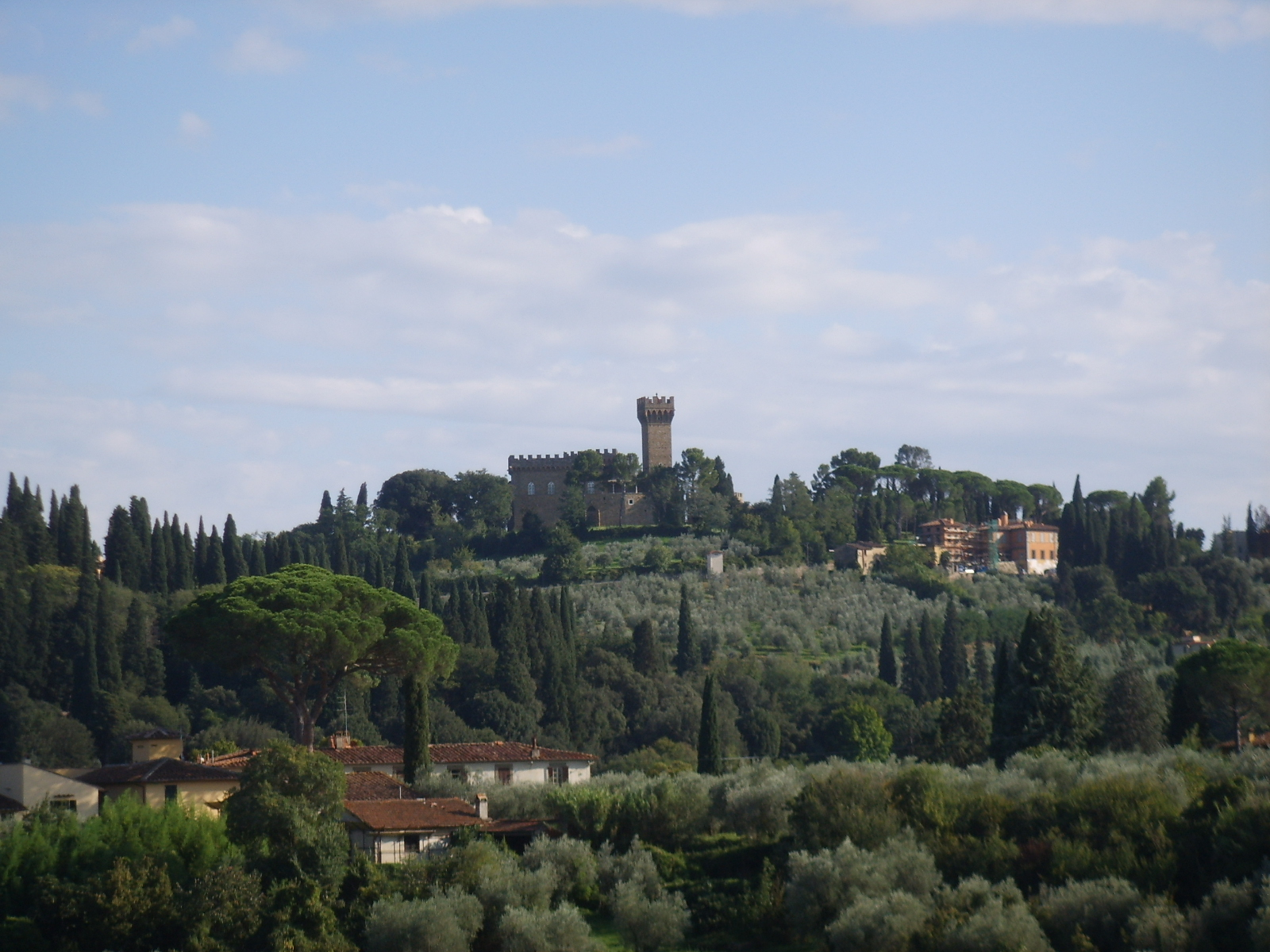
View of the Arcetri area in the hills above Florence, where Galileo spent his life from 1634 onwards under house arrest.

After a period with the friendly Archbishop Piccolomini in Siena, Galileo was allowed to return to his villa at Arcetri near Florence, where he spent the rest of his life under house arrest. He continued his work on mechanics, and in 1638 he published a scientific book in Holland. His standing would remain questioned at every turn. In March 1641, Vincentio Reinieri, a follower and pupil of Galileo, wrote him at Arcetri that an Inquisitor had recently compelled the author of a book printed at Florence to change the words "most distinguished Galileo" to "Galileo, man of noted name".

However, partially in tribute to Galileo, at Arcetri the first academy devoted to the new experimental science, the Accademia del Cimento, was formed, which is where Francesco Redi performed controlled experiments, and many other important advancements were made which would eventually help usher in The Age of Enlightenment.

== Modern views ==
=== Historians and scholars ===
Pope Urban VIII had been a patron to Galileo and had given him permission to publish on the Copernican theory as long as he treated it as a hypothesis, but after the publication in 1632, the patronage broke due to Galileo placing Urban's arguments for God's omnipotence, which Galileo had been required to include, in the mouth of a simpleton character named "Simplicio" in the book; this caused great offense to the Pope. There is some evidence that enemies of Galileo persuaded Urban that Simplicio was intended to be a caricature of him. Modern historians have dismissed it as most unlikely that this had been Galileo's intention.

Dava Sobel argues that during this time, Urban had fallen under the influence of court intrigue and problems of state. His friendship with Galileo began to take second place to his feelings of persecution and fear for his own life. The problem of Galileo was presented to the pope by court insiders and enemies of Galileo, following claims by a Spanish cardinal that Urban was a poor defender of the church. This situation did not bode well for Galileo's defense of his book.

In his 1998 book, Scientific Blunders, Robert Youngson indicates that Galileo struggled for two years against the ecclesiastical censor to publish a book promoting heliocentrism. He claims the book passed only as a result of possible idleness or carelessness on the part of the censor, who was eventually dismissed. On the other hand, Jerome K. Langford and Raymond J. Seeger contend that Pope Urban and the Inquisition gave formal permission to publish the book, Dialogue Concerning the Two Chief World Systems, Ptolemaic & Copernican. They claim Urban personally asked Galileo to give arguments for and against heliocentrism in the book, to include Urban's own arguments, and for Galileo not to advocate heliocentrism.

Some historians emphasize Galileo's confrontation not only with the church, but also with Aristotelian philosophy, either secular or religious.

=== Views on Galileo's scientific arguments ===
While Galileo never claimed that his arguments themselves directly proved heliocentrism to be true, they were significant evidence in its favor. According to Finocchiaro, defenders of the Catholic church's position have sometimes attempted to argue, unsuccessfully, that Galileo was right on the facts but that his scientific arguments were weak or unsupported by evidence of the day; Finocchiaro rejects this view, saying that some of Galileo's key epistemological arguments are accepted fact today. Direct evidence ultimately confirmed the motion of the Earth, with the emergence of Newtonian mechanics in the late 17th century, the observation of the stellar aberration of light by James Bradley in the 18th century, the analysis of orbital motions of binary stars by William Herschel in the 19th century, and the accurate measurement of the stellar parallax in the 19th century. According to Christopher Graney, an Adjunct Scholar at the Vatican Observatory, one of Galileo's observations did not support the Copernican heliocentric view, but was more consistent with Tycho Brahe's hybrid model where the Earth did not move, and everything else circled around it and the Sun.

=== Redondi's theory ===
According to a controversial alternative theory proposed by Pietro Redondi in 1983, the main reason for Galileo's condemnation in 1633 was his attack on the Aristotelian doctrine of matter rather than his defence of Copernicanism. An anonymous denunciation, labeled "G3", discovered by Redondi in the Vatican archives, had argued that the atomism espoused by Galileo in his previous work of 1623, The Assayer, was incompatible with the doctrine of transubstantiation of the Eucharist. At the time, investigation of this complaint was apparently entrusted to a Father Giovanni di Guevara, who was well-disposed towards Galileo, and who cleared The Assayer of any taint of unorthodoxy. A similar attack against The Assayer on doctrinal grounds was penned by Jesuit Orazio Grassi in 1626 under the pseudonym "Sarsi". According to Redondi:

- The Jesuits, who had already linked The Assayer to allegedly heretical atomist ideas, regarded the ideas about matter expressed by Galileo in The Dialogue as further evidence that his atomism was heretically inconsistent with the doctrine of the Eucharist, and protested against it on these grounds.
- Pope Urban VIII, who had been under attack by Spanish cardinals for being too tolerant of heretics, and who had also encouraged Galileo to publish The Dialogue, would have been compromised had his enemies among the Cardinal Inquisitors been given an opening to comment on his support of a publication containing Eucharistic heresies.
- Urban, after banning the book's sale, established a commission to examine The Dialogue, ostensibly for the purpose of determining whether it would be possible to avoid referring the matter to the Inquisition at all, and as a special favor to Galileo's patron, the Grand Duke of Tuscany. Urban's real purpose, though, was to avoid having the accusations of Eucharistic heresy referred to the Inquisition, and he stacked the commission with friendly commissioners who could be relied upon not to mention them in their report. The commission reported against Galileo.

Redondi's hypothesis concerning the hidden motives behind the 1633 trial has been criticized, and mainly rejected, by other Galileo scholars. However, it has been supported recently, as of 2007, by novelist and science writer Michael White.

=== Modern Catholic Church views ===
In 1758 the Catholic Church dropped the general prohibition of books advocating heliocentrism from the Index of Forbidden Books. It did not, however, explicitly rescind the decisions issued by the Inquisition in its judgement of 1633 against Galileo, or lift the prohibition of uncensored versions of Copernicus's De Revolutionibus or Galileo's Dialogue. The issue finally came to a head in 1820 when the Master of the Sacred Palace (the Church's chief censor), Filippo Anfossi, refused to license a book by a Catholic canon, Giuseppe Settele, because it openly treated heliocentrism as a physical fact. Settele appealed to pope Pius VII. After the matter had been reconsidered by the Congregation of the Index and the Holy Office, Anfossi's decision was overturned. Copernicus's De Revolutionibus and Galileo's Dialogue were then subsequently omitted from the next edition of the Index when it appeared in 1835.

In 1979, Pope John Paul II expressed the hope that "theologians, scholars and historians, animated by a spirit of sincere collaboration, will study the Galileo case more deeply and in loyal recognition of wrongs, from whatever side they come". However, the Pontifical Interdisciplinary Study Commission constituted in 1981 to study the case did not reach any definitive result. Because of this, the Pope's 1992 speech that closed the project was vague, and did not fulfill his intentions expressed in 1979.

On February 15, 1990, in a speech delivered at La Sapienza — the University of Rome — Cardinal Ratzinger (later Pope Benedict XVI) cited some current views on the Galileo affair as forming what he called "a symptomatic case that illustrates the extent to which modernity's doubts about itself have grown today in science and technology". As evidence, he presented the views of a few prominent philosophers including Ernst Bloch and Carl Friedrich von Weizsäcker, as well as Paul Feyerabend, whom he quoted as saying:

The Church at the time of Galileo kept much more closely to reason than did Galileo himself, and she took into consideration the ethical and social consequences of Galileo's teaching too. Her verdict against Galileo was rational and just, and the revision of this verdict can be justified only on the grounds of what is politically opportune.

Ratzinger did not directly say whether he agreed or disagreed with Feyerabend's assertions, but did say in this same context that "It would be foolish to construct an impulsive apologetic on the basis of such views."

In 1992, it was reported that the Catholic Church had turned towards vindicating Galileo:

Thanks to his intuition as a brilliant physicist and by relying on different arguments, Galileo, who practically invented the experimental method, understood why only the sun could function as the centre of the world, as it was then known, that is to say, as a planetary system. The error of the theologians of the time, when they maintained the centrality of the Earth, was to think that our understanding of the physical world's structure was, in some way, imposed by the literal sense of Sacred Scripture...

— Pope John Paul II, L'Osservatore Romano N. 44 (1264) – November 4, 1992

In January 2008, students and professors protested the planned visit of Pope Benedict XVI to La Sapienza, stating in a letter that the pope's expressed views on Galileo "offend and humiliate us as scientists who are loyal to reason and as teachers who have dedicated our lives to the advance and dissemination of knowledge". In response the pope canceled his visit. The full text of the speech that would have been given was made available a few days following Pope Benedict's cancelled appearance at the university. La Sapienza's rector, Renato Guarini, and former Italian Prime Minister Romano Prodi opposed the protest and supported the pope's right to speak. Also notable were public counter-statements by La Sapienza professors Giorgio Israel and Bruno Dalla Piccola.

== List of artistic treatments ==
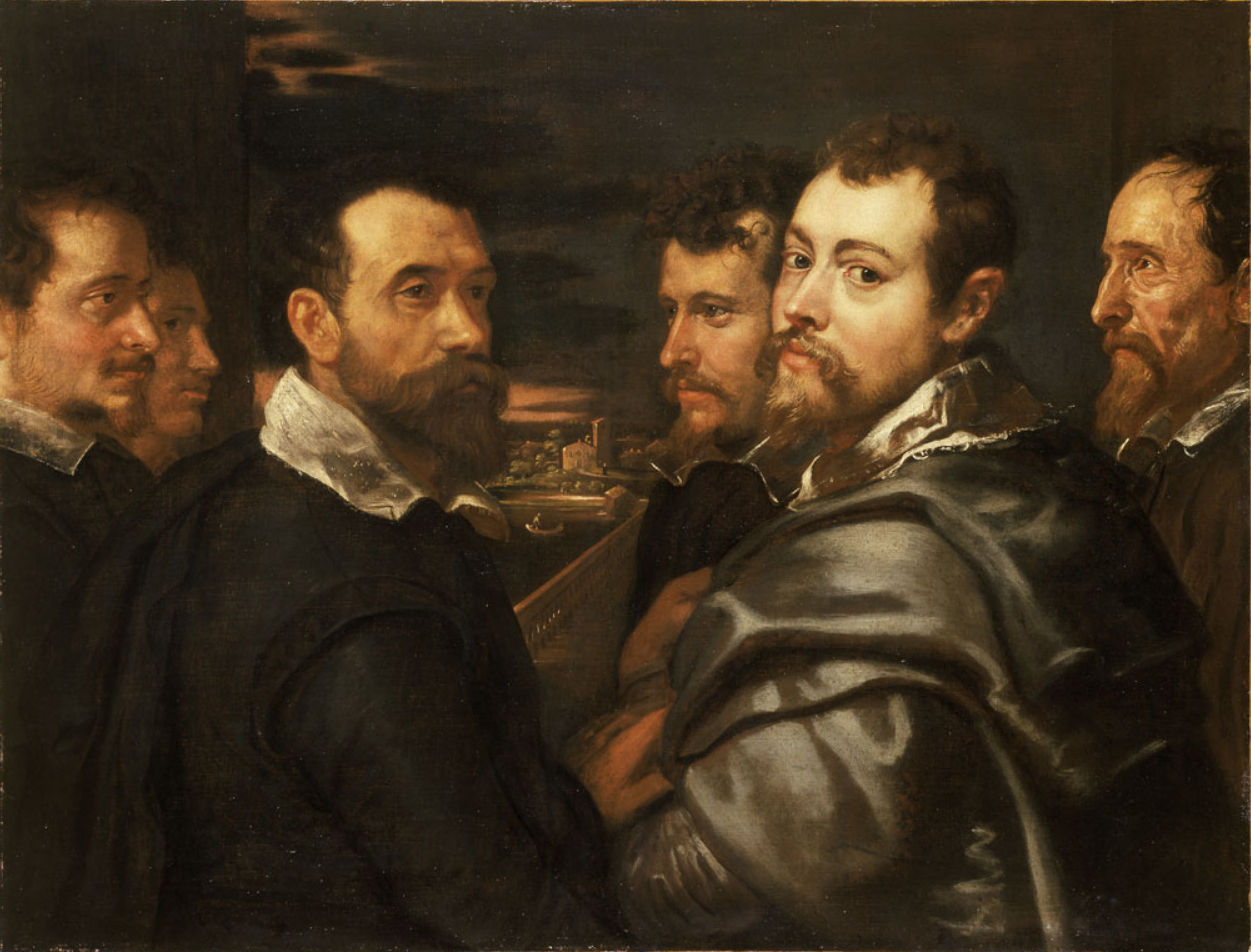
Self-Portrait in a Circle of Friends from Mantua by Rubens, 1602–06. Galilei is the third man on the left

In addition to the large non-fiction literature and the many documentary films about Galileo and the Galileo affair, there have also been several treatments in historical plays and films. The Museo Galileo has posted a listing of several of the plays. A listing centered on the films was presented in a 2010 article by Cristina Olivotto and Antonella Testa.

- Galilée is a French play by François Ponsard first performed in 1867.
- Galileo Galilei is a short Italian silent film by Luigi Maggi that was released in 1909.
- Life of Galileo is a play by the German playwright Bertolt Brecht that exists in several versions, including a 1947 version in English written with Charles Laughton. The play has been called "Brecht's masterpiece" by Michael Billington of The Guardian British newspaper. Joseph Losey, who directed the first productions of the English language version in 1947, made a film based on the play that was released in 1975.
- Lamp at Midnight is a play by Barrie Stavis that was first performed in 1947. An adaptation of the play was televised in 1964; it was directed by George Schaefer. A recording was released as a VHS tape in the 1980s.
- Galileo is a 1968 Italian film written and directed by Liliana Cavani.
- Galileo Galilei is an opera with music by Philip Glass and a libretto by Mary Zimmerman. It was first performed in 2002.

== See also ==
- Aristarchus of Samos
- Giordano Bruno
- Science and the Catholic Church
- Conflict thesis
- Vincenzo Maculani
