= Anfossi =

Anfossi is a surname. Notable people with the surname include:

- Filippo Anfossi (died 1825), Vicar-General of the Dominican Order
- Giuseppe Anfossi (born 1935), Roman Catholic bishop
- Pasquale Anfossi (1727–1797), Italian opera composer
- James Anfossi (born 1992), QBE Underwriter
