= Galileo's ship =

Set of Experiments concerning the Earth's rotation

Galileo's ship refers to two physics experiments, a thought experiment and an actual experiment, by Galileo Galilei, the 16th- and 17th-century physicist and astronomer. The experiments were created to argue for the idea of a rotating Earth, as opposed to a stationary Earth around which the Sun, planets, and stars rotate.

An argument that was used at the time was that, if the Earth were rotating, there would be detectable effects on the trajectories of projectiles or falling bodies.

== Ship's mast experiment ==
In 1616, after Galileo had already become concerned that he was a target of suspicion by the Inquisition, he received a letter from Monsignor Francesco Ingoli listing both scientific and theological arguments against Copernicanism. As part of a lengthy reply in 1624, Galileo described the experiment of dropping a rock from the mast of a smoothly moving ship and observing whether the rock hit at the base of the mast or behind it. Various people had discussed the experiment in theoretical terms, and some claimed to have done it, with conflicting reports as to the result. For example, actual or thought experiments similar to this one had been previously discussed by Jean Buridan, Nicolas Oresme, Nicolaus Cusanus, Clavius and Giordano Bruno.

Galileo told Ingoli (translated by Stillman Drake):

I have been twice as good a philosopher as those others because they, in saying what is the opposite of the effect, have also added the lie of their having seen this by experiment; and I have made the experiment—before which, physical reasoning had persuaded me that the effect must turn out as it indeed does.

Galileo also discussed the experiment in his Dialogue Concerning the Two Chief World Systems (day 2), but without any assertion that it was actually carried out. A similar experiment discussed by Galileo and other authors such as Oresme, Clavius and Bruno involves a projectile being launched straight up from the surface of the earth. A common Aristotelian-Scholastic argument was that if the earth's surface were moving to the east, then in this experiment the projectile would land to the west of the launching point, contrary to observation.

== 1632 thought experiment ==
Galileo's 1632 book Dialogue Concerning the Two Chief World Systems considered (the Second Day) all the common arguments then current against the idea that the Earth moves. One of these is that if the Earth were spinning on its axis, then we would all be moving to the East at thousands of kilometres per hour so a ball dropped straight down from a tower would land West of the tower which would have moved some distance East in the interim. Similarly, the argument went, a cannonball fired to the East would land closer to the cannon than one fired to the West because the cannon moving East would partly catch up with the ball. To counter such arguments the book observes that a person on a uniformly moving ship has no sense of movement and so a cannonball dropped from the top of the mast would fall directly to the foot. To prove the point Galileo's fictional advocate Salviati proposed the experiment described below to show the classical principle of relativity according to which there is no internal observation (i.e. without, as it were, looking out the window) by which one can distinguish between a system moving uniformly from one at rest. Hence, any two systems moving without acceleration are equivalent, and unaccelerated motion is relative. Nearly three centuries later, this notion was applied to the laws of electricity and magnetism (Maxwell's equations) by Albert Einstein. This led to the formulation of the special theory of relativity, a restatement of Galileo's argument with the then-known laws of gravitation and electromagnetism taken into account.

=== The proposal ===
Salviati's experiment goes as follows:

Shut yourself up with some friend in the main cabin below decks on some large ship, and have with you there some flies, butterflies, and other small flying animals. Have a large bowl of water with some fish in it; hang up a bottle that empties drop by drop into a wide vessel beneath it. With the ship standing still, observe carefully how the little animals fly with equal speed to all sides of the cabin. The fish swim indifferently in all directions; the drops fall into the vessel beneath; and, in throwing something to your friend, you need to throw it no more strongly in one direction than another, the distances being equal; jumping with your feet together, you pass equal spaces in every direction. When you have observed all these things carefully (though doubtless when the ship is standing still everything must happen in this way), have the ship proceed with any speed you like, so long as the motion is uniform and not fluctuating this way and that. You will discover not the least change in all the effects named, nor could you tell from any of them whether the ship was moving or standing still. In jumping, you will pass on the floor the same spaces as before, nor will you make larger jumps toward the stern than toward the prow even though the ship is moving quite rapidly, despite the fact that during the time that you are in the air the floor under you will be going in a direction opposite to your jump. In throwing something to your companion, you will need no more force to get it to him whether he is in the direction of the bow or the stern, with yourself situated opposite. The droplets will fall as before into the vessel beneath without dropping toward the stern, although while the drops are in the air the ship runs many spans. The fish in their water will swim toward the front of their bowl with no more effort than toward the back, and will go with equal ease to bait placed anywhere around the edges of the bowl. Finally the butterflies and flies will continue their flights indifferently toward every side, nor will it ever happen that they are concentrated toward the stern, as if tired out from keeping up with the course of the ship, from which they will have been separated during long intervals by keeping themselves in the air. And if smoke is made by burning some incense, it will be seen going up in the form of a little cloud, remaining still and moving no more toward one side than the other. The cause of all these correspondences of effects is the fact that the ship's motion is common to all the things contained in it, and to the air also. That is why I said you should be below decks; for if this took place above in the open air, which would not follow the course of the ship, more or less noticeable differences would be seen in some of the effects noted.

Dialogue Concerning the Two Chief World Systems, translated by Stillman Drake, University of California Press, 1953, pp. 186 - 187 (Second Day).

== Sources ==
- De Angelis, A.; Espirito Santo, C. (2015). "The contribution of Giordano Bruno to the special principle of relativity" (PDF). Journal of Astronomical History and Heritage. 18 (3): 241–248. arXiv:1504.01604.
- Graney, Christopher M. (2012). "Francesco Ingoli's essay to Galileo: Tycho Brahe and science in the Inquisition's condemnation of the Copernican theory". arXiv:1211.4244.
- Stillman Drake, Galileo at Work: His Scientific Biography, p. 117
