= Francesco Ingoli =

Italian Catholic priest, lawyer and professor

- Born: 21 November 1578; Ravenna
- Died: 24 April 1649 (aged 70); Rome
- Occupations: Priest, lawyer and professor of law

Francesco Ingoli (21 November 1578 – 24 April 1649) was an Italian Catholic priest, lawyer and professor of civil and canon law.

== Early life ==
Born in Ravenna, Italy, Ingoli learned a number of languages, including Arabic, and graduated from the University of Padua in civil and canon law in 1601. He entered the order of Theatines and studied astronomy, writing an essay on stars in 1604 and another on comets in 1607. In 1606, he entered the service of Cardinal Bonifazio Caetani (1567-1617), who was the papal legate in Romagna, following him to Rome when the Cardinal was appointed to the Congregation of the Index. In Rome, he attended the Accademia dei Lincei, founded by Federico Cesi. On Caetani's death in 1617, he was taken into the service of Cardinal Orazio Lancelloti.

== Dispute with Galileo ==
His name is particularly linked to the controversy over the Copernican system. He used a combination of theological and scientific arguments to support the astronomical theory of Tycho Brahe over that of Copernicus. Galileo Galilei was one of those who disagreed with him on this matter. Ingoli sent Galileo a letter in January 1616 that listed eighteen scientific and four theological objections to Copernicanism, but suggested that Galileo answer mainly the scientific ones. According to Maurice Finocchiaro, Ingoli had probably been commissioned by the Inquisition to write an expert opinion on the controversy, and this letter provided the "chief direct basis" for the Inquisition's actions against the Copernican system in February and March 1616. It is likely that Ingoli wrote his letter in January 1616; in March, the Congregation of the Index issued its decree against Copernicanism and on 10 May, Ingoli was appointed consultant to the Congregation. A full English translation of Ingoli's essay to Galileo was published in 2015.

The eighteen scientific objections that Ingoli listed were:

- An argument about the parallax of the sun and moon
- An argument from Sacrobosco's Sphere about the appearances of the stars not changing like they would if Earth moved
- An argument from Ptolemy about the Earth being at the center of the universe, because an observer always sees half of the celestial sphere
- An argument from Tycho Brahe that the eccentricities of Venus and Mars were different from what Copernicus assumed
- An argument about the relative densities of the Earth and the sun
- An argument based on the behavior of swirling lumps of material like in a sieve, where the heavier ones accumulate at the center
- An argument from Tycho Brahe on the behavior of falling bodies
- An argument from Tycho Brahe on the flight of cannonballs fired east or west
- An argument from Tycho Brahe on the positions of stars being changed if Earth moved
- An argument from Tycho Brahe on the positions of the celestial pole being changed if Earth moved
- An argument from Tycho Brahe on the day length being changed if Earth moved
- An argument from Tycho Brahe on the motions of comets when opposite the Sun in the sky not comporting with Earth moving
- An argument from Tycho Brahe that the supposed “third motion” of Earth in the Copernican system (the first two being the Earth's daily rotation and yearly orbiting)—that by which the Earth's axis maintains the same orientation in space, parallel to itself at all times, so that it is always pointed at the North Star—is not needed if Earth moved (today we understand that a rotating body naturally maintains its orientation in space gyroscopically, but at the time this was considered an actual third motion.)
- An argument from Tycho Brahe that the supposed “third motion” of Earth in the Copernican system is not possible.
- An argument from Tycho Brahe that the “third motion” of Earth, in combination with the other motions, is too complex.
- An argument from Tycho Brahe and others that heavy bodies are less apt to motion and, since Earth is the heaviest of all known bodies, it should not move
- An argument that bodies have single natural motions
- An argument that Copernicus attributes motion to all bright objects except the Sun, but that he makes the bright Sun motionless and makes the dark Earth moving

The four theological objections Ingoli listed were:

- An argument based on the language of the first chapter of Genesis, describing the sky as a tent and the Sun and Moon both being lights in it
- An argument from Bellarmine on the location of hell being at the center or lowest point of Earth and the universe
- An argument based on the tenth chapter of Joshua, where the Sun is cited as temporarily standing still
- An argument from Bellarmine based on a certain prayer that references a stationary Earth

Galileo did not immediately reply to Ingoli's letter; indeed he did so only after eight years, in an essay which is essentially a first draft of his great treatise Dialogue Concerning the Two Chief World Systems. However Johannes Kepler read Ingoli's letter and published a reply to it in 1618; Ingoli was instrumental in having Kepler's Epitome Astronomiae Copernicanae placed on the Index in February 1618. The Congregation also charged Ingoli with the task of correcting Copernicus’ work, so as to remove those parts which the Church now regarded as unacceptable. On 2 April 1618, he presented his revisions, which were accepted.

== Church career ==
Cardinal Lancellotti died in 1620, and Ingoli became secretary to the family of Cardinal Alessandro Ludovisi and took part in the meetings of the Accademia dei Virtuosi. When Ludovisi was elected Pope Gregory XV, Ingoli's career advanced rapidly. He was named gentleman of the bedchamber and was later placed in attendance with the Pope's nephew, who had been made Archbishop of Bologna. At this time, Ingoli wrote a treatise on parishes, De parochis et eorum officio Libri quatuor (1622). He was called back to Rome and charged by the Pope with the reform of the conclave, which led to the introduction of the secret ballot and the requirement for a two thirds majority for the election of a Pope. He codified the ceremonial procedures for the election of a Pope in Caeremoniale continens ritus electionis Romani pontificis, Gregorii papae XV iussu editum (1622). After this, Gregory XV made him secretary to the Congregation of Ceremonies, in which role he was responsible for decision in June 1630 to refer to Cardinals as “your Eminence”.

In the meantime, Gregory XV also made an Ingoli secretary to the recently established Congregation for the Propagation of the Faith. Ingoli devoted the rest of his life to this role, and was recognised by his contemporaries as the key figure in the consolidating of the new institution. He did much, for example, to ensure that it could operate around the world independently of the Spanish and Portuguese colonial authorities. He also sought to combine the jurisdictional prerogatives of the Congregation with the missionary practices of the individual orders, and left many texts on this subject.

Ingoli's career continued under Gregory XV's successor, Urban VIII. He was also concerned with the Protestant lands of Europe, union with the Orthodox Church, and Christian communities in Islamic countries. He was a determined advocate of the need to re-evangelise these parts of the world, a task which he viewed as a new form of crusade. He also supported the Collegio Urbano, the seminary founded in 1627 by Juan Bautista Vives and linked to the Congregation for the Propagation of the Faith. Here, young men from different parts of the world were trained before going back to their countries as missionaries.

To promote the circulation of books in the languages of countries being evangelised, Ingoli founded the Congregation's famous multilingual printing press. From 1636 he was, for ten years, secretary of the Congregatio super Correctione euchologii Graecorum, which produced an edition of texts for the Melkite Greek Catholic Church. He also founded a Maronite college in his home town of Ravenna, though it only operated for a few years.

Ingoli died in Rome on 24 April 1649. His remains were buried in the common sepulchre of the Theatines in the church of Sant'Andrea della Valle.
