= Giovanni Francesco Sagredo =

Venetian mathematician

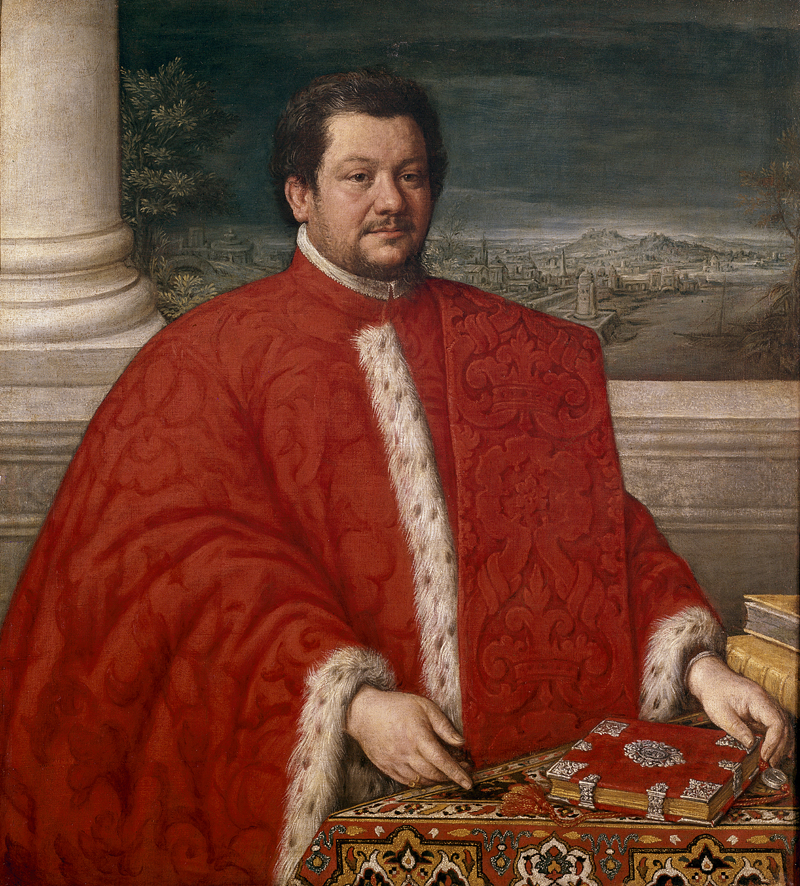
- Born: 19 June 1571; Venice
- Died: 5 March 1620 (aged 48); Venice
- Known for: appearance in Dialogue Concerning the Two Chief World Systems
- Scientific career
- Fields: mathematics physical science

Giovanni Francesco Sagredo (19 June 1571 – 5 March 1620) was a Venetian mathematician and close friend of Galileo. He was also a friend and correspondent of English scientist William Gilbert. He is remembered today mainly because he appears as one of the figures in Galileo's controversial work the Dialogue Concerning the Two Chief World Systems (1632).

== Family background ==
Sagredo was the fourth of six brothers born to Nicolò Sagredo, son of Bernardo of the S. Sofia branch of the family, and his wife Cecilia, daughter of Paolo Tiepolo. The Sagredo family traced its roots back to the fifth century. His grandfather Bernardo was procurator of S. Marco, while his father, who died in 1615, was appointed administrator of Palmanova in 1600, administrator of Cyprus in 1605, procurator of S. Marco in 1611 and reformer of the University of Padua in 1613. The family lived mainly in Palazzo Sagredo, near the Venetian arsenal and the family church of San Francesco della Vigna, but also owned extensive land holdings in the mainland and elsewhere, including a palace in (it) Marocco and beech forests with iron mines near Cadore.

His older brother Bernardo was meant to take on the family's political aspirations, but died in 1603 at the age of 37. The second son, Paolo, disappeared in 1611, while of Stefano, the third son, only a few traces remain. The youngest son Zaccaria had a political career and his son, Nicolò Sagredo became doge.

Giovanni Francesco himself did not marry and had no children. He became a member of the Great Council of Venice in 1596 at the age of 25.

== Early studies and magnetism ==
Almost everything known of Sagredo is based on the letters that he wrote to Galileo Galilei. About a hundred survive, although those written by Galilei to him are lost. In the 1590s Sagredo studied privately with Galileo, who had come to the University of Padua in 1592. In 1599 Sagredo apologized to Galileo for failure to secure a salary increase for him from the university, although he had used his influential family connections to argue his case. In 1602 Galileo drew up a horoscope for Sagredo, which describes him as "blandum, laetum, hilarem, beneficum, pacificum, sociabilem, pronum ad voluptates, Dei amatorem, laborum impatientem" (kind, happy, merry, beneficient, pacific, sociable pleasure-loving, a lover of God, and impatient of troubles).

Sagredo shared an interest in both astronomy and magnetism with Galileo and Paolo Sarpi. By 1600 Sagredo's name was known to Tycho Brahe, who in a letter to Gian Vincenzo Pinelli referred to him as a good contact for the two copies of the star charts that Tycho had offered to the Doge and Senate. Another letter, to William Gilbert describes Sagredo as a "great Magneticall man". One of the hopes that resulted from Gilbert's work was that an all-encompassing mapping of global magnetic declination could be used to solve the problem of calculating longitude. Galilei devised an instrument to measure the magnetic inclination, which Sagredo took with him on his later trip to Syria. Sagredo had a particular contribution to make the advancing the understanding of magnetism - he ran the family mines near Borca di Cadore, from which magnetic iron ore was extracted. Galileo learned how to arm these magnets and the most powerful - known as Rodomonte - was offered for sale to Ferdinando I de' Medici, Grand Duke of Tuscany and to Emperor Rudolf II.

== Opposing the Jesuits ==
In April 1606 escalating disputes between Venice and the Vatican led Pope Paul V to decree the Venetian Interdict and Doge Leonardo Donato to expel the Jesuits from the Republic. Shortly afterwards in August 1606 Sagredo was appointed treasurer of the fortress of Palmanova. The Interdict was revoked in April 1607, Sagredo returned to Venice in May and in November he was appointed consul in Syria.

From March to July 1608 he concentrated his efforts on an entrapment exercise intended to embarrass the Jesuits. His initial target was the Jesuit scholar Antonio Possevino SJ, rector of the Jesuit college of Ferrara. Possevino had published, under various pseudonyms, pamphlets attacking Venice. Sagredo wrote to the college rector (not knowing that Possevino had by then been replaced by Antonio Barisone). Pretending to be a wealthy widow, Cecilia Contarini, Sagredo wrote to the rector asking for advice on how to get around the Venetian laws which prevented her from leaving the Jesuits a large bequest. The ensuing correspondence came to a head in July when a letter arrived advising Barisone that Cecilia Contarini had died leaving the order 5,000 ducats if he would provide formal documentation confirming that her soul had been received in heaven, before finally making clear to Barisone that he had been fooled. Sagredo then circulated the correspondence widely.

== Mission to Syria ==
Despite his intense hostility to the Jesuits, Sagredo used his new base in Aleppo to try and organise a far-ranging scientific endeavour; he wrote to the various Jesuit missions across Asia. He sent them each a magnetic device and asked them make observations of magnetic declination with it. He took his own measurements in Syria, which he sent on to Galileo, but although he received positive initial responses from some of the Jesuit missions they never sent him any observations. That his underlying attitude towards the Jesuits was unchanged is shown by a letter he sent to Sarpi on 30 April 1609 describing how the world was gradually falling prey to them, especially in eastern India and Japan.

As well as his regular consular work and scientific interests, Sagredo was also involved in espionage. As well as serving as Venetian consul, Sagredo was also appointed to be the Persian consul by of Shah Abbas of Persia. In this capacity he was visited by one Xwāje Ṣafar, an Armenian merchant traveling to Venice on behalf of Shah Abbas, who carried with him the correspondence from the Carmelites of Isfahan. This included sensitive military information sent by the viceroy of India to Philip III of Spain. Another file contained details of the negotiations between Abbas and Philip for the drafting of an anti-Ottoman treaty, which would have had an impact on Venetian access to Persian silk. Sagredo took these documents and copied them, earning him a reprimand from the Council of Ten and probably hastening the end of his diplomatic career.

Sagredo returned to Venice via Marseilles, Genoa and Milan. Shah Abbas appointed him 'General Procurator' for Persia in the Venetian Republic in 1611 and in 1613 he began a two-year service as one of the Cinque Savi alla Mercanzia, Venice's Board of Trade.

== Later relationship with Galileo ==
By the time Sagredo returned to Venice Galileo had gone to Florence and the two were never to meet again; their relationship thereafter was entirely by letter. Their correspondence from 1612 to 1620 covers various topics: astronomy, optics and lens production, thermoscopy, cartography, time zones, tide theory, hydrostatics and magnetism, but also dogs, painting, literature, wine and women. Sagredo added a scale to Galileo's thermoscope to enable the quantitative measurement of temperature, and produced more convenient portable thermometers. Sagredo also discussed with Galileo the possibility of a telescope using a mirror (a reflecting telescope).

In June 1619, Galileo and Sagredo exchanged portraits. Sagredo's portrait was by Leandro Bassano. The portrait represents him with his commission from the Doge in front of him on a kilim which was a gift from Abbas I in exchange for the offer of scientific instruments. The portrait, currently in the Ashmolean Museum hung in the rooms of Galileo while he wrote both the Dialogue Concerning the Two Chief World Systems of 1632 and the Two New Sciences of 1638. It is in these works that Galileo immortalised his friend: Sagredo is one of the characters in these works. The Dialogue is even set in a Sagredo palace, although in reality Sagredo left the family palace in 1611. From 1615 to 1618 he lived in Palazzo Donà in S. Stin and, from 1618 to 1620, in the Ca 'Foscari.

Two other portraits of Sagredo have been identified, one in the Zhytomyr Regional Museum in Ukraine and the other in a private collection.

== Death ==
Sagredo died on 5 March 1620 and his last confession was heard by Sarpi. He was buried near his father in the family crypt in S. Francesco della Vigna. His possessions passed to his brother Zaccaria who disposed of all his scientific instruments and his collection of letters has not been found. Sagredo's letters to Gilbert were destroyed in the Great Fire of London.

== Bibliography ==
- Nick Wilding, Galileo's Idol: Gianfrancesco Sagredo and the Politics of Knowledge, University of Chicago Press, 2014, ISBN 022616697X, 9780226166971
