= Raymond Seeger =

Raymond John Seeger (September 20, 1906 – February 14, 1992) was an American physicist.

He was born in Elizabeth, New Jersey and graduated from Rutgers University in 1926 with a B.A. in theoretical physics. He was awarded a doctorate in physics from Yale University in 1929. That year he became an associate professor at the private Presbyterian College in South Carolina. In 1930, he joined the George Washington University (GWU). From 1935, while remaining at GWU, he worked with Edward Teller in applied quantum mechanics. With the start of World War II, in 1942 he began working at the Bureau of Ordnance. He collaborated with John von Neumann and John G. Kirkwood to study shock-wave phenomena and fluid dynamics. He was awarded the Navy Distinguished Public Service Award. In 1943, Seeger served as president of the Philosophical Society of Washington, a scientific organization.

Following the war, he remained a lecturer at GWU until 1947. He then worked at the Naval Ordnance Laboratory in White Oak, Maryland until 1952 as head of the Mechanics Division and head of the Aeroballistic Research Department. He lectured at Johns Hopkins University until 1948, then organized the Fluid Dynamics and Applied Mechanics Institute at the University of Maryland. From 1952 until 1970, he worked at the National Science Foundation where he became deputy assistant director, then retired as a senior staff research associate. He taught at the American University from 1954 until 1972. He continued to work as an author and invited speaker up until his death in Bethesda, Maryland of a heart ailment.

Dr. Seeger published more than 200 papers on topics in physics and mathematics, including quantum mechanics and fluid dynamics. He authored a series of historical articles on notable scientists. He was awarded honorary D.Sc. degrees from Kent State University and the University of Dubuque.
