= Discourse on the Tides =

Essay by Galileo Galilei

"Discourse on the Tides" (Italian: Discorso Sul Flusso E Il Reflusso Del Mare) is an essay written by Galileo Galilei in 1616 as a letter to Alessandro Orsini that attempted to explain the motion of Earth's tides as a consequence of Earth's rotation and revolution around the Sun. The same ideas form an important part of Galileo's Dialogue Concerning the Two Chief World Systems. Galileo's theory was in fact erroneous, as proven by future scientific research and contemporary observations.

== Background ==
Galileo composed "Discourse on the Tides" while in Rome and appealing for papal acceptance of the teaching of Copernican theory. The letter is thus not just an explanation of tidal phenomenon but also a private confirmation and defense of Galileo's ideas on heliocentrism, which are discussed completely in his Dialogue Concerning the Two Chief World Systems. Galileo's ideas for tidal theory may have begun during 1595. While aboard a ferry carrying freshwater to Venice, Galileo noticed that the ship's cargo would undulate in accordance with the rocking of the ship.

Galileo wished to present a convincing argument for heliocentrism. He was aware that all the astronomical arguments in the Dialogue were also consistent with the Tychonic system. Hence, his desire to present his theory of the tides which, he believed, provided clear evidence for the motion of the Earth.

== Summary ==
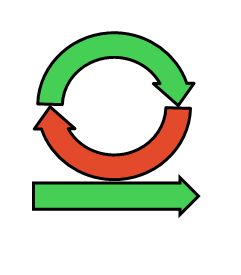
Earth's annual and daily cycles can be thought of in terms of a wheel moving to the right as a point on the wheel revolves clockwise around the wheel's central axis. While moving over the top half of the wheel, the point travels to the right, in the same direction as the wheel itself. The opposite is true while traveling under the bottom half.

The letter compares the ocean's waves to the disturbances in a vase of water, which move for three reasons: the slope of the vase, external forces exerted on the vase-water system, and the possible acceleration of the vase itself. Comparably, the ocean's tides are due to Earth's terrain, wind currents, and circular accelerations. In Galileo's understanding, Earth's rotation and simultaneous orbital revolution dictate that half of the Earth's rotational arc is in concordance with the direction of revolution and the other half is opposed to the direction of revolution. He reasoned that by sometimes matching and sometimes counteracting the motion of orbit, positive and negative acceleration is generated that influences bodies of water to rock back and forth, creating the tides. Though these opposing acceleration cannot be observed, large bodies of water containing points of location far away enough to experience significantly different vectors of acceleration would necessarily contour into waves.

== Criticism ==
Galileo's theory of the tides could not account for one of the two daily occurrences of high tide observed along most coastlines. He countered that the totality of Earth's water system contains an extenuating amount of variables, such as Earth's tilt, uneven surface and coastline, oceanic depth, and inclement winds, that can explain the second high tide. Also, Galileo argued that most natural scientists were examining and basing theories on the tides of the Mediterranean Sea, a microcosm compared to the ocean that may be idiosyncratic. Historical writer E. J. Aiton states that the discourse "is among the least successful of [Galileo's] investigations and completely misrepresents the phenomena it is supposed to explain," and served mainly as an impetus for continued research by Galileo's followers. Aiton reveals that Galileo erred in choosing two different frames of reference: the tide is the motion of water relative to the Earth, but annual revolution is the motion of the Earth, and its water, relative to the Sun. Annual revolution results in a force that accelerates the Earth-water system but does not accelerate the water relative to the Earth, in the same way that an observer standing on Earth's surface does not feel the gravitational attraction of the Sun because the observer and Earth are moving together around the Sun.

== Retrospect ==
The discourse does not include gravitational forces in its theory to explain the Earth's orbit and does not consider the relation between the ocean and gravitational forces, like that of the Moon. Occurring invisibly, gravity was far too mystic for Galileo's consideration. Galileo did end the "Discourse on the Tides" with reservations that his theory may be incorrect and the hope that further scientific investigation will confirm his proposal. Still, his 1632 Dialogue Concerning the Two Chief World Systems omitted gravitational forces and included a reprisal of his tidal theory in its fourth section. See also Voelkel and Naylor.

== See also ==
- Francis Bacon, 1624 work, De Fluxu et Refluxu Maris (Of the Ebb and Flow of the Sea), holds a similar interpretation of tidal theory, likely arrived independently of Galileo
- Johannes Kepler, believed an attractive force between the Moon and ocean could explain the tides
- William Thomson, 1st Baron Kelvin, postulated on tide theory
- Galilean relativity
- Seleucus of Seleucia
