= Maurice Finocchiaro =

American philosopher

- Born: 1942 (age 83–84)
- Awards: Guggenheim Fellowship

Education
- Education: University of California-Berkeley (PhD)

Philosophical work
- Era: 21st-century philosophy
- Region: Western philosophy
- Institutions: University of Nevada, Las Vegas
- Main interests: ethics

Maurice Finocchiaro (born 1942) is an American philosopher and Distinguished Professor Emeritus of Philosophy at the University of Nevada, Las Vegas. He is known for his works on the history of science.

== Books ==
- 1973 History of Science as Explanation. Detroit: Wayne State University Press.
- 1980 Galileo and the Art of Reasoning. (Boston Studies in the Philosophy of Science, vol. 61.) Dordrecht: Reidel (now Springer).
- 1988 Gramsci critico e la critica. Rome: Armando Editore.
- 1988 Gramsci and the History of Dialectical Thought. New York: Cambridge University Press. Pb. edn., 2002.
- 1989 The Galileo Affair. Trans. and ed. by M.A. Finocchiaro. Berkeley: University of California Press. Rpt., “The Notable Trials Library,” New York: Gryphon Editions, 1991.
- 1997 Galileo on the World Systems. Trans. and ed. by M.A. Finocchiaro. Berkeley: University of California Press.
- 1999 Beyond Right and Left: Democratic Elitism in Mosca and Gramsci. New Haven: Yale University Press.
- 2005 Retrying Galileo, 1633–1992. Berkeley: University of California Press. Pb. edn., 2007.
- 2005 Arguments about Arguments. New York: Cambridge University Press.
- 2008 The Essential Galileo. Trans. and ed. by M.A. Finocchiaro. Indianapolis: Hackett.
- 2010 Defending Copernicus and Galileo: Critical Reasoning in the Two Affairs. (Boston Studies in the Philosophy of Science, vol. 280.) Dordrecht: Springer.
- 2013 Meta-argumentation: An Approach to Logic and Argumentation Theory. (Studies in Logic and Argumentation, vol. 42.). London: College Publications.
- 2014 Routledge Guidebook to Galileo's Dialogue. London: Routledge.
- 2014 The Trial of Galileo: Essential Documents. Trans. and ed. M.A. Finocchiaro. Indianapolis: Hackett.
- 2019 On Trial for Reason: Science, Religion, and Culture in the Galileo Affair. Oxford: Oxford University Press.
- 2021 Science, Method, and Argument in Galileo. (Argumentation Library, vol. 40.) Cham, Switzerland: Springer Nature.
- 2023 The Fallacy of Composition. (Studies in Logic and Argumentation, vol. 100.) London: College Publications.
