= Filippo Anfossi =

Filippo Anfossi (died 14 May 1825) was a vicar-general of the Dominicans and Master of the Sacred Palace.

== Biography ==
Anfossi was born in Taggia, Province of Imperia.

He carried on the negotiations with Lamennais regarding the corrections to be made in his "Essai sur l'indifférence" (Paris, 1821–23). He was one of the ultramontanist opponents of the various strands of Gallicanism represented by Scipione de Ricci, Vincento Palmieri, and Guillaume de la Luzerne.

He died in Rome in 1825.

== Works ==
Among Anfossi's published works are:

- Difesa della bolla 'Auctorem fidei' in cui si trattano le maggiori questioni che hanno agitate in questi tempi la chiesa (Rome, 1810 and 1816)
- Motivi per cui il Padre Filippo Anfossi Domenicano a creduto di non potere adorire alle quattro proposizioni gallicane (Rome, 1813)
- L'unione politico-religiosa considerata nei suoi rapporti colla civile societá (Rome, 1822).
