= Discourse on Comets =

1619 pamphlet likely by Galileo Galilei

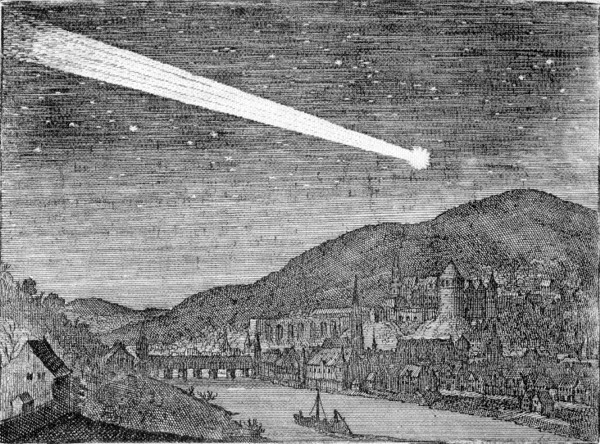
One of the 1618 comets over Heidelberg

The Discourse on Comets (Italian: Discorso delle Comete) was a pamphlet published in 1619 with Mario Guiducci as the named author, though in reality it was mostly the work of Galileo Galilei. In it Galileo conjectured that comets were not physical bodies but atmospheric effects like the aurora borealis.

== Galileo's interest in comets ==
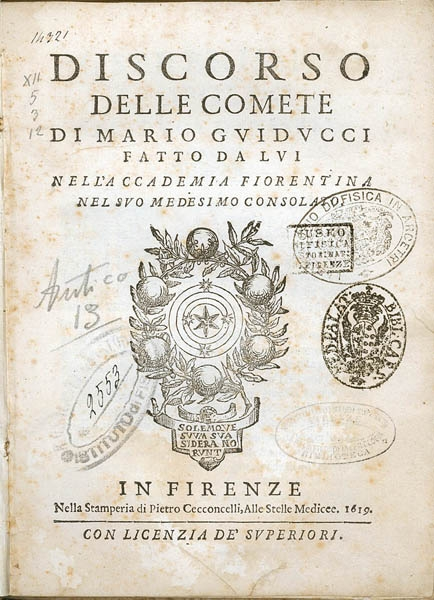
Frontespiece of Discorso delle Comete

Three comets were seen in Europe in 1618. The first appeared in October, the second in mid-November, and the third and brightest at the end of November. After publishing Letters on Sunspots in 1613, Galileo had largely stopped working on telescopic astronomy and published nothing further based on observing and recording astronomical events. In 1616 the heliocentric views of Copernicus were declared formally heretical and Galileo was warned by Cardinal Bellarmine to neither teach nor defend them. After this he was silent on astronomical matters for several years. However Virginio Cesarini wrote to him asking for his views on the 1618 comets, as did Archduke Leopold of Austria and Domenico Bonsi, who wrote to him that the court mathematicians of Louis XIII of France all wanted to know his opinion on the phenomenon.

Galileo had not observed the comets as he was unwell in the autumn of 1618. However he learned that the Collegio Romano had held four lectures on the comets, respectively by a theologian, a mathematician, a philosopher and a rhetorician. The mathematician was Orazio Grassi, a pupil of Maelcote and Grienberger. Grassi argued that the absence of parallax meant that the comets must be very distant from the Earth, and he suggested that they existed beyond the Moon. Soon afterwards the lecture was published in Rome as an anonymous pamphlet entitled "De Tribus Cometis Anni MDCXVIII".

In March 1619, Galileo received a letter from Giovanni Battista Rinuccini alerting him to the fact that some people outside the Jesuit order were claiming that Grassi's lecture on comets provided a definitive proof that Copernicus' ideas were wrong. The evident threat to Copernicus, whom Galileo could no longer defend, prompted him to attack the Tychonic ideas now popular among the Jesuits with particular force.

Galileo received a copy of Grassi's lecture and was very angered by it. The notes he scribbled in the margin of his copy are full of insults - 'pezzo d'asinaccio' ('piece of utter stupidity'), 'bufolaccio' ('buffoon'), 'villan poltrone' ('wicked idiot'), 'balordone' ('bumbling idiot'). He decided to respond to it through his friend Mario Guiducci, who wanted a topic for his planned address to the Accademia Fiorentina. Guiducci read the Discourse on Comets at the Accademia Fiorentina in May 1619 and it was published the next month.

In public, Galileo insisted that Guiducci, and not he, was the author of the Discourse on Comets. Despite Galileo's public protestations, there is no doubt whatever that he was the main author of the Discourse on Comets. The manuscript is largely in Galileo's handwriting, and the sections in Guiducci's hand have been revised and corrected by Galileo.

== Conjecture ==
Grassi responded to the Discourse on Comets as if it were propounding a theory about their origin, but Galileo made clear that he was not doing that. Rather, as in his Letter to the Grand Duchess Christina four years previously, he was insisting that the burden of proof lay with those who had ideas that did not accord with his own. He intended to criticise pedantic thinkers who believed they had easily found a definitive answer to something, disregarding the fact that nature may have many possible ways of producing the same effect. He conceded that he knew very little about comets. His point was to expose those who were convinced that they knew the answers. The Discourse does not attempt to offer clear proofs of Galileo's conjectures, (unlike his Letters on Sunspots or Discourse on Floating Bodies); instead it focuses on arguments that undermine Grassi's contentions, forcing him to examine the phenomenon of comets more thoroughly and produce more substantial evidence for his argument that they are real.

== Arguments in the Discourse ==
The Discourse on Comets, although formally a response to Grassi, was a rebuttal of the arguments made by Tycho Brahe. It advanced the proposition that the absence of parallax observable with comets was due not to their great distance from the Earth, but to the fact that they were not real objects; they were probably atmospheric effects. Galileo (through Guiducci) also argued against Tycho's case for comets having uniform, circular paths. Instead, he maintained, their paths were straight. Throughout, he expressed surprise that mathematicians at the Collegio (where Guiducci had been educated) could have adopted Tycho's positions so uncritically when his arguments were so poor. As well as attacking Grassi, the Discourse also continued an earlier dispute with Christoph Scheiner about sunspots, belittling the illustrations in Scheiner's book as 'badly coloured and poorly drawn.'

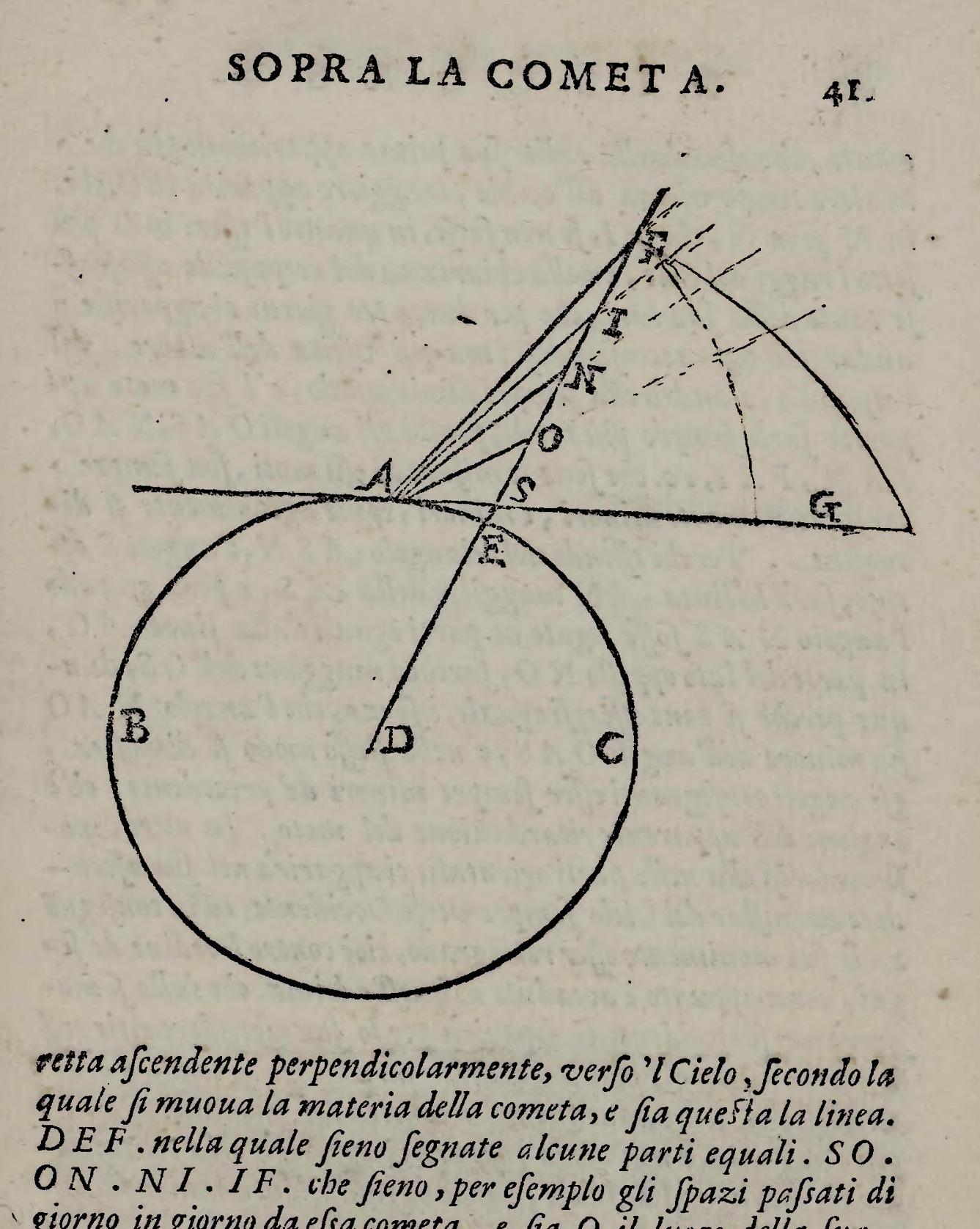
Diagram showing Galileo's conjecture that comets travelled in straight lines

Against classical authority: The Discourse opens with a review of the opinions on comets of Aristotle, Anaxagoras, Democritus, Hippocrates of Chios and Seneca the Younger. By showing how one contradicts the other, and indeed how Aristotle contradicts even himself, Galileo sought "to inculcate a certain skepticism and distrust of dogmatic authority, to encourage observation and mathematical analysis in preference to philosophical speculation, and to emphasise the vast extent of the unknown in comparison with the little men had gained as certain knowledge."

Against the assumption that parallax can measure all visible objects: He cites phenomena such as haloes, rainbows and parhelia, none of which have parallax, and then refers to Pythagoras in suggesting that comets may be an optical illusion caused by light being reflected by a vertically rising column of vapour.

Against misunderstanding of the telescope: Galileo refutes the claim by Grassi that when looking through a telescope one sees 'nearby objects are enlarged very much, and more distant ones less and less in proportion to their greater distance.' He demonstrates at considerable length that this is untrue, and urges the scholars of the Collegio Romano to correct such a serious fault in their understanding.

Against Tycho: The final part of the Discourse is an assault on Tycho and his arguments. First he points out the implausibility of there being a celestial sphere devoted to comets, as they move in different directions and at different speeds. Next he argues from the apparent motion and speed of comets that they are more likely to travel in straight lines than in a circle, as Tycho had suggested.

== Contrasts in Galileo's views ==
In the Discourse on Comets Galileo argued positions different to those in some of his other works.

- Smoothness of heavenly bodies: The standard cosmology of Galileo's time, based on Aristotle's Physics, held that the stars and planets were perfectly smooth. Galileo had upset this view by proving that the Moon had mountains and valleys on its surface, and that the Sun had spots. Nevertheless, in Discourse on Comets Galileo argued that, on the supposition that the heavenly spheres were perfect, smooth and polished, Aristotle must be wrong in suggesting that comets were caused by friction fires in the celestial spheres. Grassi pointed this out in his reply to Galileo, Libra astronomica ac philosophica.
- Planetary rotation and atmospheric phenomena: In Letters on Sunspots Galileo claimed that sunspots were similar to clouds on Earth, carried around by the rotation of the Sun. In contrast, in Discourse on Comets Galileo conjectured that the atmospheric conditions that might produce comets as an optical effect were static and were not carried round by the Earth's motion.
- The origins of comets: Although in the Discourse on Comets Galileo argued that the celestial origin of comets was by no means certain, he had argued the opposite case in August, 1612, in his Second Letter on Sunspots. Here he referred to Tycho's theory of the origin of comets to support his view that mutability in the heavens was not confined to the regions below the Moon: "As if to remove all doubt from our minds, a host of observations come to us to teach us that the comets are generated in the celestial regions." However, by 1632, in his Dialogue Concerning the Two Chief World Systems, Galileo was taking a different view: "As far as the comets are concerned, I, for my part, care little whether they are generated below or above the moon, nor have I ever set much store in Tycho's verbosity."
- Artistotelian thinking: Since 1611, scholars of the Jesuit order had been bound by their General Claudio Acquaviva to defend Aristotle's views on natural philosophy. In many instances (e.g. in Sidereus Nuncius and Letters on Sunspots) Galileo argued against the received Aristotelian model and Jesuits who defended it. However, in the Discourse on Comets Galileo defended a view that posed no challenge to the main tenets of Aristotelian cosmology, while Grassi had in fact departed from the strictly Aristotelian view and embraced Tycho Brahe. Galileo adopted this line of argument to highlight the weaknesses of Tycho's system as a replacement for Ptolemy.

== Continuing dispute ==
The Jesuit order that Grassi belonged to was angry at the expression of Galileo's view in the Discourse on Comets. The pamphlet was a major factor in the alienation of the Jesuits from Galileo, who had previously been broadly supportive of his ideas, even despite his attacks on Christoph Scheiner.

While Guiducci and Galileo were working in the Discourse, a second anonymous Jesuit pamphlet appeared in Milan - Assemblea Celeste Radunata Nuovamente in Parnasso Sopra la Nuova Cometa. This argued for the new model of the universe proposed by Tycho Brahe and against the traditional cosmology of Aristotle. Guiducci and Galileo collaborated on a response to this as well, which set out the arguments for a heliocentric model. The debate continued when, in Perugia later in 1619, Grassi published a reply to the Discourse in La Libra Astronomica ac Philosophica under the pen-name Lotario Sarsi Sigensano. This work dismissed Guiducci as a mere 'copyist' for Galileo, and attacked Galileo's ideas directly. While the Accademia dei Lincei were considering what tone a reply from Galileo ought to take, Guiducci replied directly to Grassi in the Spring of 1620. The reply was formally addressed to another Jesuit, Father Tarquinio Galluzzi, his old rhetoric master. Guiducci countered the various arguments Grassi had put forward against Galileo, describing some of Grassi's experiments as 'full of errors and not without a hint of fraud.' Guiducci concluded with an attempt to reconcile experimental evidence with theological arguments, but firmly asserted the primacy of data gathered through observation. Galileo was very pleased with Guiducci's efforts, proposing him for membership of the Accademia dei Lincei in May 1621 (although he did not actually become a member until 1625).

Galileo's final response in the dispute with Grassi was Il Saggiatore (The Assayer), which he published in 1623. Grassi replied in 1626 with Ratio ponderum librae et simbellae, which focused on doctrinal issues rather than scientific questions. Having defeated Grassi on the points he considered important, Galileo declined to publish anything further on the topic.

== See also ==
- Observational history of comets
- Copernican Revolution
