= Assayer =

Assayer may refer to:

- a person carrying out a metallurgical assay
- The Assayer, a 1623 book by Galileo

== See also ==
- Assay, an investigative (analytic) procedure
