= Sarsi =

Sarsi may refer to:

- Sarsaparilla, a soft drink originally made from Smilax ornata plants
  - Sarsi, the trademarked name of a sarsaparilla-based soft drink brand
- Sarsi First Nation, a First Nation in Canada
- Orazio Grassi, who used "Sarsi" as his pseudonym
