= Book of Nature =

Religious and philosophical concept

The Book of Nature (Lat. liber naturae/liber mundi, Ar. kitāb takwīnī) is a religious and philosophical cosmological metaphor known from Antiquity in various cultures, and prominent in the Latin and Romance literature of the European Middle Ages. The idea of a cosmos formed by letters is already found in the fragments of Heraclitus, where it relates to the Greek concept of logos, in Plato’s Timaeus, and in Lucretius’ De rerum natura.

The metaphor of the Book of Nature straddles the divide between religion and science, viewing nature as a readable text open to knowledge and understanding. Early theologians, such as St. Paul, believed the Book of Nature was a source of God's revelation to humankind. He believed that when read alongside sacred scripture, the "book" and the study of God's creations would lead to a knowledge of God himself. This type of revelation is often referred to as a general revelation. The concept corresponds to the early Greek philosophical concept of logos, which implies that humans, as part of a coherent universe, are capable of understanding the design of the natural world through reason. The phrase liber naturae was famously used by Galileo when writing about how "the book of nature [can become] readable and comprehensible".

== History ==
From the earliest times in known civilizations, events in the natural world were expressed through a collection of stories concerning everyday life. In ancient times, it was believed that the visible, mortal world existed alongside an upper world of spirits and gods acting through nature to create a unified and intersecting moral and natural cosmos. Humans, living in a world that was acted upon by free-acting and conspiring gods of nature, attempted to understand their world and the actions of the divine by observing and correctly interpreting natural phenomena, such as the motion and position of stars and planets. Efforts to analyze and understand divine intentions led mortals to believe that intervention and influence over godly acts were possible—either through religious persuasions, such as prayer and gifts, or through magic, which depended on sorcery and the manipulation of nature to bend the will of the gods. Humans believed they could discover divine intentions through observing or manipulating the natural world. Thus, mankind had a reason to learn more about nature.

Around the sixth century BCE, humanity’s relationship with the deities and nature began to change. Greek philosophers, such as Thales of Miletus, no longer viewed natural phenomena as the result of omnipotent gods. Instead, natural forces resided within nature, an integral part of a created world, and appeared under certain conditions that had little to do with personal deities. The Greeks believed that natural phenomena occurred by "necessity" through intersecting chains of "cause" and "effect". Greek philosophers, however, lacked a new vocabulary to express such abstract concepts as "necessity" or "cause" and consequently used words available to them to refer metaphorically to the new philosophy of nature. As such, they began to conceptualize the natural world in more specific terms that aligned with a unique philosophy that viewed nature as immanent and where natural phenomena occurred by necessity.

The Greek concept of nature, metaphorically expressed through the Book of Nature, gave birth to three philosophical traditions that became the wellspring for natural philosophy and early scientific thinking. Among the three traditions inspired by Plato, Aristotle, and Pythagoras, the Aristotelian corpus became a pervasive force in natural philosophy until it was challenged in early modern times. Natural philosophy, which encompassed a body of work whose purpose was to describe and explain the natural world, derived its foremost authority in the medieval era from Christian interpretations of Aristotle, in which his natural philosophy was viewed as a doctrine intended to explain natural events in terms of readily understood causes.

Aristotle reasoned that knowledge of natural phenomena was derived by abstraction from a sensory awareness of the natural world—in short, knowledge was obtained through sensory experience. A world constructed by abstract ideas alone could not exist. In his reasoning, the structures inherent in nature are revealed through a process of abstraction, which may result in metaphysical principles that can be used to explain various natural phenomena, including their causes and effects. Events with no identifiable reason happen by chance and reside outside the boundaries of natural philosophy. The search for causal explanations became a dominant focus in natural philosophy, whose origins lay in the Book of Nature as conceived by the earliest Greek philosophers. Aristotle’s influence throughout Europe lasted centuries until the Enlightenment warranted fresh investigations of entrenched ideas.

== Christianity and Greek culture ==
The Greeks constructed a view of the natural world in which all references to mythological origins and causes were removed. Greek philosophers inadvertently left the upper world vacant by abandoning ancient ties to free-acting, conspiring gods of nature. The new philosophy of nature made unseen mythological forces irrelevant. While some philosophers drifted toward atheism, others worked within the new philosophy to reconstitute the concept of a divine being. Consequently, the new outlook toward the natural world inspired the belief in one supreme force compatible with the new philosophy—in other words, monotheistic. However, the path from nature to rediscovering a divine being was uncertain. The belief in causality in nature implied an endless, interconnected chain of causation acting upon the natural world. It is presumed, however, that Greek thought denied the existence of a natural world where causality was infinite, which gave rise to the notion of "first cause", upon which the order of other causes must rely.

The first contact between Christianity and Greek culture occurred in Athens in the first century CE. The Christian Scriptures note that within a few years of Christ’s crucifixion, Paul and Silas were debating with Epicureans and Stoics at the Areopagus. Christian theologians viewed the Greeks as a pagan culture whose philosophers were obsessed with the wonders of the material, or the natural world. Observation and explanation of natural phenomena were of little value to the Church. Consequently, early Christian theologians dismissed Greek knowledge as perishable in contrast to actual knowledge derived from sacred Scripture. At the same time, the Church Fathers struggled with questions concerning the natural world and its creation that reflected the concerns of Greek philosophers.

Despite their rejection of pagan thinking, the Church Fathers benefited from Greek dialectic and ontology by inheriting a technical language that could help express solutions to their concerns. As Peter Harrison observes, "In the application of the principles of pagan philosophy to the raw materials of a faith, the content of which was expressed in those documents which were to become the New Testament, we can discern the beginnings of Christian theology." Eventually, Church Fathers would recognize the value of the natural world because it provided a means of deciphering God’s work and acquiring true knowledge of Him. God was believed to have infused the material world with symbolic meaning, which, if understood by man, reveals higher spiritual truths.

What the Church Fathers needed, and did not inherit from the early Greek philosophers, was a method of interpreting the symbolic meanings embedded in the material world. According to Harrison, it was Church Father Origen in the third century who perfected a hermeneutical method that was first developed by the Platonists of the Alexandrian school by which the natural world could be persuaded to give up hidden meanings.

In Christianity, early Church Fathers appeared to use the idea of a book of nature, librum naturae, as part of a two-book theology: "Among the Fathers of the Church, explicit references to the Book of Nature can be found, in St. Basil, St. Gregory of Nyssa, St. Augustine, John Cassian, St. John Chrysostom, Ephrem the Syrian, St. Maximus the Confessor". St Augustine suggested that Nature and the Bible were a two-volume set of books written by God and filled with divine knowledge.

== Rediscovering the natural world ==
By the twelfth century, a renewed study of nature was beginning to emerge along with the recovered works of ancient philosophers, translated from Arabic to original Greek. The writings of Aristotle were seen as being among the most important of the ancient texts and had a remarkable influence among intellectuals. Interest in the material world, in conjunction with the doctrines of Aristotle, elevated sensory experience to new levels of importance. Earlier teachings concerning the relationship between God and man’s knowledge of material things gave way to a world in which knowledge of the material world conveyed the knowledge of God. Whereas scholars and theologians once held a symbolist mentality of the natural world as expressive of spiritual realities, intellectual thinking now regarded nature as a "coherent entity which the senses could systematically investigate. The idea of nature is that of a particular ordering of natural objects, and the study of nature is the systematic investigation of that order".

The idea of order in nature implied a structure to the physical world whereby relationships between objects could be defined. According to Harrison, the twelfth century marked an important time in the Christian era when the world became invested with its patterns of order—patterns based on networks of likeness or similarities among material things, which led to a pre-modern knowledge of nature. It was believed that "While God has made all things that reside in the Book of Nature, certain objects in nature share similar characteristics with other objects, which delineates the sphere of nature and 'establishes the systematizing principles upon which knowledge of the natural world is based'". Nature could now be read like a book.

== The birth of modern science ==
From a single print shop in Mainz, Germany around 1440, the movable type printing-press had spread to no less than around 270 cities in Central, Western and Eastern Europe and had already produced more than 20 million volumes by the end of the 15th century. At the same time, the number of universities had grown to more than 60. By revealing a "New World" unknown to the ancients, the European encounter with the Americas specifically undermined the authority of Claudius Ptolemy, the 2nd-century scholar whose geographic and astronomical models had long been considered infallible.

Tycho Brahe's unprecedentedly accurate astronomical observations in the late 16th century and Galileo Galilei’s early 17th-century telescopic observations combined to turn astronomy into the first modern science. Galileo's observations ended a millennium of pre-modern astronomical orthodoxy. Johannes Kepler used Brahe's data to discover that planets have elliptical, not circular, orbits and develop the laws of planetary motion. Because of Kepler, astronomical phenomena came to be seen as being governed by physical laws, a kind of clockwork.

Ancient texts and doctrines were disputed, knowledge of the natural world was incomplete, interpretation of Christian Scripture was challenged, and Greek philosophy—which helped draft the Book of Nature—and Christian Scripture were viewed as fundamentally opposed.

The Book of Nature was acquiring greater authority for its wisdom and as an unmediated source of natural and divine knowledge. Hands-on investigations, whether of the human body, horticulture, or the stars, were encouraged. As a source of revelation, the Book of Nature remained moored to the Christian faith and occupied a prominent location in Western culture alongside the Bible. Scientific philosophers such as Robert Boyle and Sir Isaac Newton believed that nature could teach humans the breadth of work which God had carried out; Francis Bacon told his readers that they could never be too well-versed in the book of God’s Scripture or the book of God’s nature. The Book of Nature was seen as a way of learning more about God.

== Two books - two worlds? ==
The view of nature as divine revelation and the need for scientific research continued for several centuries. When the word scientist began to replace the term natural philosopher in the 1830s, the most talked-about scientific books in the UK were the eight-volume Bridgewater Treatises. These books, funded by the last Earl of Bridgewater, were written by men appointed by the Royal Society to "explore the Power, Wisdom and Goodness of Gd [sic], as manifested in the Creation".

At that time, nature and the divine were seen to be parallel. However, the concern that the two books would eventually collide was becoming increasingly evident among scholars, natural philosophers, and theologians, who saw the possibility of two separate and incompatible worlds—one determined to possess nature, and the other determined to uphold Christian faith. Reacting to the works of scientists such as Charles Darwin and Alfred Russel Wallace some popular authors began to show that nature may not reveal God, but may show that there is no god at all, but such conclusions did not follow from the theories of natural selection. In Fact, Russel Wallace was a leading scientist and an advocate of spiritualism at the same time, and strongly believed that evolution theories represented an advance in our understanding of the book of nature. Discoveries in paleontology led many to question the Christian scriptures and other divine beliefs. Scientists engaged in physical observation of nature separated themselves from spiritual issues. In contrast, the emerging disciplines of psychology and sociology led others to see religious belief as a temporary step in a society’s development rather than a central and essential element. By 1841, Auguste Comte proposed that empirical observation was the final culmination of human society.

== See also ==
- The Assayer
- Dogmatics – Theology of theoretical official truths
- Natural theology – Theology reliant on rational and empirical arguments
- Nature
- Science and the Catholic Church

== Bibliography ==
- Dear, Peter (2009). Revolutionizing the Sciences: European Knowledge and Its Ambitions, 1500-1700. Princeton: Princeton University Press. ISBN 978-0-691-14206-7.
- Evernden, Lorne Leslie Neil. The Social Creation of Nature. Baltimore, MD: Johns Hopkins University Press, 1992.
- Harrison, Peter (26 July 2001). The Bible, Protestantism, and the Rise of Natural Science. New York: Cambridge University Press. ISBN 978-0-521-00096-3.
- Pedersen, Olaf (1992). The Book of Nature. Notre Dame, IN: Notre Dame Press. ISBN 0-268-00690-3.
- Wootton, David (2015). The Invention of Science: A New History of the Scientific Revolution. New York: Harper, an imprint of HarperCollins Publishers. ISBN 978-0-06-175952-9.
