= Observational history of comets =

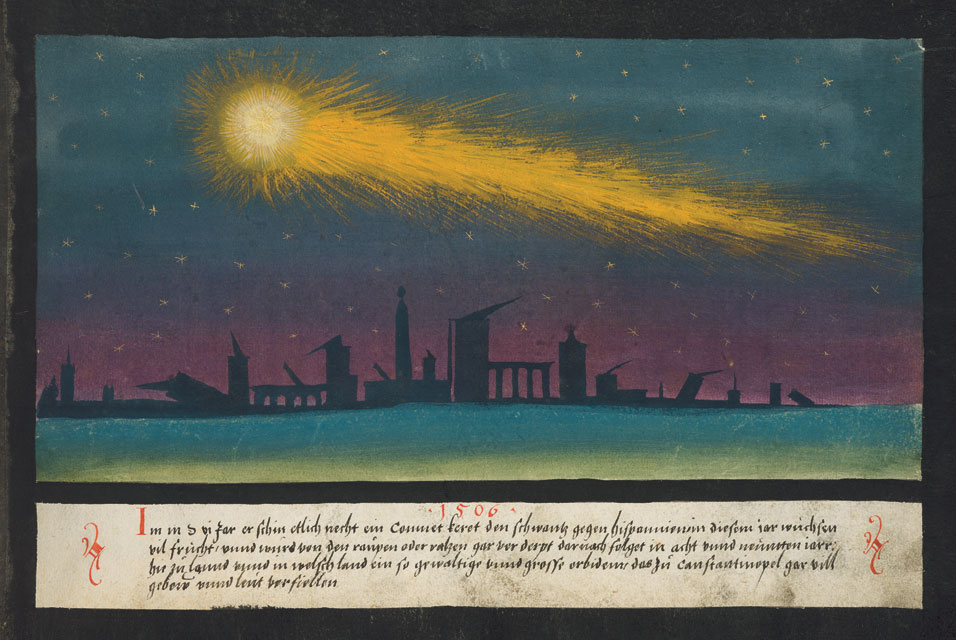
The Book of Miracles (Augsburg, 16th century).

Comets have been observed by humanity for thousands of years, but only in the past few centuries have they been studied as astronomical phenomena. Before modern times, great comets caused worldwide fear, considered bad omens foreboding disaster and turmoil; for example, the 1066 passage of Halley's Comet depicted as heralding the Norman conquest of England. As the science of astronomy developed planetary theories, understanding the nature and composition of comets became a challenging mystery and a large area of study.

Halley's Comet, reappearing every 75–76 years, was pivotal to the study of comets and their orbits. Thinkers such as Immanuel Kant in the eighteenth century hypothesized about the physical composition of comets. Today, comets are well understood as "dirty snowballs" in eccentric orbits around the Sun, but they continue to be objects of scientific and popular fascination. In 1994, comet Shoemaker–Levy crashed spectacularly into the atmosphere of Jupiter. In 1997, members of the Heaven's Gate cult committed mass suicide, inspired by the passage of comet Hale-Bopp. Since 1985, a total of 8 comets have been visited by spacecraft.

== Early observations and thought ==
From ancient sources, such as Chinese oracle bones, it is known that their appearances have been noticed by humans for millennia. Little is known of what people thought about comets before Aristotle, who observed his eponymous comet, and most of what is known comes secondhand. From cuneiform astronomical tablets, and works by Aristotle, Diodorus Siculus, Seneca, and one attributed to Plutarch but now thought to be Aetius, it is observed that ancient philosophers divided themselves into two main camps. Some believed comets to be astronomical entities; others affirmed their meteorological nature.

Meteors and comets were of great importance to the native inhabitants of Mexico. Meteors were alternatively viewed as arrows of stellar gods, as their cigar butts, and even as their excrement. The arrows could hit animals or people and were feared when walking at night. Comets were conceived as smoking stars and as bad omens, e.g., announcing the death of a ruler.

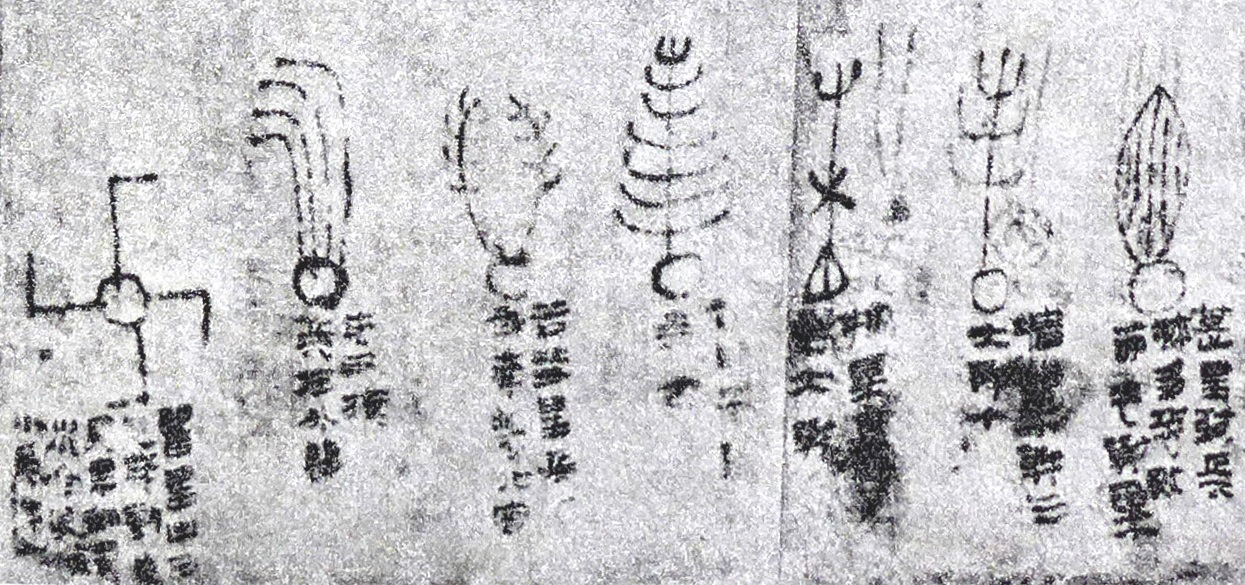
Detail of astrology manuscript, ink on silk, 2nd century BC, Han dynasty, unearthed from Mawangdui tomb. The page gives descriptions and illustrations of seven comets, from a total of 29 found in the document.

Ancient Chinese records of comet apparitions have been particularly useful to modern astronomers. They are accurate, extensive, and consistent over three millennia. The past orbits of many comets have been calculated entirely from these records and most notably they were used in connection with Halley's comet. Ancient Chinese made important decisions by looking at celestial omens and comets were an important omen, always disastrous. Under the theory of Wu Xing (also known as five elements), comets were thought to signify an imbalance of yin and yang. Chinese emperors employed observers specifically to watch for them. Some important decisions were made as a result. For instance, Emperor Ruizong of Tang abdicated after a comet appearance in 712 CE. Comets were thought to have military significance. For example, the breakup of a comet on 35 CE was interpreted as portending the destruction of Gongsun Shu by Wu Han.

According to Norse Mythology, comets were actually a part of the Giant Ymir's skull. According to the tale, Odin and his brothers slew Ymir after the Battle of Ragnarok and set about constructing the world (Earth) from his corpse. They fashioned the oceans from his blood, the soil from his skin and muscles, vegetation from his hair, clouds from his brains, and the sky from his skull. Four dwarves, corresponding to the four cardinal directions, held Ymir's skull above the Earth. Following this tale, comets in the sky, as believed by the Norse, were flakes of Ymir's skull falling from the sky and then disintegrating.

The only place in the world where a comet is worshiped is in a temple at Rome. It was a comet that the divine Augustus judged as particularly propitious to himself since it appeared at the beginning of his rule during the games which he gave in honor of Venus Genetrix not long after his father's death when he was a member of the religious body that Caesar had founded.

In the first book of his Meteorology, Aristotle propounded the view of comets that would hold sway in Western thought for nearly two thousand years. He rejected the ideas of several earlier philosophers that comets were planets, or at least a phenomenon related to the planets, on the grounds that while the planets confined their motion to the circle of the Zodiac, comets could appear in any part of the sky. Instead, he described comets as a phenomenon of the upper atmosphere, where hot, dry exhalations gathered and occasionally burst into flame. Aristotle held this mechanism responsible for not only comets, but also meteors, the aurora borealis, and even the Milky Way. Aristotle introduced his theory of how comets came to be by first stating that the world was divided into two parts: the earth and the heavens. The upper parts of the Earth, below the Moon, contained phenomena such as the Milky Way and comets. These phenomena were created from a mixture of four elements that were naturally found on Earth: water, earth, fire, and air. He theorized that the Earth was the center of the universe, which was surrounded by various other planets and stars. The universe or better known as the heavens filled the void above the terrestrial atmosphere with a fifth element called "Aether". Aristotle believed that comets were shooting stars that evolved into something much different. This proved that comets came from a combination of the elements found on Earth. Comets could not have come from the heavens as the heavens are never-changing but comets are ever-changing as they move through space. Aristotle believed that comets were shooting stars that evolved into something much different. Aristotle considered comets as a specific form of shooting stars that can occur under a very delicate combination of physical conditions. It is not known how many comet appearances Aristotle and his contemporaries witnessed or how much quantitative observational information they had about the trajectory, motion and duration of comets.

Anaxagoras and Democritus' theory deviated from Aristotle's, as they believed comets were only after-images or shadows from planetary eclipses. Pythagorean claimed comets were planets that revolved around the Sun for a longer period of time across the edge of the Sun. Hippocrates of Chios and Aeschylus had a similar belief to that of Pythagorean, as they both believe comets were planets that had special properties. Chios and Aeschylus theorized that comets are planets that have an immaterial tail produced by the atmosphere. Aristotle's theory over the creation and properties of a comet was prevalent up until the 1600s. Many philosophers and astrologers came up with their own theories to try and explain the phenomena that is a comet but only two were of relevance. Aristotle's theory still prevailed, along with Seneca's.

Seneca believed comets came from the celestial region of the universe. He firmly opposed Aristotle's theory that comets were formed from the element of fire by stating the comets fire would grow if it ever entered the lower depths of the atmosphere. Seneca recognized the flaws in his theory as he understood that accurately and consistently observing a comet had a high level of difficulty. Seneca the Younger, in his Natural Questions, observed that comets moved regularly through the sky and were undisturbed by the wind, behavior more typical of celestial than atmospheric phenomena. While he conceded that the other planets do not appear outside the Zodiac, he saw no reason that a planet-like object could not move through any part of the sky.

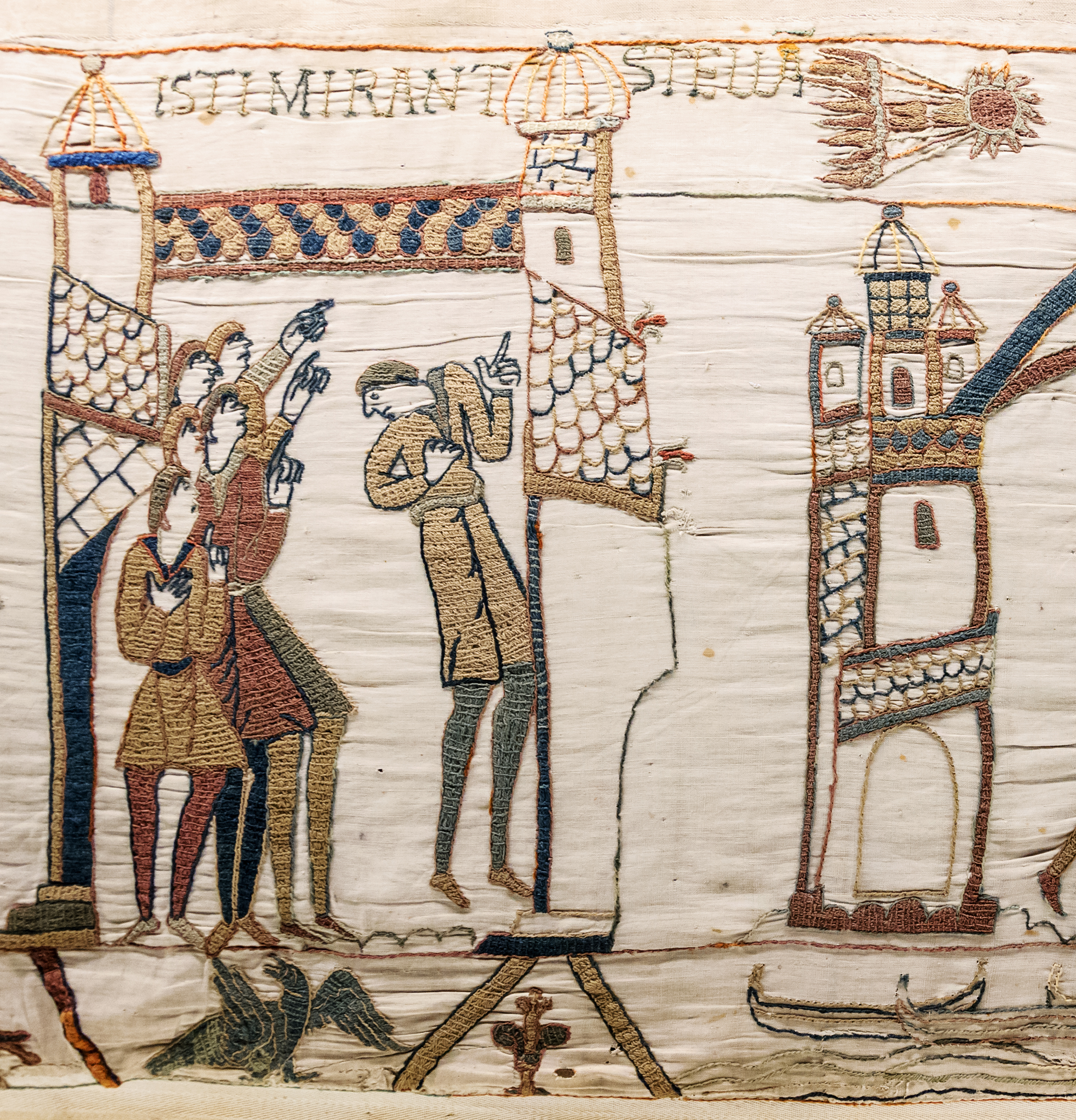
Halley's Comet appeared in 1066, prior to the Battle of Hastings, and is depicted in the Bayeux Tapestry.

Until the sixteenth century, comets were usually considered bad omens of deaths of kings or noble men, or coming catastrophes, or even interpreted as attacks by heavenly beings against terrestrial inhabitants. The earliest known picture of a comet is that of Halley's Comet depicted as a terrifying omen on the Bayeux Tapestry, which recorded the Norman conquest of England in 1066 CE. Another illustration published in the Nuremberg Chronicle in 1493 has been claimed to depict the comet's 684 CE apparition, but the same woodblock is used in that chronicle for other comets from the 11th century, and there is no evidence that the image is anything but a generic image of a comet, created for the 1493 edition.

== Pre-Modern views on comets ==
In the Islamicate empire, Nasir al-Din al-Tusi used the phenomena of comets to refute Ptolemy's claim that a stationary Earth can be determined through observation. Ali Qushji, in his Concerning the Supposed Dependence of Astronomy upon Philosophy, rejected Aristotelian physics and completely separated natural philosophy from astronomy. After observing comets, Ali Qushji concluded, on the basis of empirical evidence rather than speculative philosophy, that the moving Earth theory is just as likely to be true as the stationary Earth theory and that it is not possible to empirically deduce which theory is true.

In the mid 1500s, a mathematician by the name of Jean Pena opposed Aristotle's theory of comets by studying the physics and math behind the phenomena. He deducted that comets maintained its visual appearance, regardless of the view and angle in which is observed near the horizon of the Sun. Pena argued that the orientation and appearance of the comets were due to the physics of space. Pena claimed comets were at a farther distance from the Earth than the Moon as it would pass the Moon at a greater speed, due to the effects of Earth's gravity. The tail of a comet points toward the direction of the Sun as it is moving through space based on the laws of refraction. The comet's tail is composed of an air-like element that is transparent as it is seen in space but only when it is faced away from the Sun. The visibility of the tail is explained by solar rays reflecting off of the tail. The Laws of Refraction allows the human eye to visually see the tail of a comet in space at a different position than it truly is because of the reflection from the Sun.

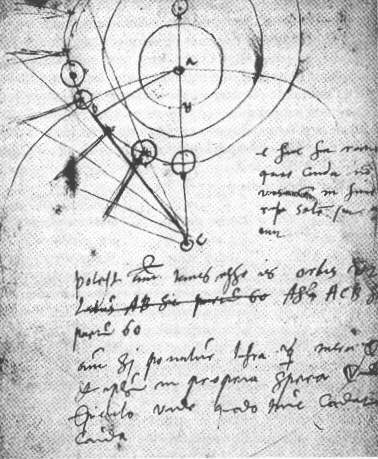
Tycho Brahe's sketching of his observations of the Great Comet of 1577 in his notebook.

A great comet appeared in the sky above Europe on 1577 AD. Tycho Brahe decided to try and estimate the distance to this comet by measuring its parallax, the effect whereby the position or direction of an object appears to differ when viewed from different positions. He proposed that comets (like planets) return to their respective positions in the sky, meaning that comets too follow an elliptic path around the Sun. On the other-hand, astronomers like Johannes Kepler believe that these celestial bodies proceed on a linear course throughout the cosmos. The parallax of closer object in the sky is greater than the parallax for distant objects in the sky. After observing the Great Comet of 1577, Tycho Brahe realized that the position of a comet in the sky stayed the same regardless of where in Europe you measure it from. The difference in position of the comet should have been larger if the comet was located within the orbit of Earth. From Brahe's calculations, within the precision of the measurements, the comet must be at least four times more distant than from the Earth to the Moon. Sketches found in one of Brahe's notebooks seem to indicate that the comet may have traveled close to Venus. Not only that, Tycho observed the comet travel by Mercury, Mars, and the sun as well. After this discovery, Tycho Brahe created a new model of the Universe – a hybrid between the classical geocentric model and the heliocentric one that had been proposed in 1543 by Polish astronomer Nicolaus Copernicus – to add comets. Brahe made thousands of very precise measurements of the comet's path, and these findings contributed to Johannes Kepler's theorizing of the laws of planetary motion and realization that the planets moved in elliptical orbits.

== Orbital studies ==
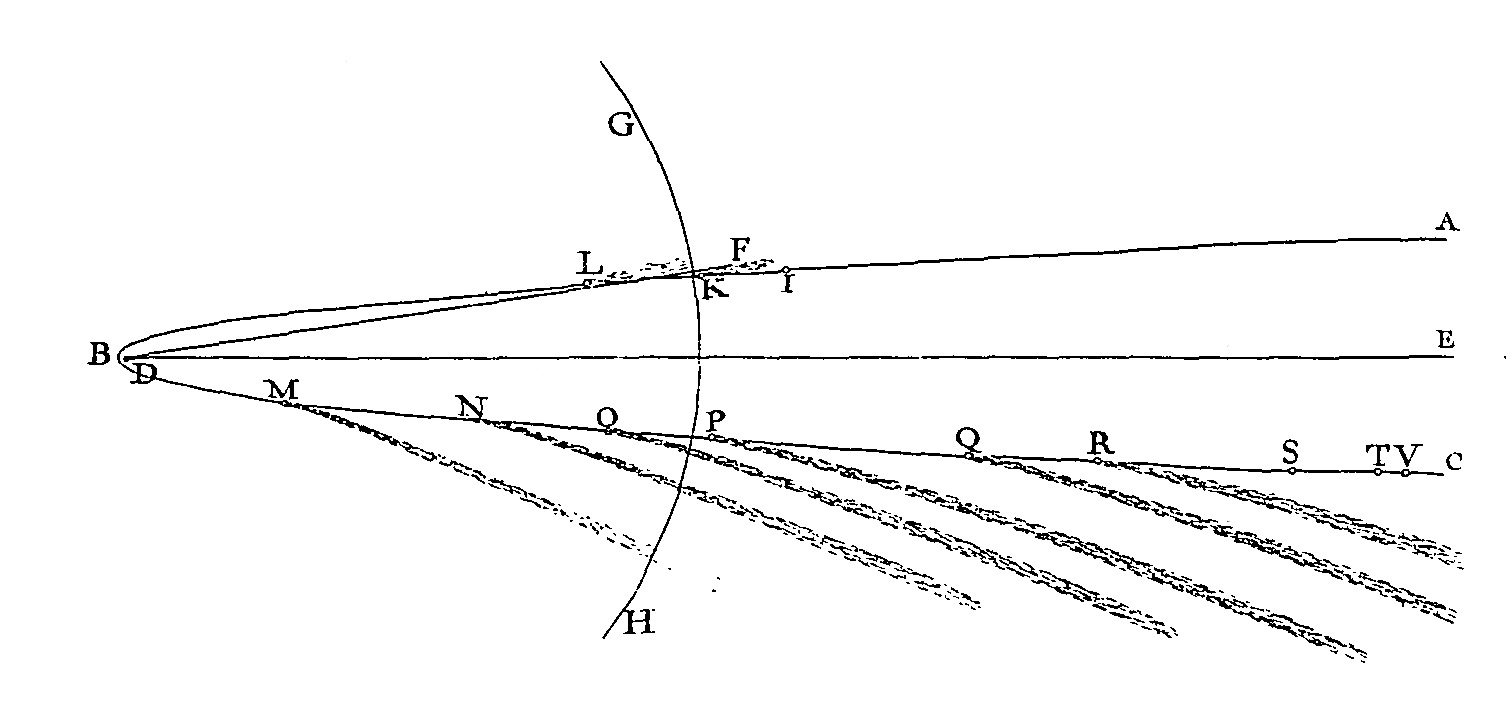
The orbit of the comet of 1680, fit to a parabola, as shown in Isaac Newton's Principia

Though comets had now been demonstrated to be in space, the question of how they moved would be debated for most of the next century. Even after Johannes Kepler had determined in 1609 that the planets moved about the Sun in elliptical orbits, he was reluctant to believe that the laws that governed the motions of the planets should also influence the motion of other bodies; he believed that comets travel among the planets along straight lines, and it required Edmond Halley to prove that their orbits are in fact curved. Galileo Galilei, although a staunch Copernicanist, rejected Tycho's parallax measurements and his Discourse on Comets held to the Aristotelian notion of comets moving on straight lines through the upper atmosphere.

The matter was resolved by the bright comet that was discovered by Gottfried Kirch on November 14, 1680. Astronomers throughout Europe tracked its position for several months. In 1681, the Saxon pastor Georg Samuel Doerfel set forth his proofs that comets are heavenly bodies moving in parabolas of which the Sun is the focus. Then Isaac Newton, in his Principia Mathematica of 1687, proved that an object moving under the influence of his inverse-square law of universal gravitation must trace out an orbit shaped like one of the conic sections, and he demonstrated how to fit a comet's path through the sky to a parabolic orbit, using the comet of 1680 as an example. Evidently understanding that comets lose matter as they approach the Sun, Bernard de Fontenelle wrote in 1686: "We think ourselves unhappy when a comet appears, but the misfortune is the comet's."

The theories that astrologers and philosophers before the 1600s came up with were still prevalent by the time Isaac Newton began studying mathematics and physics. John Flamsteed, one of the leading astronomer in the Newtonian age revised Descartes' theory to prove that comets were planets. The motion of the comets came from magnetic and vortex particle forces, and the tails of the comets were physical not just a reflection. Flamsteed's revision contradicted Aristotle and many other comet theories as they believed that comets came from Earth and had their own special properties from the rest of the phenomena in space. However, Newton rejected Flamsteed's revision of this theory. Newton theorized that the properties of these phenomena were not due to magnetic forces because magnetic forces lose their effect with heat. Newton finalized his study of comets when he revised Flamsteed's theory that a comet's motion was due to a force acting upon it. Isaac Newton believed that the motion of comets came from an attracting force, which came from either the natural effects of the Sun or a different phenomenon. Newton's discovery over the comets motion propelled the overall study of comets as a part of the heavens.

Halley at first agreed with the longtime consensus that each comet was a different entity making a single visit to the Solar System. In 1705, he applied Newton's method to 23 cometary apparitions that had occurred between 1337 and 1698. Halley noted that three of these, the comets of 1531, 1607, and 1682, had very similar orbital elements, and he was further able to account for the slight differences in their orbits in terms of gravitational perturbation by Jupiter and Saturn. Confident that these three apparitions had been three appearances of the same comet, he predicted that it would appear again in 1758–59. (Earlier, Robert Hooke had identified the comet of 1664 with that of 1618, while Giovanni Domenico Cassini had suspected the identity of the comets of 1577, 1665, and 1680. Both were incorrect.) Halley's predicted return date was later refined by a team of three French mathematicians: Alexis Clairaut, Joseph Lalande, and Nicole-Reine Lepaute, who predicted the date of the comet's 1759 perihelion to within one month's accuracy. Halley died before the comet's return; when it returned as predicted, it became known as Halley's Comet (with the latter-day designation of 1P/Halley). The comet next appears in 2061.

In the 19th century, the Astronomical Observatory of Padova, was an epicenter in the observational study of comets. Led by Giovanni Santini (1787–1877) and followed by Giuseppe Lorenzoni (1843–1914), this observatory was devoted to classical astronomy, mainly to the new comets and planets orbit calculation, with the goal of compiling of a catalog of almost ten thousand stars and comets. Situated in the Northern portion of Italy, observations from this observatory were key in establishing important geodetic, geographic, and astronomical calculations, such as the difference of longitude between Milan and Padua as well as Padua to Fiume. In addition to these geographic observations, correspondence within the observatory, particularly between Santini and another astronomer at the observatory Giuseppe Toaldo, shows the importance of comet and planetary orbital observations to not only the Observatory as a whole, but also to the rest of Europe and the scientific world.

Among the comets with short enough periods to have been observed several times in the historical record, Halley's Comet is unique in that it is consistently bright enough to be visible to the naked eye while passing through the inner Solar System. Since the confirmation of the periodicity of Halley's Comet, other periodic comets have been discovered through the use of the telescope. The second comet found to have a periodic orbit was Encke's Comet (with the official designation of 2P/Encke). During the period 1819–1821 the German mathematician and physicist Johann Franz Encke computed the orbits for a series of comets that had been observed in 1786, 1795, 1805, and 1818, and he concluded that they were the same comet, and successfully predicted its return in 1822. By 1900, seventeen comets had been observed through more than one passage through their perihelions, and then recognized as being periodic comets. As of November 2021, 432 comets have achieved this distinction, although several of these have disintegrated or been lost.

By 1900 comets were categorized as "periodic", with elliptical orbits, or "non-periodic", one-time with parabolic or hyperbolic orbits. Astronomers believed that planets captured non-periodic comets into elliptical orbits; each planet had a "family" of comets that it captured, with Jupiter's the largest. In 1907 A. O. Leuschner proposed that many non-periodic comets would have elliptical orbits if studied longer, making most comets permanent parts of the Solar System, even those with orbital periods of thousands of years. This implied a large group of comets outside the orbit of Neptune, the Oort cloud.

== Physical characteristics ==
"From his huge vapouring train perhaps to shake
Reviving moisture on the numerous orbs,
Thro' which his long ellipsis winds; perhaps
To lend new fuel to declining suns,
To light up worlds, and feed th' ethereal fire."

James Thomson The Seasons (1730; 1748)

Isaac Newton described comets as compact and durable solid bodies moving in oblique orbit and their tails as thin streams of vapor emitted by their nuclei, ignited or heated by the Sun. Newton suspected that comets were the origin of the life-supporting component of air. Newton also believed that the vapors given off by comets might replenish the planets' supplies of water (which was gradually being converted into soil by the growth and decay of plants) and the Sun's supply of fuel.

As early as the 18th century, some scientists had made correct hypotheses as to comets' physical composition. In 1755, Immanuel Kant hypothesized that comets are composed of some volatile substance, whose vaporization gives rise to their brilliant displays near perihelion. In 1836, the German mathematician Friedrich Wilhelm Bessel, after observing streams of vapor during the appearance of Halley's Comet in 1835, proposed that the jet forces of evaporating material could be great enough to significantly alter a comet's orbit, and he argued that the non-gravitational movements of Comet resulted from this phenomenon.

However, another comet-related discovery overshadowed these ideas for nearly a century. Over the period 1864–1866 the Italian astronomer Giovanni Schiaparelli computed the orbit of the Perseid meteors, and based on orbital similarities, correctly hypothesized that the Perseids were fragments of Comet Swift–Tuttle. The link between comets and meteor showers was dramatically underscored when in 1872, a major meteor shower occurred from the orbit of Comet Biela, which had been observed to split into two pieces during its 1846 apparition, and was never seen again after 1852. A "gravel bank" model of comet structure arose, according to which comets consist of loose piles of small rocky objects, coated with an icy layer.

By the middle of the twentieth century, this model suffered from a number of shortcomings: in particular, it failed to explain how a body that contained only a little ice could continue to put on a brilliant display of evaporating vapor after several perihelion passages. In 1950, Fred Lawrence Whipple proposed that rather than being rocky objects containing some ice, comets were icy objects containing some dust and rock. This "dirty snowball" model soon became accepted and appeared to be supported by the observations of an armada of spacecraft (including the European Space Agency's Giotto probe and the Soviet Union's Vega 1 and Vega 2) that flew through the coma of Halley's Comet in 1986, photographed the nucleus, and observed jets of evaporating material.

According to research, large comets with a radius of over 10 kilometers could contain liquid water at their cores by the decay of radioactive isotopes of aluminum or iron.

Observations presently indicate that the nuclei of comets are ice dust conglomerates with masses ~ 10^{13} to 10^{19} g, radii ~ few km, average rotation periods ~ 15 hr and tensile strength ~ 10^{5} dyne cm^{−2}. The latter indicates that cometary nuclei are very fragile entities. All observations support the basic concept of a comet nucleus based on Whipple's icy conglomerate model of H_{2}O ice plus a mixture of other ices and dust.

The initial structure of a comet nucleus is most probably a fine-grained porous material composed of a mixture of ices, predominantly H_{2}O, and dust. The water ice is presumably amorphous and includes occluded gases. This structure is bound to undergo significant changes during the long residence of the nucleus in the Oort cloud or the Kuiper belt, due to internal radiogenic heating. The evolved structure of a comet nucleus is thus far from homogeneous: the porosity and average pore size change with depth and the composition is likely to become stratified. Such changes occur mainly as a result of gas flow through the porous medium: different volatiles – released by sublimation or crystallization of the amorphous ice – refreeze at different depths, at appropriate temperatures, and the gas pressure that builds up in the interior is capable of breaking the fragile structure and alter the pore sizes and porosity. These processes have been modelled and followed numerically. However, many simplifying assumptions are necessary and the results are found to depend on a large number of uncertain parameters. Thus porous comet nuclei may emerge from the long-term evolution far from the sun in three different configurations, depending on the thermal conductivity, porous structure, radius, etc.: a) preserving their pristine structure throughout; b) almost completely crystallized (except for a relatively thin outer layer) and considerably depleted of volatiles other than water and c) having a crystallized core, layers including large fractions of other ices and an outer layer of unaltered pristine material. Liquid cores may be obtained if the porosity is very low. The extent of such cores and the length of time during which they remain liquid are again determined by initial conditions, as well as by physical properties of the ice. If, in addition to the very low porosity, the effective conductivity is low, it seems possible to have both an extended liquid core, for a considerable period of time, and an outer layer of significant thickness that has retained its original pristine structure.

== The Rosetta Mission ==
The Rosetta Mission. The Rosetta spacecraft with the comet that it is chasing.

The Rosetta mission was launched in early 2004 by the Guiana Space Centre in French Guiana. The mission for the Rosetta spacecraft was to follow a comet and collect data on it. Being the first spacecraft to orbit a comet, the goal was to understand the physical and chemical compositions of many aspects of the comet, observe the comets nucleus, as well as make connections about the Solar System. The comet that the mission followed is called 67P/Churyumov–Gerasimenko and was discovered by Klim Ivanovich Churyumov and Svetlana Ivanova Gerasimenko. After making contact with the comet, many observations were made that changed what we knew about comets. A very surprising discovery is that as the comet travels, it releases an increasing amount of water vapor. That water is also different from that on Earth, being heavier because it contains more deuterium. This comet was also found to be made from a cold space cloud, which is why it is made of dust and ice loosely compacted. To investigate the nucleus of the comet, the Rosetta spacecraft passed radio waves through the comet. This experiment showed that the head of the comet was very porous. A computer model shows that there are many pits all over the comet that are very wide and deep. The composition of the comet led scientists to be able to infer the comet's formation. They believe it was a rather gentle formation as the comet is so loosely compacted. The mission lasted for over a decade and was a very important mission for the study of comets.

== Spacecraft targets ==
Since 1995, a total of 8 comets have been visited by spacecraft. These were the comets Halley, Borrelly, Giacobini–Zinner, Tempel 1, Wild 2, Hartley 2, Grigg–Skjellerup and Churyumov–Gerasimenko, generating a host of new findings. In addition, the spacecraft Ulysses unexpectedly traversed the tail of Comet McNaught.

== Sources ==
- "Comets in Newtonian Physics". A History of Physical Theories of Comets, from Aristotle to Whipple. Archimedes. Vol. 19. Springer Netherlands. 2008. pp. 89–124. doi:10.1007/978-1-4020-8323-5_4. ISBN 978-1-4020-8322-8. ISSN 1385-0180.
- Barker, Peter, and Bernard R. Goldstein. "Theological Foundations of Kepler's Astronomy". Osiris, vol. 16, 2001, pp. 88–113. Retrieved 2019-11-26.
- Christianson, J. R., and Tycho Brahe. "Tycho Brahe's German Treatise on the Comet of 1577: A Study in Science and Politics". Isis, vol. 70, no. 1, 1979, pp. 110–140. Retrieved 2019-11-26.
- Kennedy, E. S. "Comets in Islamic Astronomy and Astrology". Journal of Near Eastern Studies, vol. 16, no. 1, 1957, pp. 44–51. Retrieved 2019-11-26.
- McCartney, Eugene S. "Clouds, Rainbows, Weather Galls, Comets, and Earthquakes as Weather Prophets in Greek and Latin Writers (Concluded)". The Classical Weekly, vol. 23, no. 2, 1929, pp. 11–15. Retrieved 2019-11-26.
- Needham, J. "Astronomy in Ancient and Medieval China". Philosophical Transactions of the Royal Society of London. Series A, Mathematical and Physical Sciences, vol. 276, no. 1257, 1974, pp. 67–82. Retrieved 2019-11-26.
- Pamdey, Nnadini. "Caesar's Comet, the Julian Star, and the Invention of Augustus". Transactions of the American Philological Association (1974–2014), vol. 143, no. 2, 2013, pp. 405–449. Retrieved 2019-11-26.
- Ramsey, John T. "Mithridates, the Banner of Ch'ih-Yu, and the Comet Coin". Harvard Studies in Classical Philology, vol. 99, 1999, pp. 197–253. Retrieved 2019-11-26.
- Robert A. Gurval. "Caesar's Comet: The Politics and Poetics of an Augustan Myth". Memoirs of the American Academy in Rome, vol. 42, 1997, pp. 39–71. Retrieved 2019-11-26.
- Roberta J. M. Olson. "...And They Saw Stars: Renaissance Representations of Comets and Pretelescopic Astronomy". Art Journal, vol. 44, no. 3, 1984, pp. 216–224. Retrieved 2019-11-26.
- Ron Cowen. "Comets: Mudballs of the Solar System?" Science News, vol. 141, no. 11, 1992, pp. 170–171. Retrieved 2019-11-26.
- Sagan, Carl; Druyan, Ann (1997). Comet. Headline. ISBN 9780747276647.
- Van Der Sluijs, Marinus Anthony. "Hll: Lord of the Sickle". Journal of Near Eastern Studies, vol. 68, no. 4, 2009, pp. 269–282. Retrieved 2019-11-26.
