= Odo Van Maelcote =

Jesuit Priest, scientist, and mathematician from the Spanish Netherlands

Odo van Maelcote, (also known as Malcotius)(b. Brussels 28 July 1572, d. Rome 14 May 1615) was a Jesuit priest, scientist and mathematician from the Spanish Netherlands (present day Belgium).

== Biography ==
Odo van Maelcote, lord of Kessel, was the oldest son of Johannes Van Maelcote, a doctor of both civil and canon law at the University of Louvain, First Counsellor and Vice-Chancellor in the chancellery of Brabant, and his wife, Marie de Viron. He entered the noviciate with the Jesuits at Tournai on 12 February 1590 and studied at the University of Douai.

In 1607, he published in Brussels a small tract on the equinoctial astrolabe that he had designed and manufactured, which involved two conjoined hemispheres. The device was useful to missionary ventures around the world, as it could be used in both northern and southern latitudes. This made his name known among scientists, and when he sent an astrolabe as a gift to Christopher Clavius in Rome, Clavius responded by inviting him to Rome to teach mathematics and Hebrew at the Roman College in 1608, where he soon became assistant to Christoph Grienberger.

In 1610, Cardinal Bellarmine asked four Jesuits, Grienberger, Clavius, it:Paolo Lembo and Maelcote, for their opinion on the new phenomena discovered by Galileo using his telescope. Reporting on behalf of his colleagues, Maelcote advised that they agreed with most of Galileo's findings, although they were uncertain whether Saturn consisted of three bodies as Galileo stated (the fact that Saturn had rings was not evident from the first telescopes); rather, it seemed to be elliptical in shape. Maelcote also reported that Clavius did not believe that the Moon had mountains and craters as appeared through the telescope; its surface was smooth, and the uneven distribution of some substance within the Moon merely created the illusion of an uneven surface.

Galileo was invited to a banquet at the Roman College, on 18 May 1611, during which Maelcote pronounced a long formal eulogy, praising Galileo's work. Nevertheless, they were called to order by the Superior General of the Jesuits, Claudio Acquaviva, and obliged to uphold the traditional Aristotelian view of the universe, which Galileo's discoveries overturned.

In 1611, Van Maelcote was back in Brussels, and from 1612 to 1614, he began a correspondence with Kepler, particularly seeking his views on sunspots, following the publication of observations and commentary from both Christoph Scheiner and Galileo. Kepler agreed with Maelcote and Galileo that sunspots did not behave like satellites.

He returned to Rome, where he worked at the observatory of the Roman College until his death. Among his pupils was Orazio Grassi.
