= Orazio Grassi =

Italian Jesuit priest, architect and scientist (1583–1654)

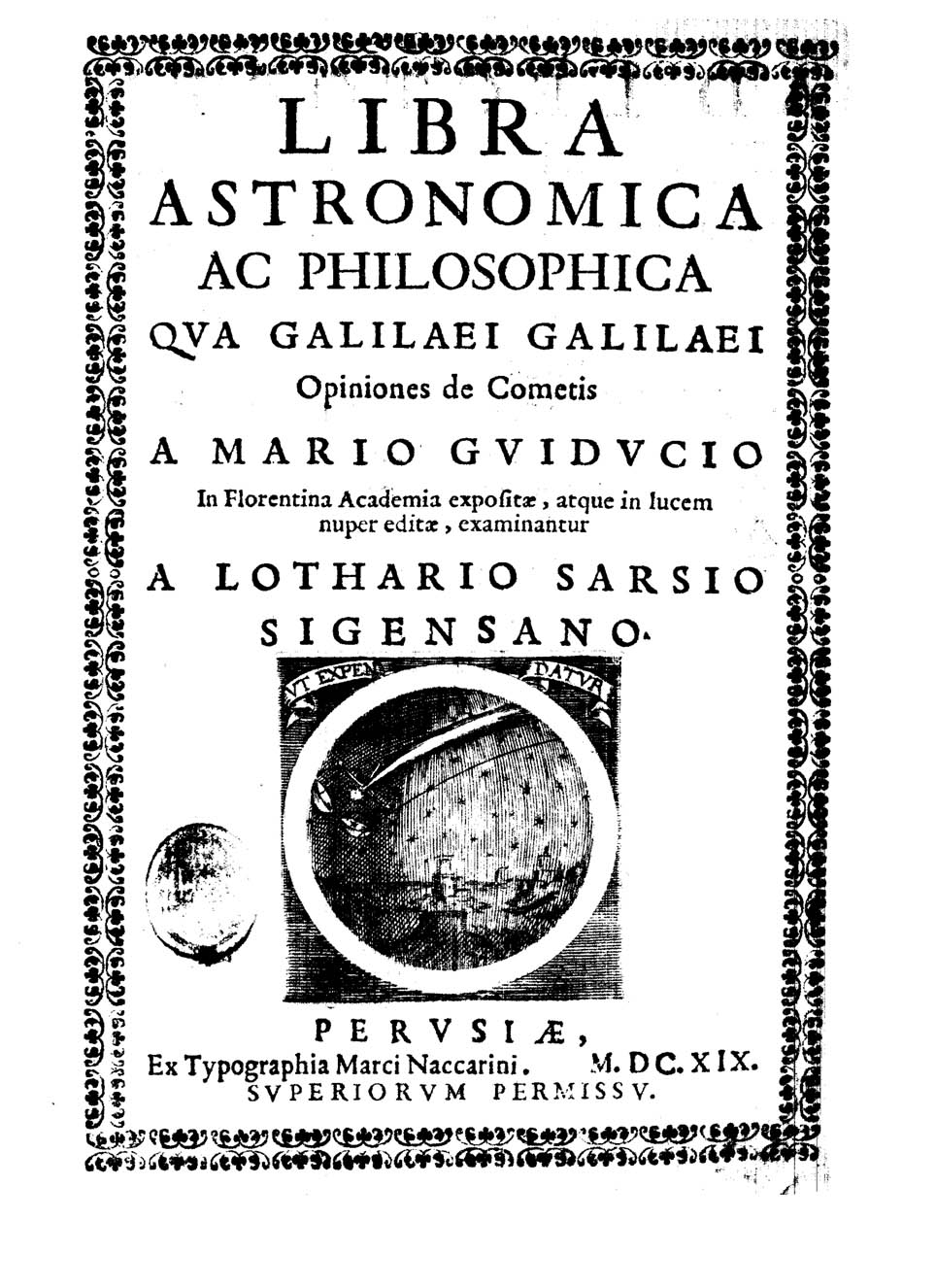
Libra astronomica ac philosophica

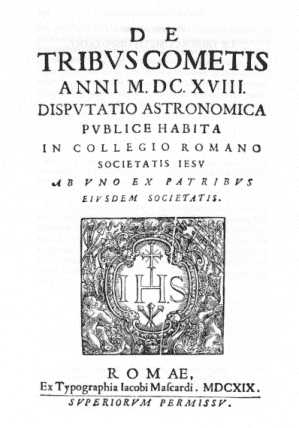
De Tribus Cometis

Orazio Grassi SJ (b. Savona 1 May 1583 – d. Rome 23 July 1654) was an Italian Jesuit priest, who is best noted as a mathematician, astronomer and architect. He was one of the authors in controversy with Galileo Galilei on the nature of comets. His writings against Galileo were published under the pseudonym Sarsi.

== Early life ==
Grassi was born in Savona, then part of the Republic of Genoa. He entered the novitiate of the Society of Jesus at the Church of Sant'Andrea al Quirinale in Rome in 1600. Following the profession of his first religious vows in 1603, he began studies at the Roman College, where he took courses in philosophy, theology and mathematics. Among his professors were the noted German Jesuit mathematicians, Christopher Clavius, Christoph Grienberger and Odo Van Maelcote. He continued his studies there until 1610.

In 1614, Grassi was assigned to serve as Jesuit college in Genoa in the capacity of assistant Master of novices. He served in that position for two years before being named to the faculty of the Roman College as a professor of mathematics. During that period, his research focused on pure mathematics, as well as on optics and architecture. In 1617, he published a series of lectures he had given on the eye, De iride disputatio optica, under the pseudonym of Galeazzo Mariscotto, as well as the Tractatus tres de sphera, de horologis ac de optica. He pronounced solemn vows in the Society in 1618, at which time he received Holy Orders as a priest, following which he was given the chair in mathematics. He held this position until 1628.

== Dispute with Galileo ==
Early in 1619, under the title "De Tribus Cometis Anni MDCXVIII", Grassi published a lecture he had given to the Collegio Romano about three comets which had appeared in the autumn of 1618. He argued that the absence of parallax meant that the comets must be very distant from the Earth, and he suggested that they existed beyond the Moon.

Galileo received a copy of Grassi's lecture and was very angered by it. The notes he scribbled in the margin of his copy are full of insults—pezzo d'asinaccio ('piece of utter stupidity'), bufolaccio ('buffoon'), villan poltrone ('wicked idiot'), balordone ('bumbling idiot'). Galileo responded with his Discourse on Comets, which was a rebuttal of many of the arguments, advanced by Grassi, but originally made by Tycho Brahe. It suggested that the absence of parallax with comets was due not to their great distance from the Earth, but to their probably being atmospheric effects. Galileo also maintained their paths were straight, rather than circular, as Brahe and Grassi believed. As well as attacking Grassi, the Discourse also continued an earlier dispute with another Jesuit, Christoph Scheiner about sunspots.

Grassi replied in turn with his treatise Libra astronomica ac philosophica published under the pseudonym of Lotario Sarsi Sigensano (an anagram of Horatius Grassius Salonensis, his name in Latin). In this Grassi both noted how close the ideas in Galileo's Discourse were to those advanced by Gerolamo Cardano and Bernardino Telesio (which the Church regarded as dangerous) and set out scientific arguments and experimental test results to show that comets were definitely not optical illusions. Grassi's work provoked another furious reaction from Galileo in the shape of his 1623 work Il Saggiatore, in which he was savagely dismissive of Grassi's efforts.

It has been suggested that Grassi was the author of an anonymous complaint to the Inquisition soon after Il Saggiatore appeared, asserting that the book advanced an atomic theory of matter, and that this conflicted with the Catholic doctrine of the Eucharist, because atomism would make transubstantiation impossible. Although most scholars do not agree that Grassi was its author, it is noteworthy that his second response to Il Saggiatore, the Ratio ponderum librae et simbellae (1626), contains many of the same arguments as the anonymous complaint. While Libra had focused mainly on astronomical issues, Ratio focused on doctrinal issues.

... unlike The Assayer, which had recourse to the lethal polemical weapons of satire and the new philosophy, the Ratio used those no-less-lethal weapons of doctrinal and dialectical retort based on religious and philosophical orthodoxy.

No further arguments were published on either side by Grassi or Galileo on these matters after this.

== Other scientific interests ==
During the course of his career, Grassi wrote several other scientific and technical works, including one on spheres, clocks and optics (Tractatus tres de sphera, de horologis ac de optica (1617)); another on optics (De iride disputatio optica a Galeatio Mariscotto publice habita in Collegio Romano S.I. (1617)) and one on sundials in the works of Vitruvius (In primum librum de architectura M. Vitruvii et in nonum eiusdem De horologiorum solarium descriptione duo brevissimi tractati (1624)). In the later period of his life, when he was in Genoa, he produced a number of other works, subsequently lost, including one treatise on the physics of light and another on architecture, unfinished at the time of his death. In 1644, he was also conducting experiments on atmospheric pressure based on the work of Evangelista Torricelli using a tube filled with mercury. These experiments were significant in demonstrating the inadequacy of Aristotelian physics.

He continued to serve as Professor of Mathematics and Vice-Rector of the Roman College until 1633, when the Order transferred him to the Jesuit college in his home territory of Genoa. There he served not in a teaching capacity but as confessor, but although he no longer held a senior academic post, he continued to review and advise on a number of the Order's scientific projects. The Republic of Genoa also consulted him on naval engineering, including one for an 'unsinkable' ship. After a second period in Rome, he served once again as confessor at the college in Genoa, and then as vice-rector, between 1651 and 1653.

== Architectural projects ==
Grassi was involved in advising on a number of building projects for the Jesuit order. His interest in architecture appears to date from 1616 when he began teaching mathematics, and at the same time assumed the title consiliarius aedificiorum (building consultant), for all the construction projects of the Jesuit order. He appears to have fulfilled this responsibility sporadically between 1616 and 1628. After this, he devoted a great deal of his time to architecture, although many of his schemes were destined never to be built. Among these was his first known design, dating from 1620 and 1621 at the church of S. Ignazio near the Jesuit college of Ajaccio.

In 1624, he made a trip to Sezze to check on progress in the construction of the local college and the church of Ss. Pietro e Paolo, begun in 1601 to a design by Father Giovanni De Rosis. Grassi made a number of alterations and additions to this project. In 1626, the rector of the college in Siena invited him to take charge of the transformation of the church of San Vigilio. It was his only completely realised design, and it was a major influence on Jesuit architecture, combining excellent functional use of space with sober decoration.

At the end of 1626 he was called to Rome to help with the building works on the church of Sant'Ignazio and in 1627 he was made prefect of its construction. In 1632 he was called to Terni to assist with the building of the church of S. Lucia; and soon after, with the college of Montepulciano and a church in Viterbo.

His architectural work was reduced after his move to Genoa in 1633, but in 1634, he began to work on the project for a new Jesuit college in the city, which was the cause of much contention seen between the Order and the Balbi family, which owned the land they wanted to build on. When he later became vice-rector of the college, he resumed work on the project, which had made little progress in the intervening years and was only eventually finished in 1664.

In the Spring of 1645, Grassi visited Rome, where he carried out an inspection of the works on Sant'Ignazio and wrote a highly critical report, resulting in a general review of the construction that had already been completed under the direction of Antonio Sasso. Grassi was responsible for work relating to the elevation of the facade, and proposed a novel interior dome scheme to solve other problems arising from earlier departures from the original design. This was never built however, and instead installed a trompe-l'œil dome painted by Andrea Pozzo.

== Works ==
- Libra astronomica ac philosophica (in Italian). Perugia: Marco Naccarini. 1619.
- Ratio ponderum librae et simbellae (in Latin). Napoli: Matteo Nucci. 1627.
