= Christoph Grienberger =

Austrian astronomer (1561–1636)

Christoph (Christophorus) Grienberger (also variously spelled Gruemberger, Bamberga, Bamberger, Banbergiera, Gamberger, Ghambergier, Granberger, Panberger) (2 July 1561 – 11 March 1636) was an Austrian Jesuit astronomer, after whom the crater Gruemberger on the Moon is named.

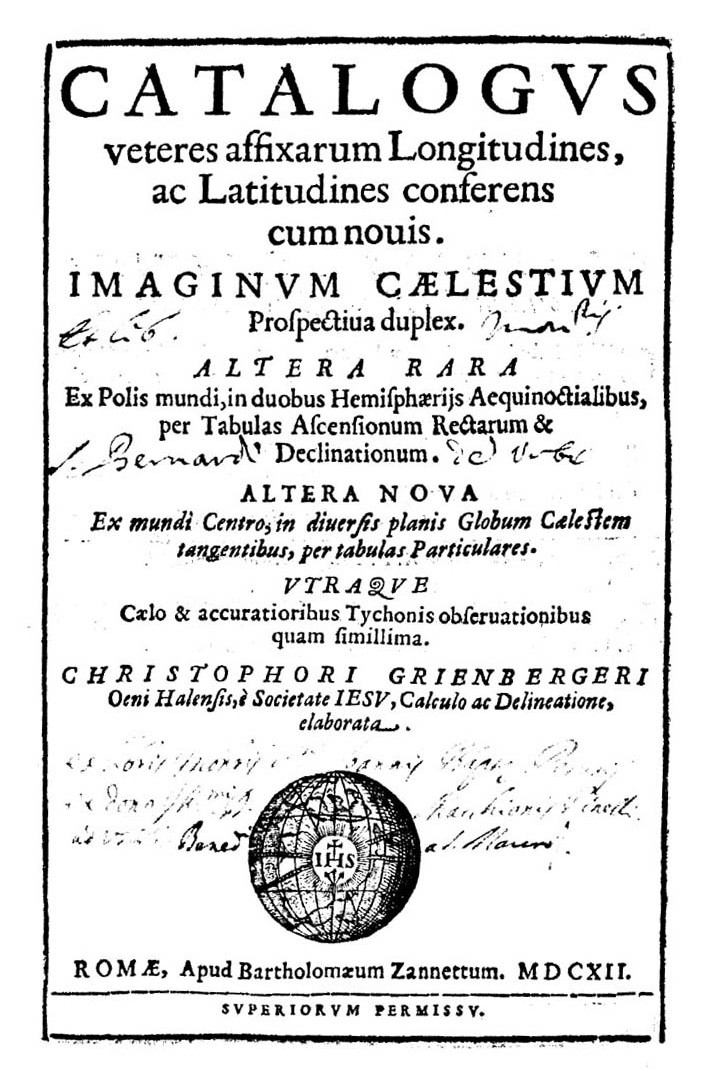
Catalogus veteres affixarum longitudines, ac latitudines conferens cum novis, 1612

== Biography ==
Born in Hall in Tirol, in 1580 Christoph Grienberger joined the Jesuits. He studied in Prague and Vienna, and subsequently succeeded his tutor, Christopher Clavius, as professor of mathematics at the Collegio Romano in 1612.

In 1610, Jesuit and high church officials had turned to Grienberger, as well as Clavius, Paolo Lembo, and Odo Van Maelcote, the other mathematicians on the faculty of the Collegio Romano, for their opinion on the new phenomena Galileo had discovered with his telescope. Grienberger sympathized with Galileo's theory of motion. However, he was asked to defend the Aristotelian view of the universe by Claudio Acquaviva, the Father General of the Jesuits.

Grienberger was not a prolific author–in his lifetime, his name was attached only to a thin volume of star-charts and a set of trigonometric tables–but he occupied a post that allowed him to review and evaluate the works of many other authors. As technical censor of all mathematical works written by Jesuit authors, Grienberger often sent authors his own corrections and calculations, which he recommended that they incorporate before their works could be published. His contemporaries acknowledged their debt to him. Mario Bettinus, author of Apiaria Universae Philosophiae Mathematicae, an encyclopedic collection of mathematical curiosities, includes in this text the following confession: "I have benefited, my Reader, from the mind and industry of the very learned and exceedingly modest man, Grienberger, who, while he would have discovered many marvellous things by himself, preferred to make himself serviceable to other people's inventions and other people's praises".

Giuseppe Biancani also corresponded with Grienberger, with whom he discussed his doubts over Galileo's assertion that there were mountains on the Moon.

Grienberger's lectures in astronomy had also prepared fellow Jesuits for missionary work in China. He also worked in the field of optics.

Grienberger is buried in Rome.

== Works ==
- Catalogus veteres affixarum longitudines, ac latitudines conferens cum novis (in Latin). Roma: Bartolomeo Zanetti (2.). 1612.
- Nova imaginum caelestium prospectiva (in Latin). Augsburg: Jakob Koppmayer. 1679.

== See also ==
- List of Jesuit scientists
- List of Roman Catholic scientist-clerics

== Sources ==
- (in English) Michael John Gorman, "Mathematics and Modesty in the Society of Jesus: the Problems of Christoph Grienberger (1564-1636)"
- (in English) Abstract of Franz Daxecker, “The astronomer Christoph Grienberger and the Galilei trial,” Acta Historica Astronomiae, vol. 18, p. 34-39
- (in English) The Galileo Project: Collegio Romano
