= The Assayer =

1623 book by Galileo Galilei

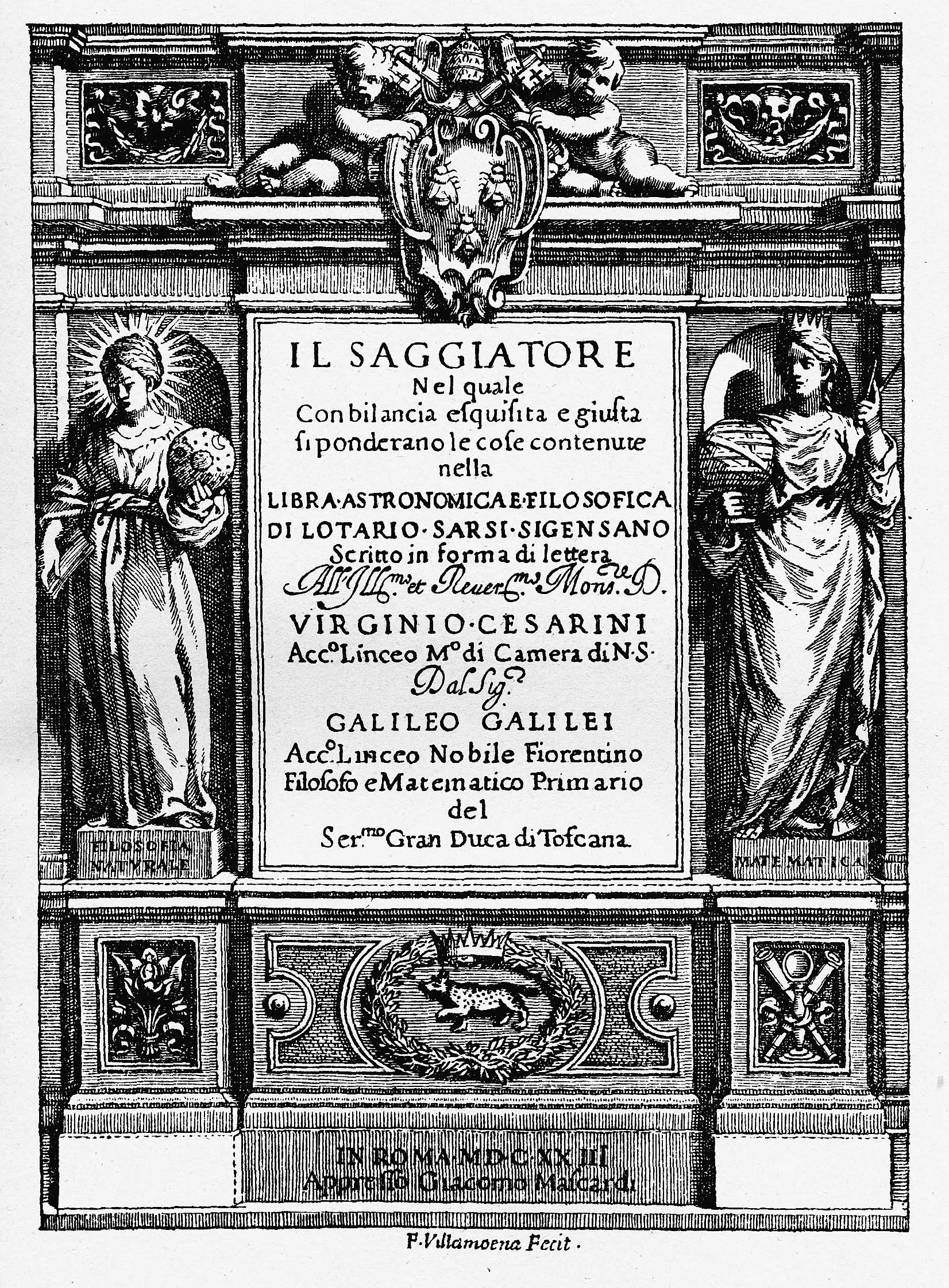
- Franceso Villamena's Frontispiece for The Assayer
- Author: Galileo Galilei
- Publication date: October 1623
- Publication place: Italy

The Assayer (Italian: Il saggiatore) is a book by Galileo Galilei, published in Rome in October 1623. It is generally considered to be one of the pioneering works of the scientific method, first broaching the idea that the book of nature is to be read with mathematical tools rather than those of scholastic philosophy, as generally held at the time. Despite the retroactive acclaim given to Galileo’s theory of knowledge, the empirical claim conjectured in the book — that comets and their observed properties are the product of optical phenomena — is incorrect.

== Background – Galileo vs. Grassi on comets ==
In 1619, Galileo became embroiled in a controversy with Father Orazio Grassi, professor of mathematics at the Jesuit Collegio Romano. It began as a dispute over the nature of comets, but by the time Galileo had published The Assayer, his last salvo in the dispute, it had become a much wider controversy over the very nature of science itself.

=== An Astronomical Disputation ===
The debate between Galileo and Grassi started in early 1619, when Father Grassi anonymously published the pamphlet, An Astronomical Disputation on the Three Comets of the Year 1618 (Disputatio astronomica de tribus cometis anni MDCXVIII), which discussed the nature of a comet that had appeared late in November of the previous year. Grassi concluded that the comet was a fiery, celestial body that had moved along a segment of a great circle at a constant distance from the earth, and since it moved in the sky more slowly than the Moon, it must be farther away than the Moon.

==== Tychonic system ====
Grassi adopted Tycho Brahe's Tychonic system, in which the other planets of the Solar System orbit around the Sun, which, in turn, orbits around the Earth. In his Disputatio Grassi referenced many of Galileo's observations, such as the surface of the Moon and the phases of Venus, without mentioning him. Grassi argued from the apparent absence of observable parallax that comets move beyond the Moon. Galileo never explicitly stated that comets are an illusion, but merely wondered if they are real or an optical illusion.

=== Discourse on Comets ===
Grassi's arguments and conclusions were criticised in a subsequent pamphlet, Discourse on Comets, published under the name of one of Galileo's disciples, a Florentine lawyer named Mario Guiducci, although it had been largely written by Galileo himself. Galileo and Guiducci offered no definitive theory of their own on the nature of comets, although they did present some tentative conjectures that are now known to be mistaken. (The correct approach to the study of comets had been proposed at the time by Tycho Brahe.) In its opening passage, Galileo and Guiducci's Discourse gratuitously insulted the Jesuit Christoph Scheiner, and various uncomplimentary remarks about the professors of the Collegio Romano were scattered throughout the work.

=== The Astronomical and Philosophical Balance ===
The Jesuits were offended, and Grassi soon replied with a polemical tract of his own, The Astronomical and Philosophical Balance (Libra astronomica ac philosophica), under the pseudonym Lothario Sarsio Sigensano, purporting to be one of his own pupils.

=== The Assayer ===
The Assayer was Galileo's devastating reply to the Astronomical Balance. It has been widely recognized as a masterpiece of polemical literature, in which "Sarsi's" arguments are subjected to withering scorn. It was greeted with wide acclaim, and particularly pleased the new pope, Urban VIII, to whom it had been dedicated. In Rome, in the previous decade, Barberini, the future Urban VIII, had come down on the side of Galileo and the Lincean Academy.

Galileo's dispute with Grassi permanently alienated many Jesuits, and Galileo and his friends were convinced that they were responsible for bringing about his later condemnation, although supporting evidence for this is not conclusive.

== Science, mathematics, and philosophy ==
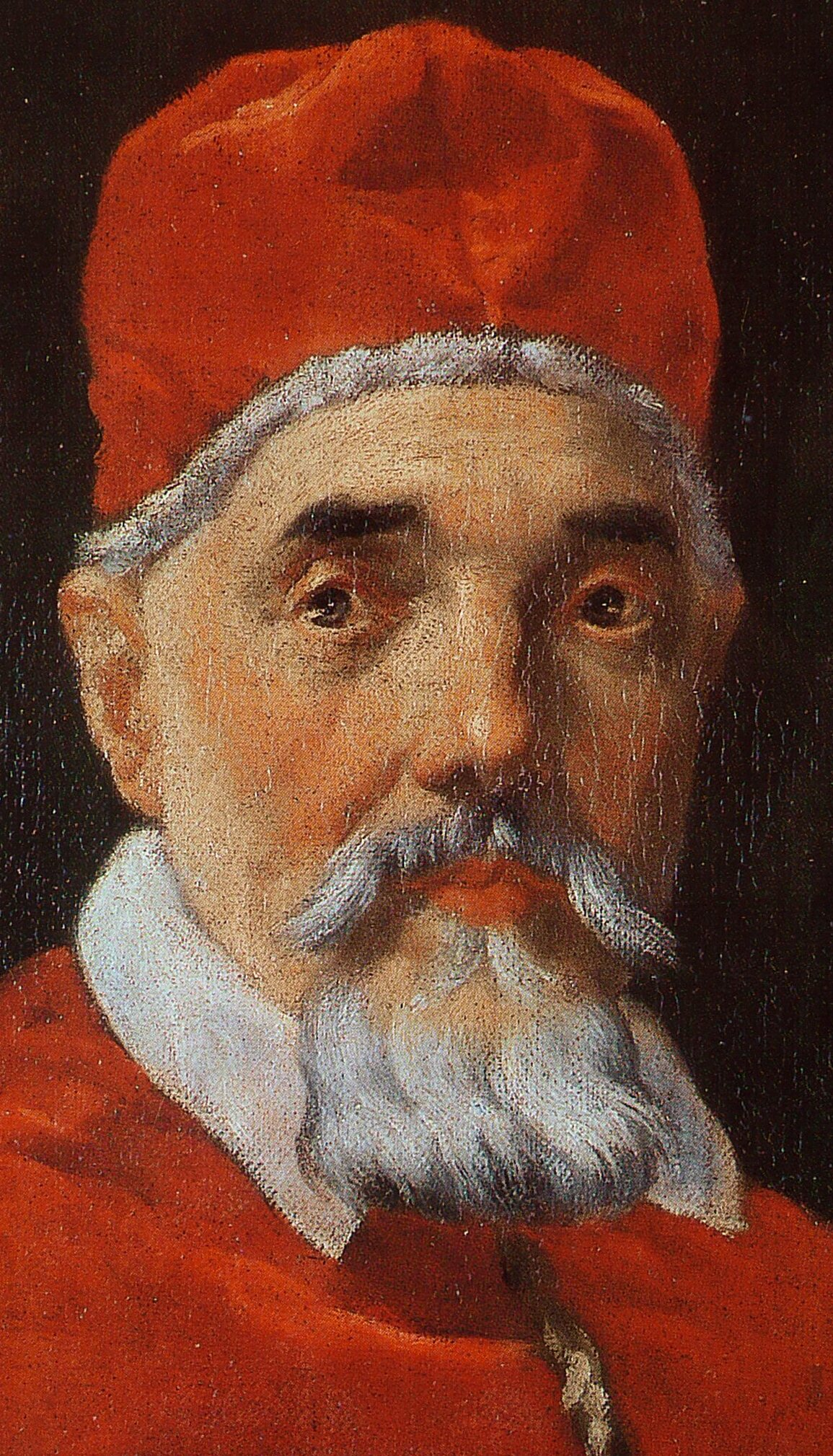
Pope Urban VIII

In 1616 Galileo may have been silenced on Copernicanism. In 1623 his supporter and friend, Cardinal Maffeo Barberini, a former patron of the Accademia dei Lincei and uncle of future Cardinal Francesco Barberini, became Pope Urban VIII. The election of Barberini seemed to assure Galileo of support at the highest level in the Church. A visit to Rome confirmed this. The Assayer is a milestone in the history of science: here Galileo describes the scientific method, which was quite a revolution at the time.

The title page of The Assayer shows the crest of the Barberini family, featuring three busy bees. The book was dedicated to the new pope. The title page also shows that Urban VIII employed a member of the Accademia dei Lincei, Cesarini, at a high level in the papal service. This book was edited and published by members of the Accademia.

In The Assayer Galileo mainly criticized Grassi's method of inquiry, heavily biased by his religious belief and based on ipse dixit, rather than his hypothesis on comets. Furthermore, he insisted that natural philosophy (i.e. physics) should be mathematical. According to the title page, he was the philosopher (i.e. physicist) of the Grand Duke of Tuscany, not merely the mathematician. Natural philosophy (physics) spans the gamut from processes of generation and growth (represented by a plant) to the physical structure of the universe, represented by the cosmic cross-section. Mathematics, on the other hand, is symbolized by telescopes, and an astrolabe.

=== The language of science ===
The Assayer contains Galileo's famous statement that mathematics is the language of science. Only through mathematics can one achieve lasting truth in physics. Those who neglect mathematics wander endlessly in a dark labyrinth. From the book:

Philosophy [i.e. natural philosophy] is written in this grand book—I mean the Universe—which stands continually open to our gaze, but it cannot be understood unless one first learns to comprehend the language and interpret the characters in which it is written. It is written in the language of mathematics, and its characters are triangles, circles, and other geometrical figures, without which it is humanly impossible to understand a single word of it; without these, one is wandering around in a dark labyrinth.

Galileo used a sarcastic and witty tone throughout the essay. The book was read with delight at the dinner table by Urban VIII. In 1620 Maffeo Barberini wrote a poem entitled Adulatio Perniciosa in Galileo's honor. An official, Giovanni di Guevara, said that The Assayer was free from any unorthodoxy.

=== Perceived vs. real phenomena ===
In The Assayer Galileo described heat as an artifact of our minds. He wrote that heat, pressure, smell and other phenomena perceived by our senses are apparent properties only, caused by the movement of particles, which is a real phenomenon. Galileo also theorized that senses such as smell and taste are made possible by the release of tiny particles from their host substances, which was correct but not proven until later.

... about the proposition “motion is the cause of heat”... I suspect that people in general have a concept of this which is very remote from the truth. For they believe that heat is a real phenomenon, or property ... which actually resides in the material by which we feel ourselves warmed.

Whenever I conceive any ... corporeal substance, I immediately ... think of it as ... having this or that shape; as being large or small ... and in some specific place at any given time; as being in motion or at rest; as touching or not touching some other body; and as being one in number, or few, or many. From these conditions I cannot separate such a substance by any stretch of my imagination. But that it must be white or red, bitter or sweet, noisy or silent, and of sweet or foul odor, my mind does not feel compelled ... Without the senses ... reason ... would probably never arrive at qualities like these. Hence I think that tastes, odors, colors, and so on are no more than mere names so far as the object in which we place them is concerned, and that they reside only in the consciousness. Hence if the living creature were removed, all these qualities would be ... annihilated.

Those minute particles ... may enter by our nostrils and strike upon some small protuberances which are the instrument of smelling; here likewise their touch ... is received to our like or dislike according as they have this or that shape, are fast or slow, and are numerous or few.

== See also ==
- Book of Nature
