= Islam in Monaco =

Overview of Islam in Monaco

Islam in Monaco is the religion of a very small minority in the Principality of Monaco, where Roman Catholicism is the official state religion. The Constitution guarantees freedom of worship and its public exercise, yet there is no mosque in the principality and the Muslim community has never obtained official recognition as a religious association. Muslims who wish to pray in congregation usually go to neighbouring France, particularly Beausoleil, or use private prayer rooms.

== History ==
=== Early medieval period ===
Monaco lies on the coast between Provence and Liguria, a region affected in the late 9th and 10th centuries by the Muslim presence centred on Fraxinetum (modern La Garde-Freinet) in the Massif des Maures. The fortress was established around 887–890 by Muslims from al-Andalus and remained under Muslim control for more than eighty years. Mohammad Ballan has argued that Fraxinetum should be understood as an Islamic frontier state rather than merely a pirate base.

The abduction of Abbot Maiolus of Cluny in July 972 provoked a military campaign led by Count William I of Provence. The Muslim stronghold was evacuated after the Battle of Tourtour in 972–973. Monégasque historical tradition records that the area was ravaged by “Saracens” after the fall of the Western Roman Empire and that the Saracens were expelled around 975, after which the coast was gradually resettled. The specialised literature on Fraxinetum, however, focuses almost exclusively on Provence and the Alpine passes; direct evidence of Muslim activity on the Rock of Monaco itself remains limited.

=== Modern period ===
The House of Grimaldi has ruled Monaco, with brief interruptions, since 1297. No organised Muslim community is documented in the principality before the modern era. The present-day community consists largely of foreign residents, many of North African origin.

== Demographics ==
The Monegasque authorities do not publish official census data on religious affiliation. Estimates therefore rely on community informants and secondary sources. Successive reports by the U.S. Department of State (including the 2023 edition) cite a long-time Muslim resident who placed the community at approximately 200 people, the large majority non-citizens from North Africa. The Association of Religion Data Archives / World Religion Database estimates Muslims at roughly 0.45 % of the population; other secondary sources occasionally give a figure around 280 (approximately 0.8 %). Roman Catholics are estimated at 80–90 % of residents.

Monégasque nationals form a minority of the total population: 9,179 people, or 23.9 %, according to the 2024 edition of the official statistical yearbook Monaco en Chiffres. The overall resident population stands at approximately 38,000–39,000.

== Legal status ==
Article 9 of the Constitution of 17 December 1962 declares Roman Catholicism the state religion. Article 23 guarantees freedom of worship, its public exercise, and freedom of expression; no one may be compelled to participate in the rites of any religion.

Any religious association that wishes to open a place of worship, own or lease property, or employ staff must first obtain recognition from the Ministry of the Interior. The Ministry is required to reply within one month; failing a reply, approval is automatic. The government has recognised the Protestant, Greek and Russian Orthodox, Jewish, Baha’i, Buddhist and Jehovah’s Witness communities. Construction of a place of worship in a public space requires additional prior authorisation. High real-estate prices are regularly cited as a practical obstacle for all religious groups.

There's no Muslim association had obtained official recognition. The Jehovah’s Witnesses association was registered on 19 November 2022 after proceedings before Monaco’s Supreme Court and the European Court of Human Rights. Commentators observed that the constitutional guarantee of freedom of worship underpinned the decision and continues to frame the legal position of other minorities.

== Places of worship ==
There is no mosque or dedicated Islamic place of worship inside Monaco. Muslims normally attend facilities in Beausoleil (immediately across the French border and within walking distance of parts of Monaco) or further afield in Nice, or pray in private rooms. The Beausoleil prayer room, sometimes called the “Petite Mosquée”, is managed by a legally responsible association and has been described in the local press as an example of municipal cooperation; a municipal gymnasium has been made available for Friday prayers.

== Society ==
U.S. Department of State reports for recent years record no incidents of societal abuse or discrimination against Muslims. Representatives of the Muslim, Protestant and Jewish communities have stated that they see no need to open their own religious schools; the only private religious schools in the principality are Catholic. Staff of the U.S. Consulate General in Marseille (accredited to Monaco) have met community representatives on several occasions.

== See also ==
- Religion in Monaco
- Islam in France
- Fraxinetum
- History of the Jews in Monaco
- Islam in Europe
