= Muslim presence in medieval France =

The Muslim presence in medieval France corresponds to the Saracen presence for several periods between 719 and 973 in the province of Septimania and then in Provence until 1197, of Muslim populations, mainly Arabs, Berbers, and also Europeans who converted to Islam (Muwallads).

A first phase of presence, following the Umayyad conquest of Hispania, is recorded between 719 and 759 in the province of Septimania with Narbonne as its capital.

A second phase of presence lasted nearly 80 years, between 890 and 973, during which Muslims had established several fortified camps in the vicinity of Saint-Tropez in the middle of the Massif des Maures, with Fraxinetum as its chief town, which Arab written sources call Gabal al qilâl ("the mountain of the summits"), and farahsinêt (the phonetic transcription of Fraxinetum), i.e., the present-day hinterland of the Gulf of Saint-Tropez.

== Razzias (759 - 890) ==
After the submission of Roussillon to the Frankish kingdom following the capture of Narbonne in 759, Pepin immediately directed all his war effort against the Duchy of Aquitaine.

Frankish domination of neighboring Catalonia began with the conquest of Girona (785) and Barcelona (801). Pepin, Charlemagne's father, fulfilled the Frankish objective of extending the kingdom's defensive borders beyond Septimania and the Pyrenees, creating a solid barrier between the Emirate of Cordoba and Francia.

The territory gained from the Muslims, called the "Marca Hispanica", became a buffer zone made up of counties dependent on the Carolingian monarchs. Among them, the one that played the most important role was the County of Barcelona, from where the Reconquista will more or less start.

This did not prevent the Muslims from returning to Provence in 760, then in 787 in the Dentelles de Montmirail where they pillaged Prébayon. Their pressure was so strong again in Septimania that Charlemagne charged his cousin William, Count of Toulouse, with driving them back. The two armies clashed from 793 to 795. In 793, a new Saracen expedition failed before the gates of Carcassonne. William liberated Orange, which earned him the title of Prince of this city, and defeated the Saracens near Narbonne.

Despite the expansion of the Carolingian Empire and its certain power, the Mediterranean remained dominated by the Muslim navy. In these times of Arab-Muslim expansion, the control of Sicily, Corsica, the Balearic Islands and the Iberian Peninsula allowed them great mobility along the coasts of Septimania and Provence, among other things, to carry out their slave raid razzias, as they did during the same period in southern Italy and until the end of the Barbary slave trade period (after the Barbary wars in 1801–1815).

Having made Corsica their hideout, Muslims returned to the coasts of Provence in 813 in order to supply themselves with slaves for slavery in al-Andalus. Then they besieged Marseille in 838, looting it and taking its clerics and nuns captive. The Abbey of St Victor in Marseille was destroyed. Between 844 and 850, they went up the Ouvèze valley, where they pillaged Vaison and then went down to Arles, which they besieged. They were again in lower Provence in 869 to attack Marseille and Arles.

From 890, the Umayyads tried to regain a foothold in France around Fraxinet, in the Massif des Maures.

== Eight more decades of presence (890 - 973) ==
=== The Massif des Maures: The return of the Moors ===
Expansion of the Franks

The years 880 and 890 mark a turning point in the Muslim strategy. Muslims came from Alicante and settled near Saint-Tropez in the Freinet area (today's cantons of Grimaud and Saint-Tropez) and from there spread throughout the Alps. This "stronghold" has never been found; it is not proven to this day that this "contingent" was permanent: it may have been a question of temporary, one-off operations and occupations.

Muslims may have given name to the neighboring village of Ramatuelle; Évariste Lévi-Provençal, who is not a toponymist, derives the toponym Ramatuelle from the Arabic Rahmat-ûllah (or Rahmatu-Allah) "divine mercy", but not to the Massif des Maures, nor to the Maurienne, where part of the Muslim community settled in the Arc valley, "The name Maurienne does not find its origin in the word "Maure", relating to the incursions of the tenth century Saracens. Mentioned by Gregory of Tours in the 6th century, it is rather a derivative of the Latin Malus Rivus, bad stream, which evolved into mau riou/rien. Indeed, the river Arc is known for its floods."

One of the most deadly raids took place in Upper Provence and in the Apt region in 896. For almost a century, they lived in the country, looting and ransoming it.

In 923, the Muslims, who had landed in the Massif des Maures, were unable to take Marseille, but they did devastate the Abbey of St Victor. The bishop of Marseille left the city to take refuge in Arles. Several alliances and misalliances with local princes followed, until the final break with the viscounts of Marseille.

In 929, the Emirate of Cordoba became the Caliphate of Cordoba.

During the nights of the 21st to the 22nd of August 973, the Moors took Maïeul, the abbot of Cluny, prisoner at the Châtelard bridge, near Orsières in Valais. The Moors thought that by kidnapping him, they could obtain an important ransom. Since 921, the Muslim bands, coming from Provence, had taken control of many important passages in the western Alps (other sourcesclaim that the Franks had installed them there to block the Lombards) including the Mont-Joux pass that the abbot had just crossed before being recognized and taken. The monks of Provence succeeded in collecting the requested ransom. Keeping their word, the Saracens freed their hostage.

In September, William and Rotbold, sons of Count Boson II, rallied all the nobility of Provence, but also of Viennois and Nice. At the head of the Provençal host reinforced by the troops of Ardouin, Count of Turin, they tracked down the Moors whom they crushed during the Battle of Tourtour in 973, then drove them out of their fortified bases in Provence. The precise site of the battle remains unknown.

=== Birth of the aristocracy of Provence ===
This military campaign against the Muslims, conducted without Conrad's troops, in fact masked a bringing to heel of Provence, of the local aristocracy and of the urban and peasant communities which had always refused feudal mutation and countal power until then. It allowed William to obtain the suzerainty of Provence and with the royal consent, to control the tax system of Provence.

William distributed the reconquered lands to his vassals, such as the territory of Hyères which he attributed to the lords of Fos. He arbitrated disputes and thus created the feudal system of Provence. With Isarn, bishop of Grenoble, he undertook the mission to repopulate the Dauphiné and authorized an Italian count named Ugo Blavia to settle near Fréjus at the beginning of the 970s in order to cultivate the land.

Various Muslim raids still reached the French coast, notably the islands of Lérins in 1003, 1047, 1107 and 1197. The last Muslim incursion into Corsica (by the Emir Abu Hosein Mogehid) took place in 1014. The Caliphate of Cordoba broke up in 1031 into several small emirates, the taifas, which were completed by the Reconquista in 1492.

=== Slave trade of the Saracens ===
During the Middle Ages, Saracen pirates established themselves in bases in France, the Baleares, Southern Italy and Sicily, from which they raided the coasts of the Christian Mediterranean and exported their prisoners as Saqaliba slaves to the slave markets of the Muslim Middle East.

Moorish Saracen pirates from al-Andalus attacked Marseille and Arles and established a base in Camargue, Fraxinetum or La Garde-Freinet-Les Mautes (888–972), from which they made slave raids in to France; the population fled in fear of the slave raids, which made it difficult for the Frankish to secure their Southern coast, and the Saracens of Fraxinetum exported the Frankish prisoners they captured as slaves to the slave market of the Muslim Middle East. Many of the enslaved "Frankish" Saqaliba in Al-Andalus were really ethnic Visigoths and Hispano-Romans from the Hispanic March in northeastern Iberia, later to be known as the Catalan counties.

While the Saracen bases in France was eliminated in 972 and Italy in 1091, this did not prevent the Saracen piracy slave trade of the Mediterranean; both Almoravid dynasty (1040–1147) and the Almohad Caliphate (1121–1269) approved of the slave raiding of Saracen pirates toward non-Muslim ships in Gibraltar and the Mediterranean for the purpose of slave raiding.
