= Ibn Hawqal =

10th century Arab writer and geographer

- Born: Nisibis, Abbasid Caliphate (modern-day Nusaybin, Mardin, Turkey)
- Died: after 978

Academic background
- Influences: Al-Balkhi

Academic work
- Era: Islamic Golden Age
- School or tradition: Balkhi school
- Main interests: Islamic geography
- Notable works: Surat al-Ard

Muḥammad Abū’l-Qāsim Ibn Ḥawqal (محمد أبو القاسم بن حوقل), also known as Abū al-Qāsim b. ʻAlī Ibn Ḥawqal al-Naṣībī, was a 10th-century Arab Muslim writer, geographer, and chronicler. Born in Nisibis, Upper Mesopotamia; he travelled in various countries from AD 943 to 969. His famous work, written in 977, is known as Surat al-Ard (صورة الارض; 'the face of the earth'). The date of his death, known from his writings, was after AH 368/AD 978.

== Biography ==
Details known of Ibn Hawqal's life are extrapolated from his book. He spent the last thirty years of his life traveling to remote parts of Asia and Africa, and writing about different things he saw during his journey. One journey brought him 20° south of the equator along the East African coast where he discovered large populations in regions the ancient Greek writers had deemed uninhabitable.

== Ṣūrat al-’Arḍ ==
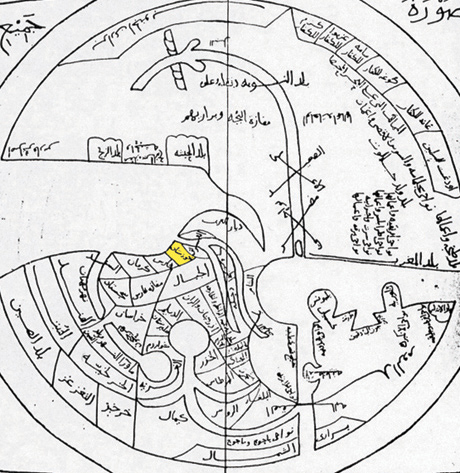
10th century map of the World by Ibn Hawqal. For an English version, see here.

Ibn Hawqal based his great work of geography on a revision and augmentation of the text called Masālik ul-Mamālik by Istakhri (AD 951), which itself was a revised edition of the Ṣuwar al-aqālīm by Ahmed ibn Sahl al-Balkhi, (ca. AD 921). However Ibn Hawqal was more than an editor. He was a travel writer writing in the style followed later by Abu Ubaydallah al-Bakri in his Kitab al-Masālik wa-al-Mamālik, a literary genre which uses reports of merchants and travellers. Ibn Hawqal introduces 10th century humour into his account of Sicily during the Kalbid-Fatimid dynasty. As a primary source his medieval geography tends to exaggerate, depicting the "barbaric and uncivilised" Christians of Palermo, reflecting the prevailing politics and attitudes of his time. Yet his geographic accounts of his personal travels were relied upon, and found useful, by medieval Arab travellers.

The chapters on al-Andalus, Sicily, and the richly cultivated area of Fraxinet (La Garde-Freinet) describes in detail a number of regional innovations practiced by Muslim farmers and fishermen.

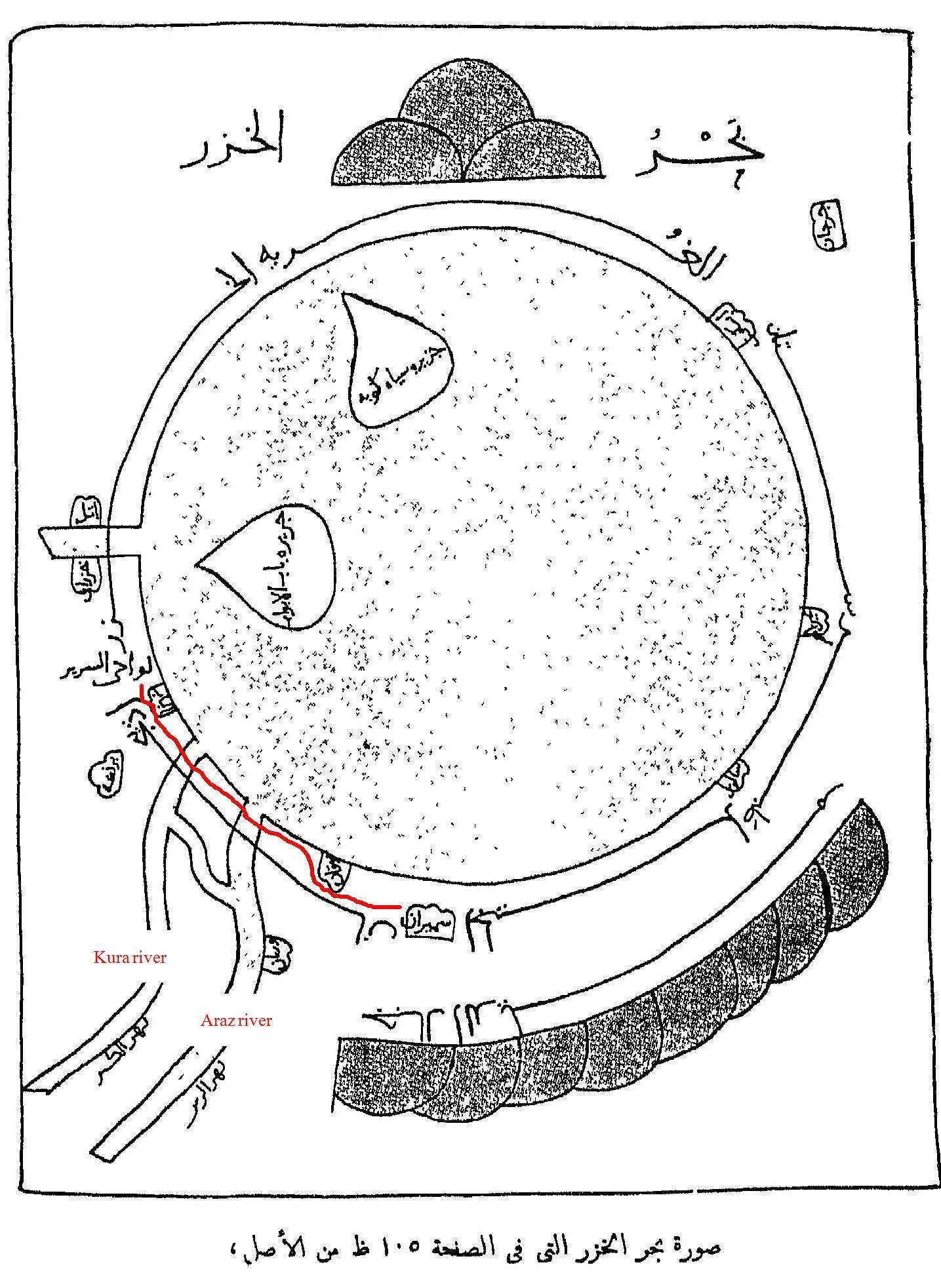
10th century map of the Caspian sea by Ibn Hawqal

The chapter on the Byzantine Empire—known in the Muslim world as, and called by the Byzantines themselves, the "Lands of the Romans"—gives his first-hand observation of the 360 languages spoken in the Caucasus, with the lingua franca being Arabic and Persian across the region. With the description of Kiev, he may have mentioned the route of the Volga Bulgars and the Khazars, which was perhaps taken from Sviatoslav I of Kiev. He also published a cartographic map of Sindh together with accounts of the geography and culture of Sindh and the Indus River. An anonymous epitome of the book was written in AD 1233.

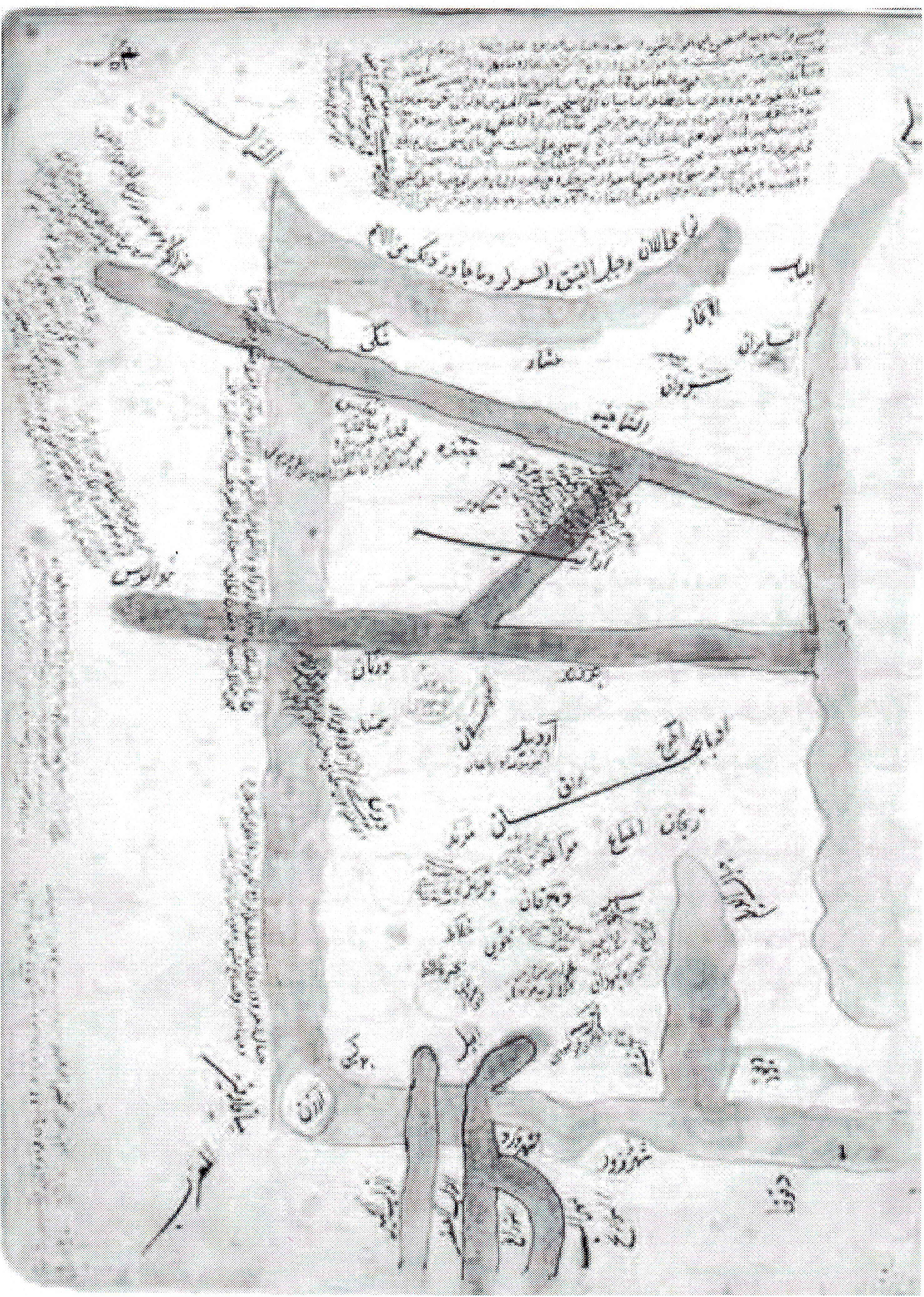
10th century map of the Caspian sea by Ibn Hawqal

== Editions ==
In the 1870s, the famous Dutch orientalist Michael Jan de Goeje edited a selection of manuscript texts by Arab geographers, which was published by Brill, Leiden in the eight-volume series Bibliotheca geographorum Arabicorum. Ibn Haukal's text was the second volume published in 1873 under the Latin title Viae et Regna, descriptio ditionis Moslemicae auctore Abu'l-Kásim Ibn Haukal - "Routes and Realms, a description of Muslim territories by the author Abu'l-Kásim Ibn Haukal".

== See also ==
- Al-Maqdisi
- Ibn al-Faqih
- Qudama ibn Ja'far
- Ibn Khordadbeh
- Ibn Rustah
- Al-Ya'qubi
- Al-Masudi
- Muslim scholars
