= Battle of Fraxinet =

942 battle between Hungarian raiders and the Muslim state of Fraxinetum

- Part of the Hungarian invasions of Europe
Date	c. 20 May 942
Location	Fraxinet, France
Result	Hungarian victory

Belligerents
Hungarians; Kabar auxiliary troops	Fraxinetum

Casualties and losses
Not significant	Relatively high

The Battle of Fraxinet or Fraxinetum was fought around 20 May 942, between a Hungarian raiding army and the Muslim frontier state of Fraxinet, and ended with a Hungarian victory.

== Background ==
As Ibn Ḥayyān preserved in his work Kitāb al-Muqtabis fī tarīkh al-Andalus, the Hungarians (or Magyars), in 942, passed through the Kingdom of the Lombards (northern Italy) and then through southern France, skirmishing along the way. They then invaded Thaghr al-Aqṣā ("Furthest March"), the northwestern frontier province of the Caliphate of Córdoba.

Through the land of Aquileia, the Hungarians with Kabar auxiliary troops arrived to Italy by the spring of 942. There Hugh of Italy paid the previously agreed annual amount of tax (ten bushels of gold) then sent them to Hispania, according to the account of Liutprand of Cremona. As historian Ferenc Makk claims Hugh hired the Hungarians to a west oriented military campaign because of the Muslims of Fraxinet's continuous raids against his kingdom, including Provence. In addition, Hugh summoned a fleet from the Byzantine Empire in order to destroy the coastal forts in Fraxinet.

== Battle ==
In early May 942, the Hungarian forces left Pavia for southern France. Just before 20 May, they arrived at Fraxinet, where the battle took place against the Muslims. As friar Ekkehard wrote in his chronicle Casus Sancti Galli (first half of 11th century) among the events from 926 to 937, the skirmish ended when Conrad I of Burgundy (r. 937–993) sent envoys to both armies warning them of the other. The envoys offered Burgundian aid to each invader against the other and then informed them of the other's whereabouts. When the Magyars and Saracens met, the Burgundians held back and only attacked when the opposing forces were spent. In this way, both invading armies were destroyed and the captives sold into slavery in Arles.

Italian historian Gina Fasoli considered that Ekkehard mistakenly confused Hugh with Conrad. Other scholars dated the event to 924, 926, 937, 943, 951 or 954. Makk argues the battle bound to happen during the rule of Conrad, excluding the years 924 and 926. He adds, the minor Conrad resided in the court of Otto I of Germany until early 943, which excludes his role in 937 or 942. The Hungarians led a campaign against the Byzantines in 943, omitting the western military raids. Makk also emphasizes, Conrad did not participate in any major struggles against the Muslims of Fraxinet, including the decisive Battle of Tourtour in 973. However Hugh's victorious naval campaign of 942 against the "Saracens" is well known in historiography, and during that time, he was in a political-military alliance with the Magyars.

In Hungarian history, this was the first documented skirmish against a Muslim enemy. The Magyars defeated the "Saracens" and they continued on their way to Hispania. Their victory laid the foundation of a successful Italian–Byzantine campaign against the Muslims in the Mediterranean Sea.

== Sources ==
- Ballan, Mohamad (2010). "Fraxinetum: An Islamic Frontier State in Tenth Century Provence". Comitatus: A Journal of Medieval and Renaissance Studies. 41: 23–76. doi:10.1353/cjm.2010.0053. S2CID 144048972.
- Makk, Ferenc (2009). "A fraxinetumi csata [The Battle of Fraxinet]". In Körmendi, Tamás; Thoroczkay, Gábor (eds.). Auxilium Historiae. Tanulmányok a hetvenesztendős Bertényi Iván tiszteletére (in Hungarian). Faculty of Arts, Eötvös Loránd University. pp. 207–213. ISBN 978-963-284-105-2.
- Róna-Tas, András (1999). Hungarians and Europe in the Early Middle Ages: An Introduction to Early Hungarian History. Budapest: Central European University Press.
