= Book of Roads and Kingdoms =

Islamic geographical manuscripts

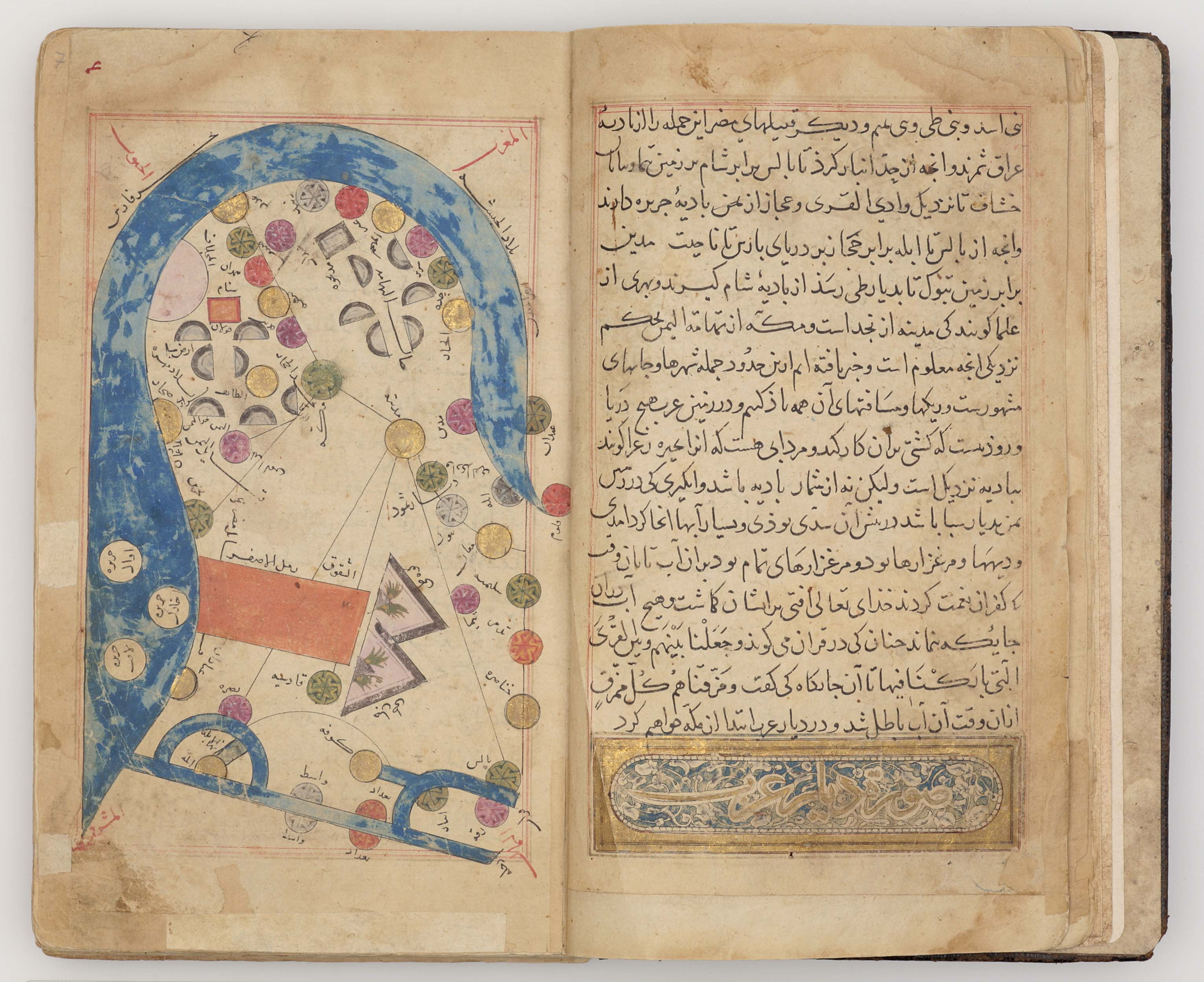
Map of Arabia from the Kitab al-Masalik wa'l-Mamalik by al-Istakhri (copy dated to c. 1306 CE)

The Book of Roads and Kingdoms (Arabic: كتاب المسالك والممالك, Kitāb al-Masālik waʿl-Mamālik) is a group of Islamic manuscripts composed from the Middle Ages to the early modern period. They emerged from the administrative tradition of listing pilgrim and post stages. Their text covers the cities, roads, topography, and peoples of the Muslim world, interspersed with personal anecdotes. A theoretical explanation of the "Inhabited Quarter" of the world, comparable to the ecumene, frames the world with classical concepts like the seven climes.

The books include illustrations so geometric that they are barely recognizable as maps. These schematic maps do not attempt a mimetic depiction of physical boundaries. With little change in design, the treatises typically offer twenty regional maps and a disc-shaped map of the world surrounded by the Encircling Ocean. The maps have a flat quality, but the textual component implies a spherical Earth. An Andalusi scholar Abi Bakr Zuhri explained, "Their objective is the depiction of the earth, even if it does not correspond to reality. Because the earth is spherical but the [map] is simple".

The first, incomplete Kitāb al-Masālik wa'l-Mamālik by Ja‘far ibn Ahmad al-Marwazi is now lost. The earliest surviving version was written by Ibn Khordadbeh circa 870 CE, during the reigns of Abbasid caliphs al-Wathiq and al-Mu'tamid. The earliest known version of the idiosyncratic cartography was composed by al-Istakhri circa 950 CE, although only copies by later artists survive. As he was a follower of Abu Zayd al-Balkhi, this style of map-making is often referred to as the "Balkhī school", or the "Classical School". Leiden University Libraries holds مختصر كتاب المسالك والممالك لابي اسحاق ابراهيم بن محمد الاصطخري / World map in a summary of Kitab al-masalik wa’l mamalik, MS Or. 3101, 1193. The maps are sometimes called the "Atlas of Islam", or abbreviated as KMMS maps. This tradition of mapping appears in related works including Ibn Hawqal's Ṣūrat al-’Arḍ (صورة الارض; "The face of the Earth").

== History ==
The first, incomplete Kitāb al-Masālik wa'l-Mamālik by Ja‘far ibn Ahmad al-Marwazi is now lost. The earliest surviving version was written by Ibn Khordadbeh circa 870 CE, during the reigns of Abbasid caliphs al-Wathiq and al-Mu'tamid. Ibn Khordadbeh's text was the first to arrange the world according to the qibla. In Islam, the qibla is the direction to orient prayers in order to face towards the Kaaba in Mecca. This results in a circular model of the world with Mecca in the center and other locations radiating outward.

The earliest known version of the idiosyncratic cartography was composed by al-Istakhri circa 950 CE, although only copies by later artists survive. As he was a follower of Abu Zayd al-Balkhi, this style of map-making is often referred to as the "Balkhī school", or the "Classical School". The maps are sometimes called the "Atlas of Islam", or abbreviated as KMMS maps. This tradition of mapping appears in related works including Ibn Hawqal's Ṣūrat al-’Arḍ (صورة الارض; "The face of the Earth").

Ibn Hawqal began work on a revised copy of the Book of Roads and Kingdoms, but shifted to creating his own geographical treatise covering everything he knew of geography. The treatises belong to what historian Zayde Antrim calls the "discourse of place". This literary tradition both describes the significance of the land and through writing gives the land literary and spiritual meaning. It includes geographical works, travelogues, poetry, topographical works, and anthologies.

There are unresolved questions about the authorship of the works of Ibn Hawqal, al-Istakhri, and al-Balkhi. Around 921 AD, al-Istakhri likely used a series of annotated maps by al-Balkhi as the basis for an expanded commentary on those maps, or similar maps derived from them. According to Ibn Hawqal, he met al-Istakhri while traveling and began a revision of his work, completed by 988. Manuscripts attributed to Ibn Hawqal contain much material from manuscripts attributed to al-Istakhri. It's unclear what material is coming from Ibn Hawqal, from al-Istakhri, and what if any is coming from al-Balkhi. This is compounded by additions and changes made by later, often anonymous, copyists.

Most surviving manuscripts are later copies; few texts from the tenth century survive and even fewer original texts. Leiden University Libraries holds مختصر كتاب المسالك والممالك لابي اسحاق ابراهيم بن محمد الاصطخري / World map in a summary of Kitab al-masalik wa’l mamalik, MS Or. 3101, 1193.

== Works ==
- Book of Roads and Kingdoms, written in the 9th century by Ibn Khordadbeh.
- Book of Roads and Kingdoms, written in the early 10th century by Istakhri.
- Book of Roads and Kingdoms, written in the mid 11th century by al-Bakri in Spain.
- Book of Roads and Kingdoms, written in the 10th century by Ibn Hawqal.
- Book of Roads and Kingdoms, written in the 10th century by al-Hasan ibn Ahmad al-Muhallabi.
- Book of Roads and Kingdoms, written in the 10th century by Muhammad ibn Yūsuf al-Warrāq.
- Book of Roads and Kingdoms, written in the 9th century by Ahmad ibn al-Harith al-Kharraz (al-Khazzaz).
- Book of Roads and Kingdoms, written in the 10th century by Abu Abdallah Muhammad ibn Ahmad al-Jayhani.

== Gallery ==
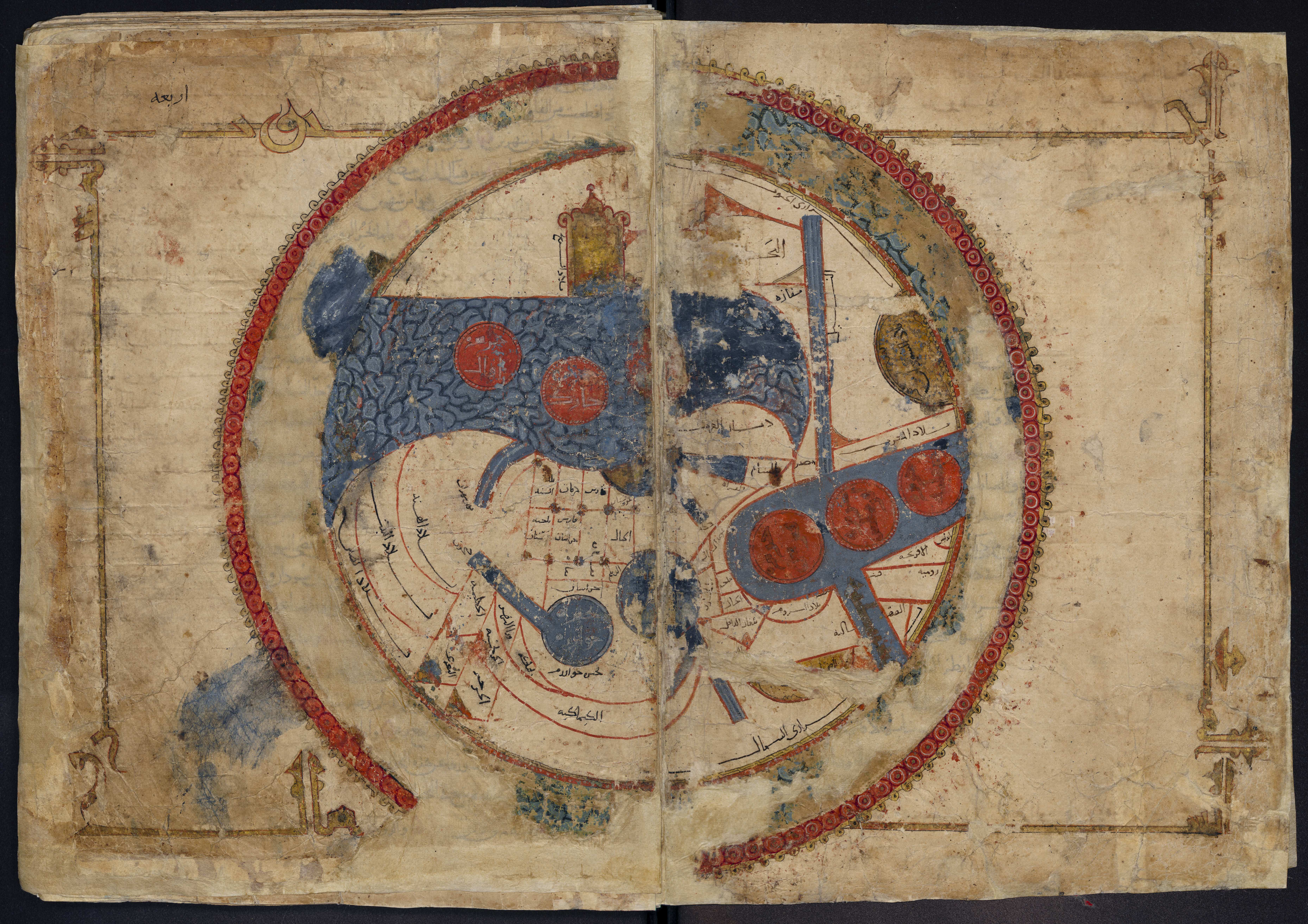
Istakhri's world map (South at top, copy dated to 1193) Leiden University Libraries

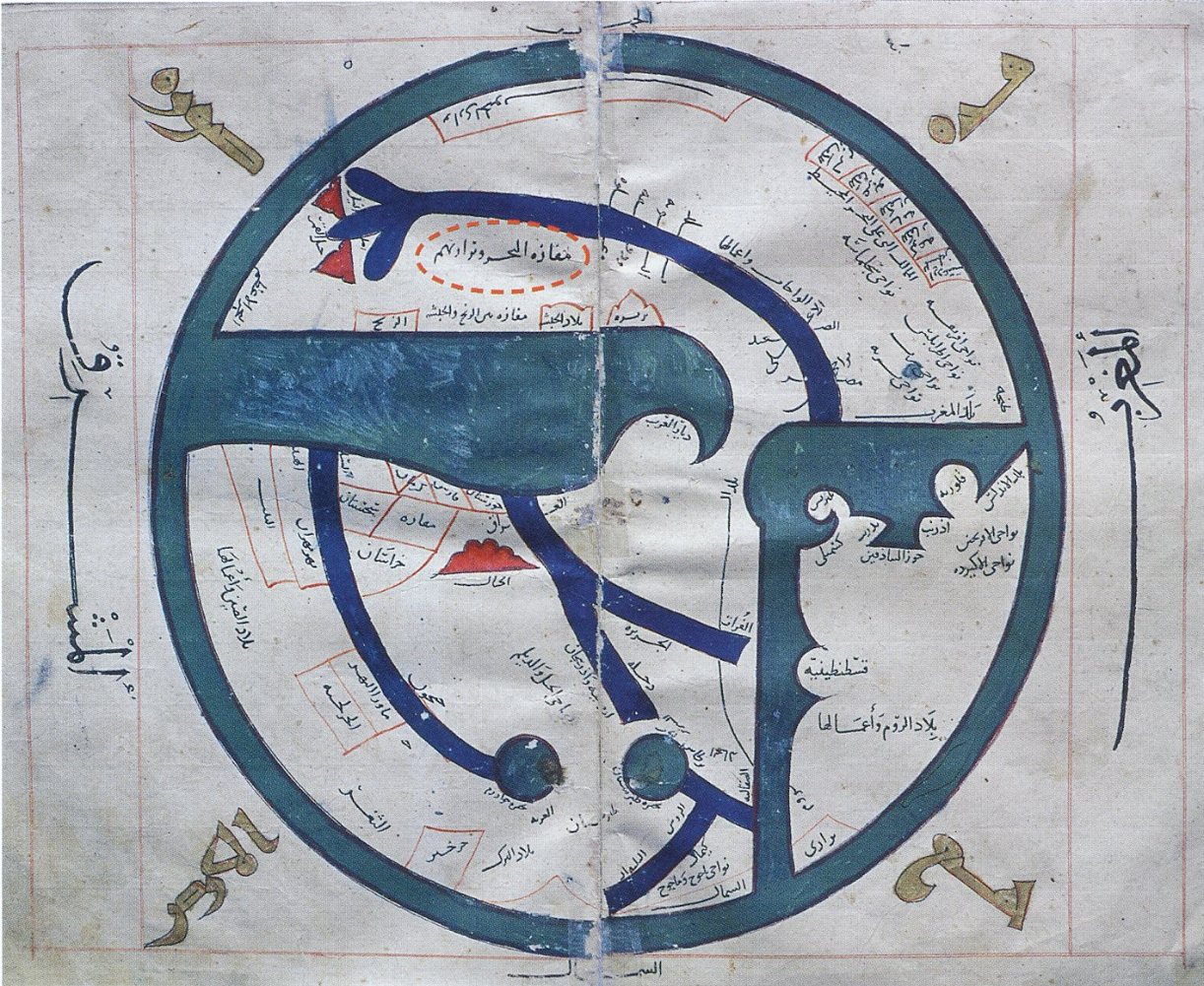
Ibn Hawqal's world map (South at top, copy dated to the 14th century)

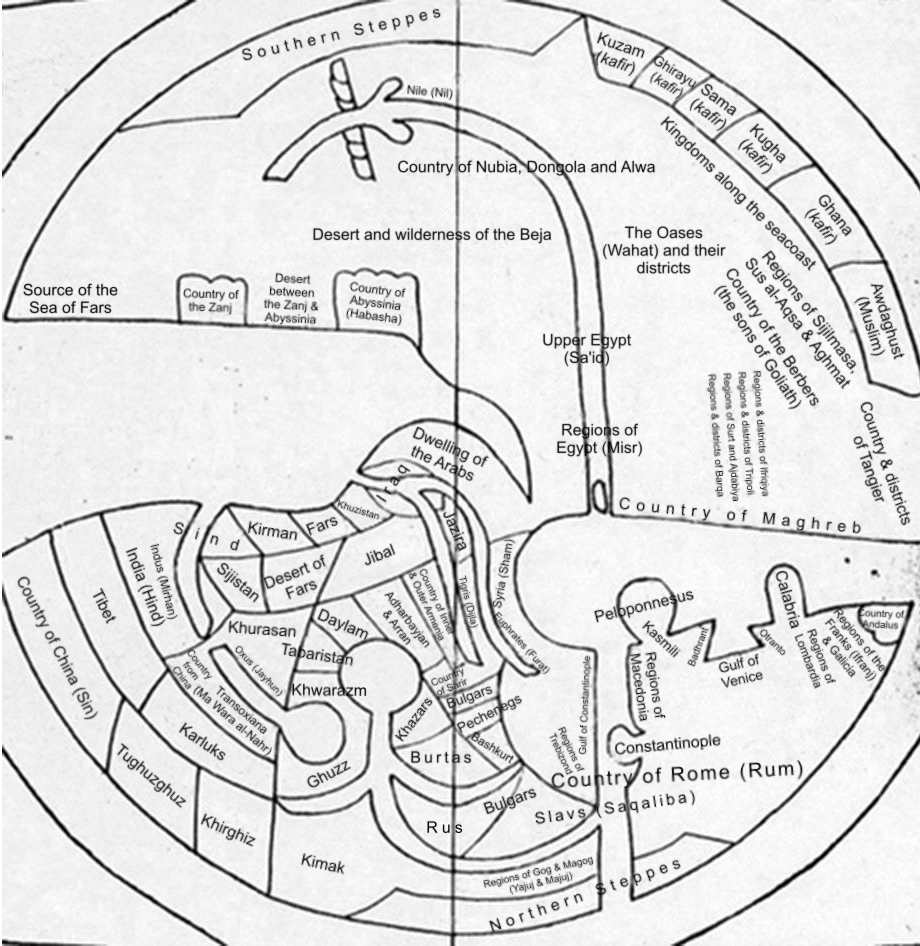
Ibn Hawqal's world map translated into English

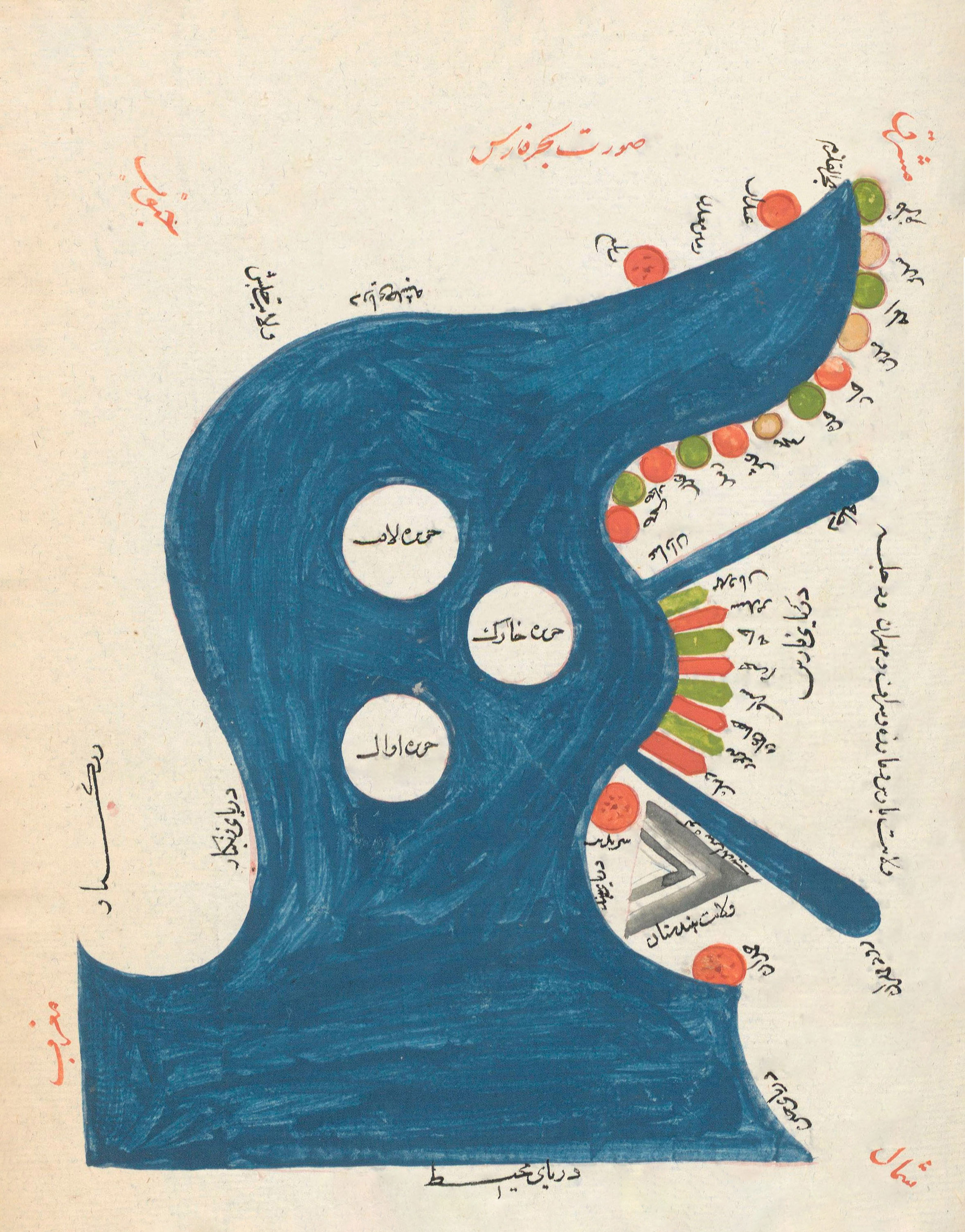
Map of the Persian Gulf from the Kitab al-Masalik wa'l-Mamalik by al-Istakhri (restored in 2018, Persian translation dated to the 14-15th century CE)

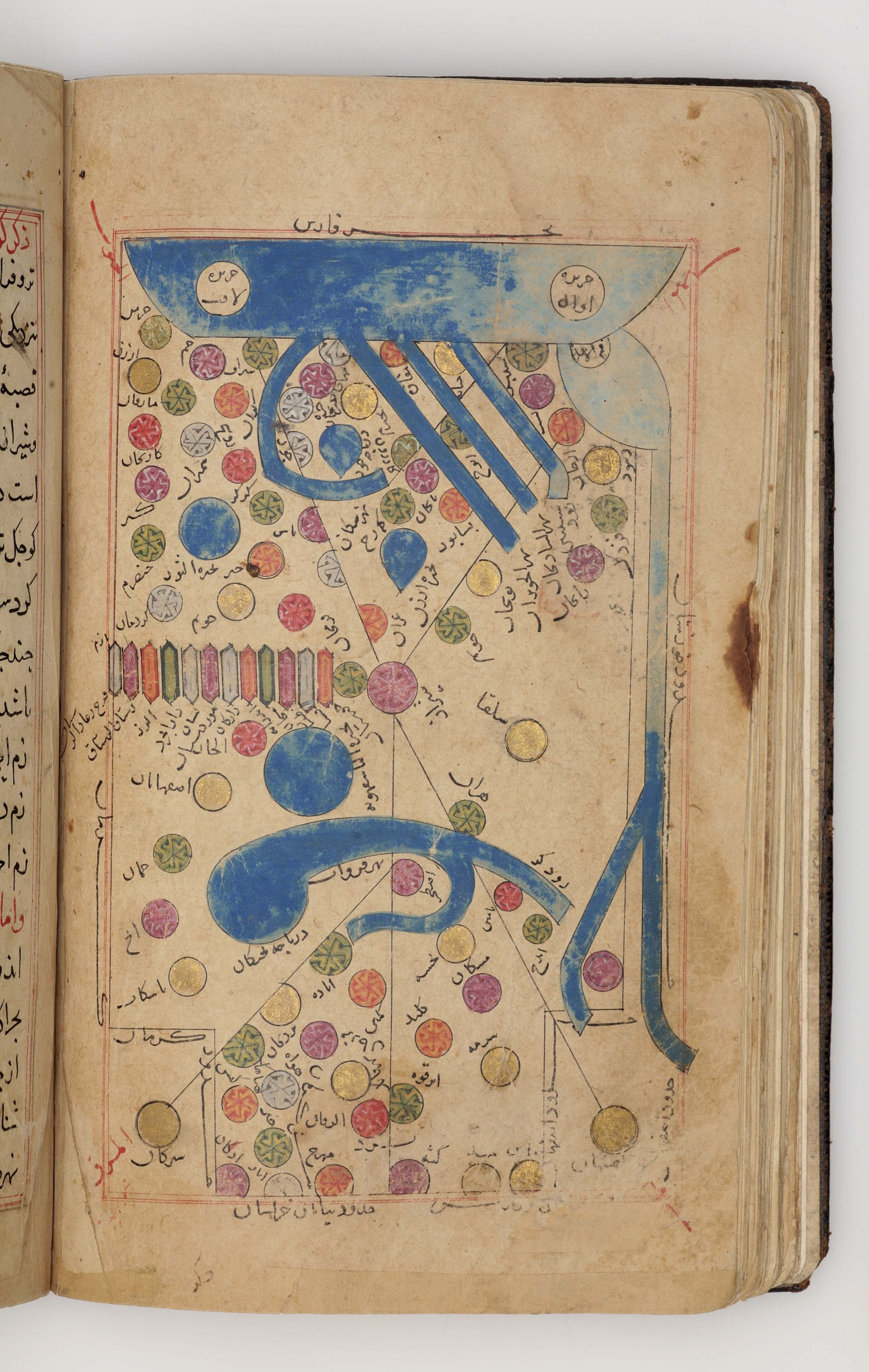
Map of Pars by al-Istakhri from folio 40b of the Khalili Collection of Islamic Art MSS 972 (dated to c. 1306 CE)

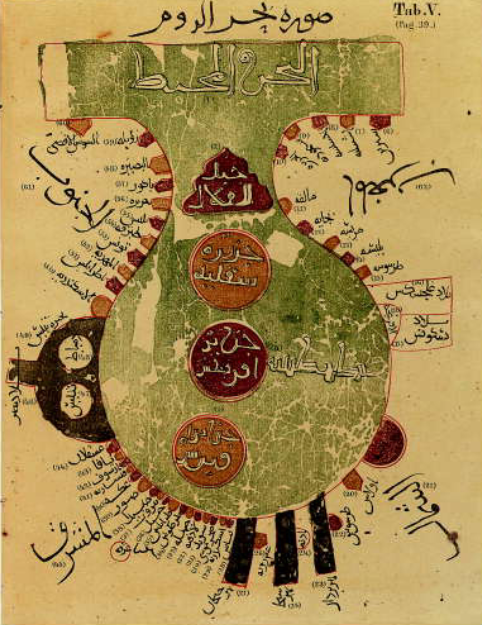
Istakhri's map of the Mediterranean, with Fraxinetum depicted as an island (West at top, copy dated to 1173)

== See also ==
- Geography and cartography in the medieval Islamic world
- Surat Al-Ard
