= Istakhri =

Geographer of Abbasid period

Abū Ishāk al-Fārisī al-Iṣṭakhrī
- Born: Istakhr
- Died: After 952; Baghdad

Academic background
- Influences: Al-Balkhi

Academic work
- Era: Islamic Golden Age
- School or tradition: Balkhi school
- Main interests: Islamic geography

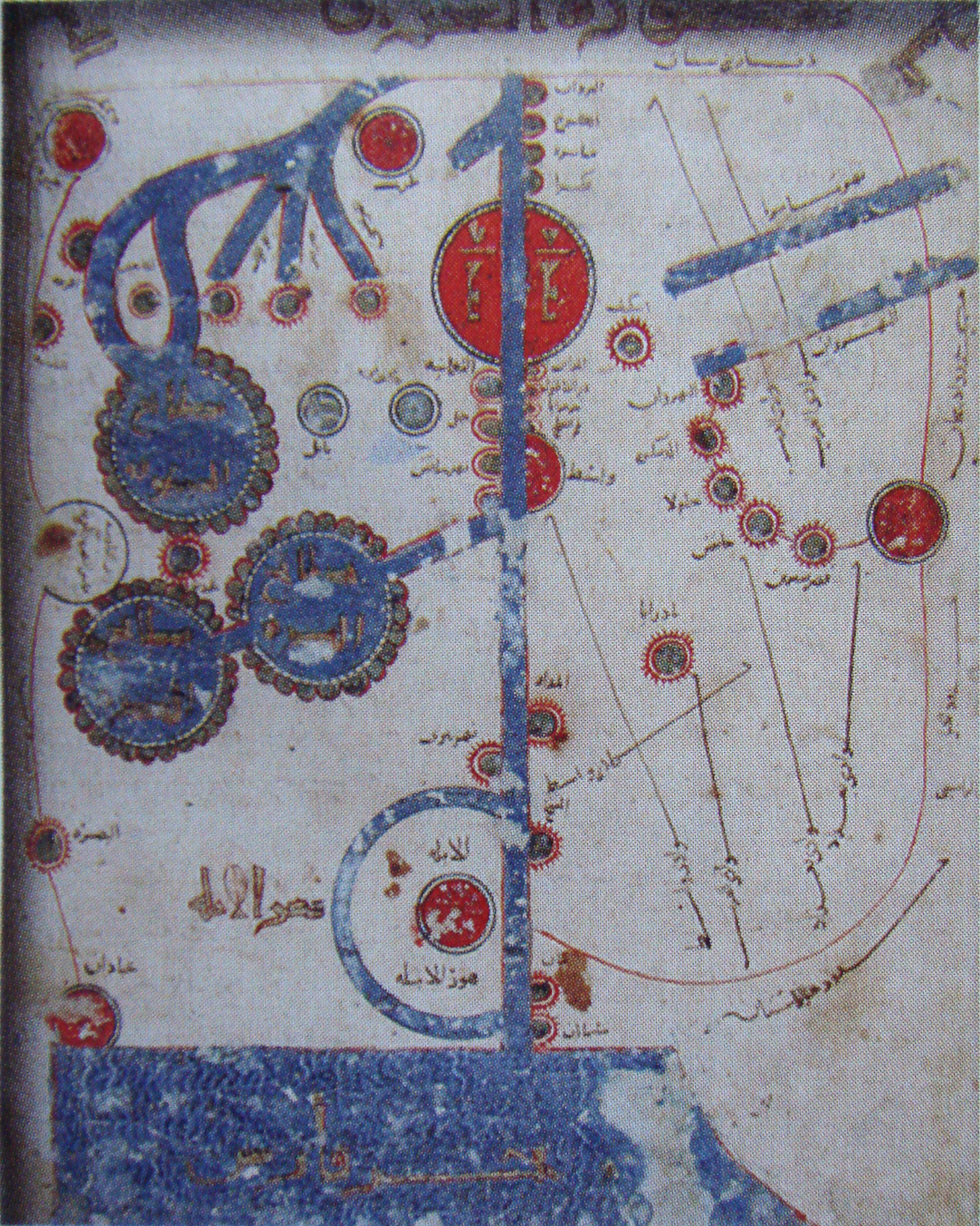
Istakhri's map, from the Book of Roads and Kingdoms

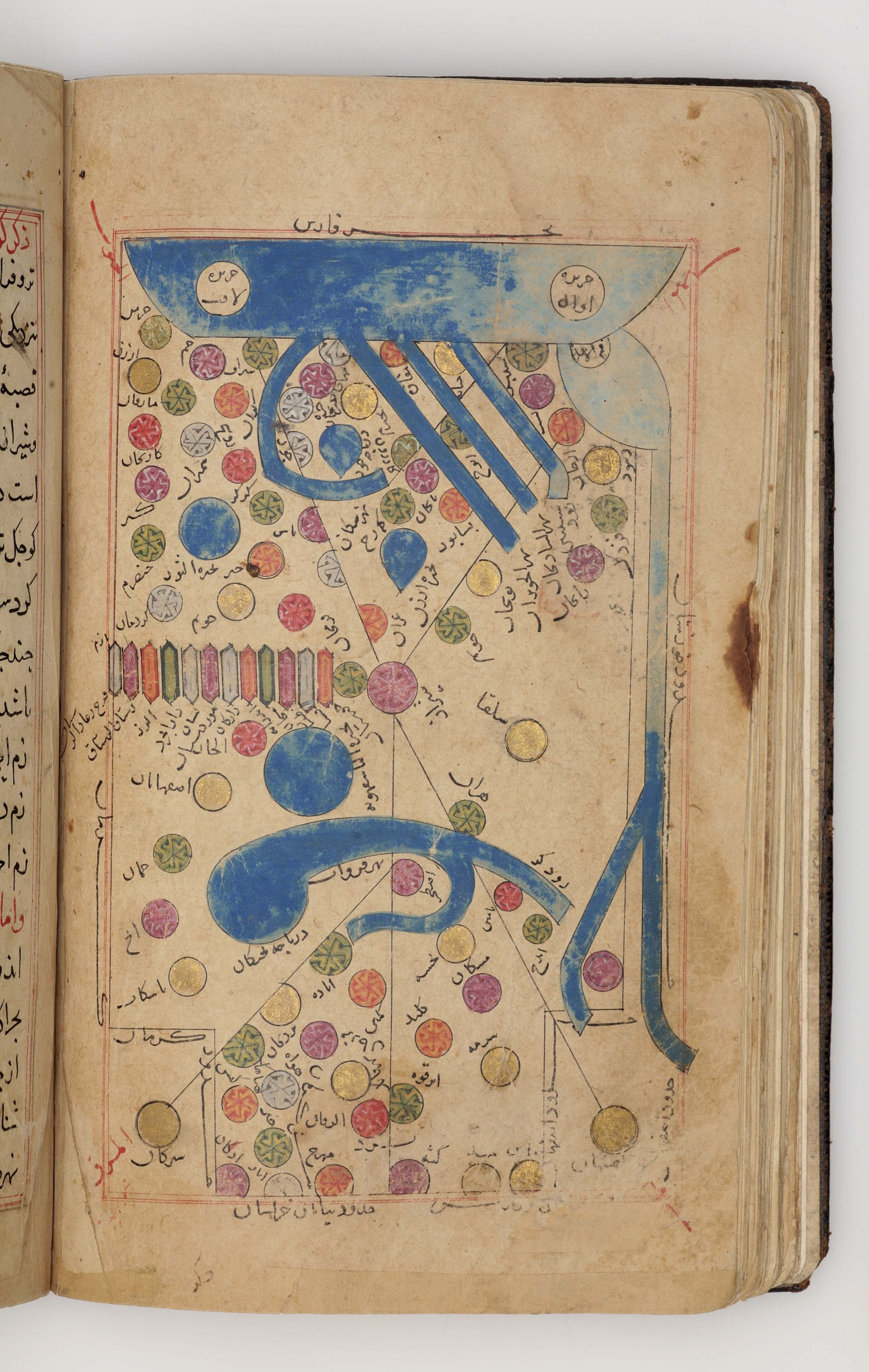
Map of Fars

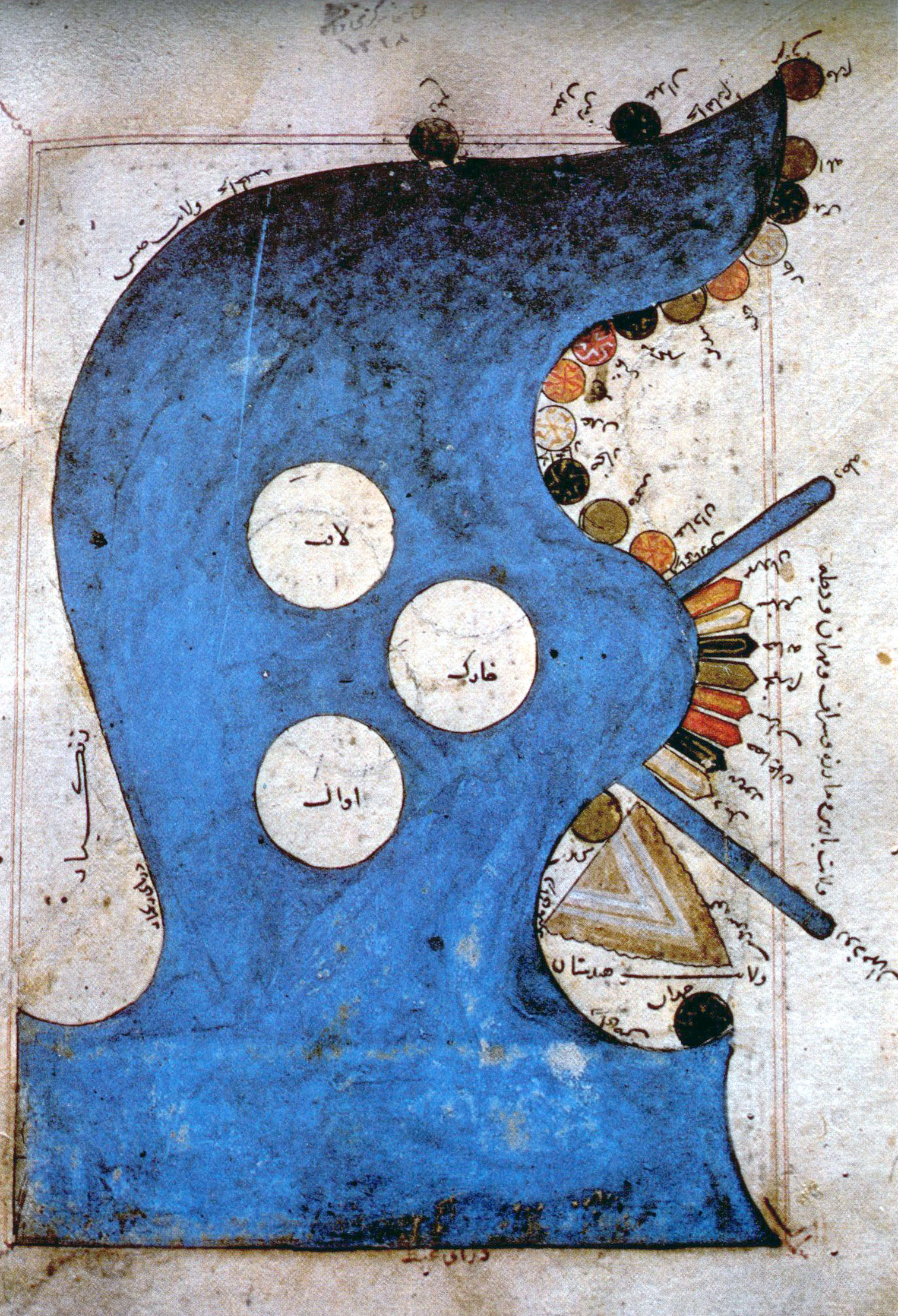
A map of the Persian Gulf by Istakhri

Abu Ishaq Ibrahim ibn Muhammad al-Farsi al-Istakhri (آبو إسحاق إبراهيم بن محمد الفارسي الإصطخري) (also Estakhri, Persian: استخری, i.e. from the Iranian city of Istakhr, b. – d. 346 AH/AD 957) was a 10th-century travel author and Islamic geographer who wrote valuable accounts in Arabic of the many Muslim territories he visited during the Abbasid era of the Islamic Golden Age. These accounts would include both maps and descriptions of the Muslim world he was discussing. Istakhri also belonged to the Balkhi school of cartography, which he helped to popularize. Istakhri's writing style was innovative for its addition of Islamic traditions throughout the text, and for its inclusion in conjunction with the maps he presented. Istakhri met the celebrated traveller-geographer Ibn Hawqal, while travelling, and Ibn Hawqal incorporated the work of Istakhri in his book Kitab al-Surat al-Ard.

== Life and background ==
It is believed that al-Istakhri is from the town of Istakahr, an ancient city in the southwestern province of Fars. There is no consensus regarding his origin. The Encyclopedia Iranica states, "Biographical data are very meager. From his nesbas (attributive names) he appears to have been a native of Eṣṭaḵr in Fārs, but it is not known whether he was Persian". Some sources describe him as Persian, while others state he was Arab. Most of his works were written in Arabic and then later translated to Persian. This translation possibly facilitated his works becoming an inspiration for other Persian geographers of the time. His seminal work, Kitab al-masalik wa-I-mamalik or Book of Roads and Kingdoms, was one of the earliest attempts at mapping a large area of land in the Islamic world.

== Works ==
Istakhri's two surviving works are:

- Masālik al-Mamālik (مسالك الممالك, Routes of the Realms), or Kitab al-masalik wa-l-mamalik (كتاب المسالك والممالك Book of Roads and Kingdoms), a contribution to the "Book of Roads and Kingdoms" tradition. This combines maps with descriptive text to describe the geography of Iran and surrounding kingdoms. It is based mainly on lists of stations of postal routes, and seems intended to help commit those lists to memory rather than to guide travellers through the territory. There is no consistency between the map projections. An illuminated manuscript (MS Or. 3101) dated AH 589 (AD 1193) is held by Leiden University Libraries and is digitally available. Another illuminated manuscript dated AH 706 (AD 1306–07) now resides in the Khalili Collection of Islamic Art. It contains many maps, though some mentioned in the text are missing.
- Ṣuwar al-ʿAqālīm (صور الاقاليم, Pictures of the Regions), A Persian treatise of geography. Thought to be a representation of Spain, the text included with the image refers to Spanish territory under the rule of the Umayyads of Cordoba. This gives a reference to the times of 756 CE - 1031 CE. While this image was innovative at the time of its creation, there are some incorrect locations and errors throughout.

== Historical context ==
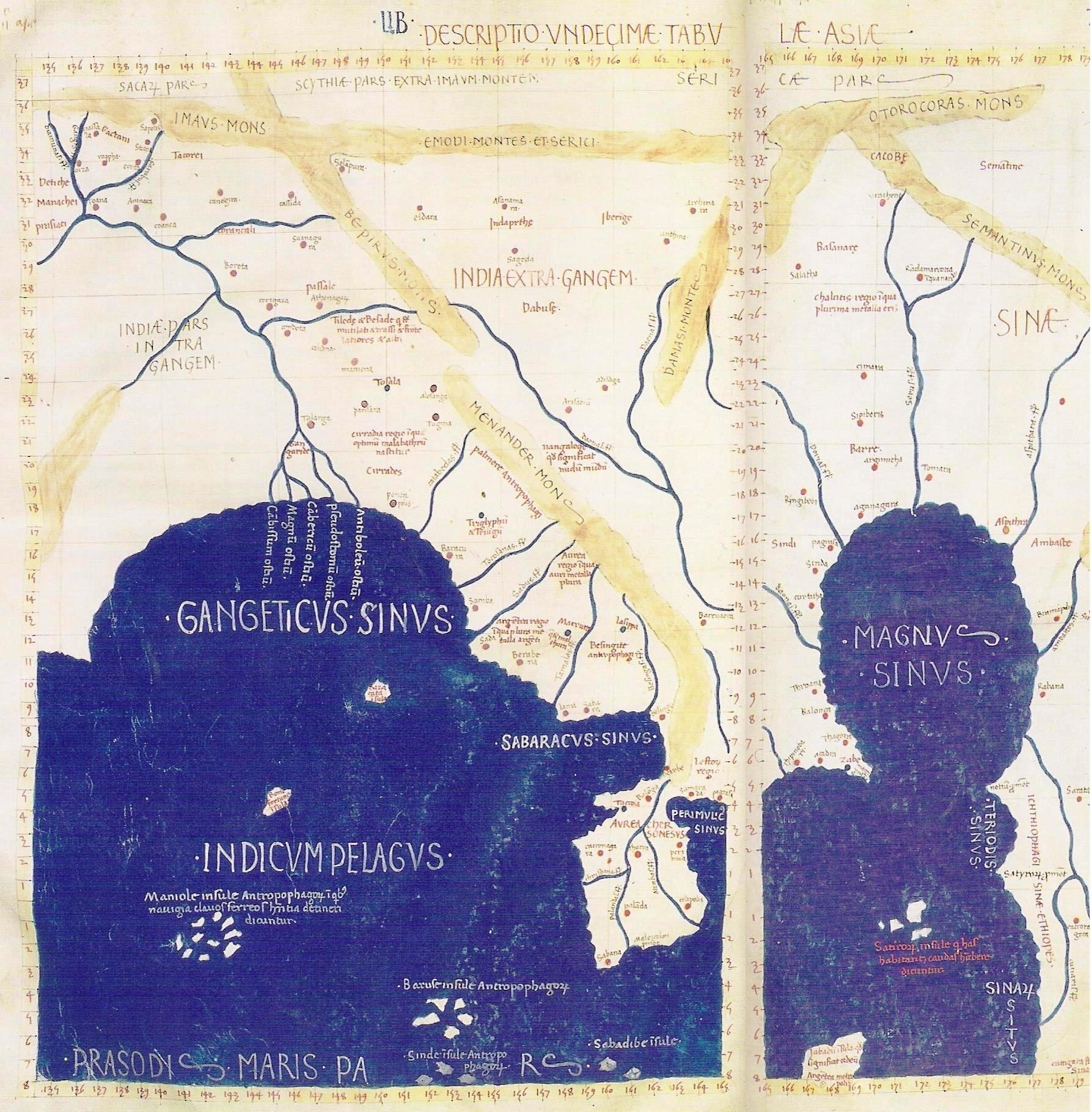
Ptolomy’s map, which inspired Islamic and European mapmakers, including Istakhri and al-Balkhi.

In the 9th century, around 150 years after the founding of Islam, Arabic translations of Ptolemy's Geography sparked Islamic interest in the literature of cartography and geographical descriptions. In addition, Arabic geographers utilized the ancient Iranian concept of the seven climes, a system which organized the world into broad regions and informed how Islamic scholars described space. The Abbasid period was increasingly concerned with cartographical improvement to address the needs of administrations and businesses as well as to be able to locate Mecca easily.

== The Balkhi tradition ==
Later Arabic cartographers shifted away from the Ptolemaic past to embrace new forms of symbolic mapping. Istakhri belonged to and helped to popularize the Balkhi school, inspired by the earlier works of Ibn Kurradadhbih and the Iraqi school. The Balkhi school was the first to focus on Islamic areas and leave foreign methods behind, instead defining a country in geographical terms. Map divisions were largely territorial and material; however, since few of al-Balkhi's geographical treatises survive, their influence on Istakhri has been long contested. Before 921 CE, Istakhri stated he had completed commentaries on Balkhi's maps and expanded upon them in 933 CE and 951 CE. Afterward, he met Ibn Hawqal, who revised Istakhri's work as well. As none of the existing manuscripts date from their lifetimes, it is difficult to fully know the origins of the Balkhi school and its various works.

== Manuscript tradition ==
While scholars have referred to the category of illustrated maps associated with al-Istakhri as the Atlas of Islam, some modern scholars like Karen Pinto prefer to call it the KMMS tradition. The acronym comes from the first letter of each word of the Arabic title of his Book of Roads and Kingdoms (Kitāb al-masālik wa-al-mamālik) combined with the first letter of the Arabic word for picture (ṣūrat). Istakhri methodically sections off regional entities that have boundaries and ascribes them to them certain political and religious meanings. In the illustrated geographies, Istakhri follows a standardized format: each manuscript includes 21 maps, one world map and 20 regional maps, arranged in the same fixed order. The text also briefly explains the world and theories about it, then narrows down to discussing the Muslim world in full.

Istakhri would oftentimes interweave Islamic traditions with the territory he was writing and mapping. He also wrote about places he had not yet seen, such as Sicily, Italy, by taking extensive notes from the geographical works of those who had been there and reading through previous works on the region. There are also personal anecdotes scattered throughout the text as well. Istakhri discusses how highly he held the values of the structure of the kingdom, good manners, law and order, and the organization of settled life, for example as seen through his writings on the Beja people.

== Cartographic method ==
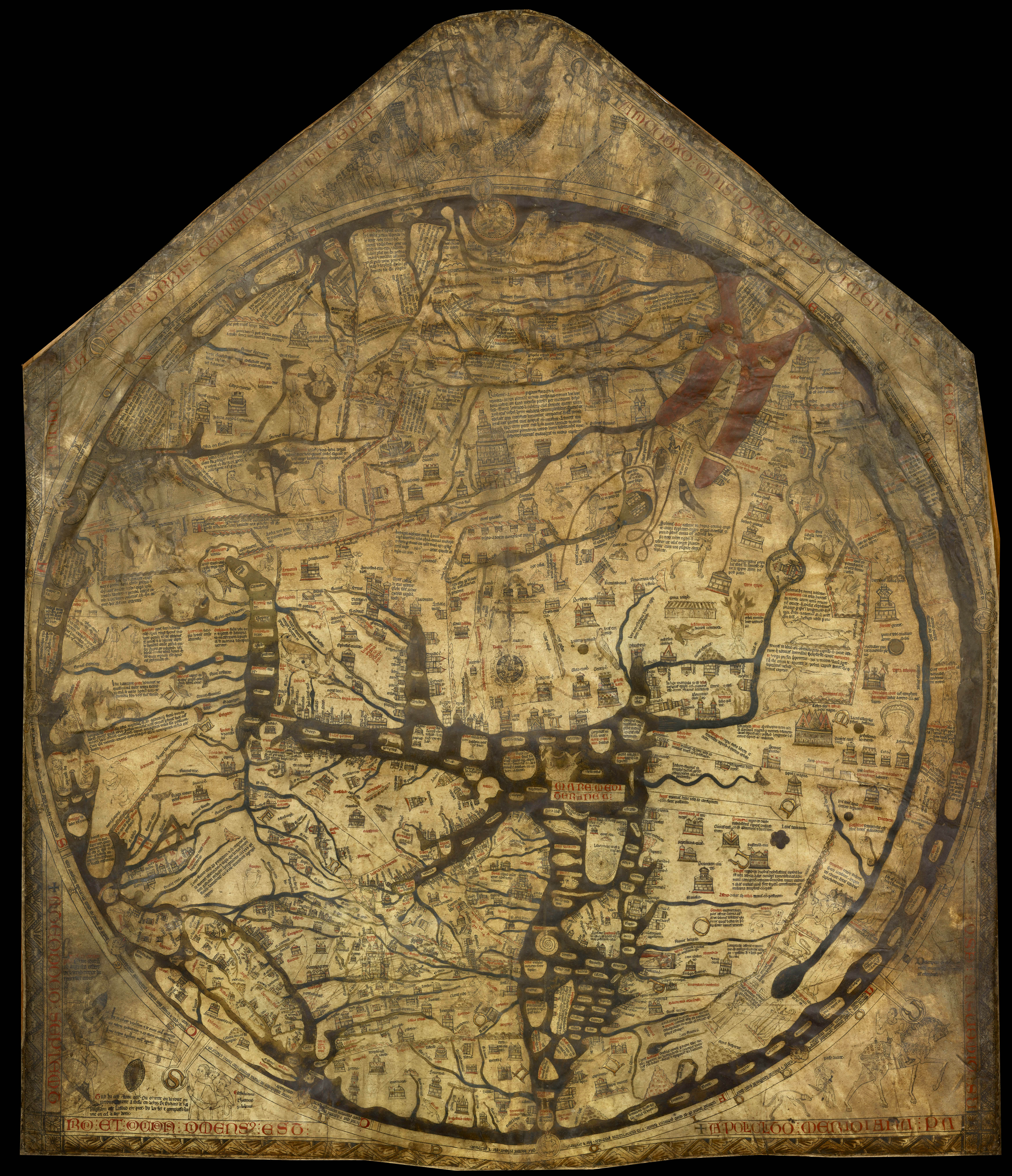
Mappae Mundi tradition, which bears similarities to Istakhri’s work with the surrounding ocean.

Istakhri's method of combining descriptive text with schematic visual aids was innovative for the time. His maps show a circular landmass of the world in a formless, surrounding ocean, similar to the Latin mappae mundi tradition. He orients the map with the south at the top and draws each Islamic region using shapes and colors; for example, rivers are dark brown and cities are depicted as circles and rectangles. He does not use a drawing scale like latitude and longitude but often maintains proper proportionality and directionality, with distance measured by the time taken to travel between locations. However, the surviving drawings differ by region in condition and thoroughness.

== Published editions ==
An 8-volume edition of works by medieval Arab geographers, edited by the Dutch orientalist Michael Jan de Goeje in a series titled Bibliotheca geographorum Arabicorum was published by Brill, Lugduni-Batavora (Leiden) in the 1870s. An edition of Istakhri's MS text was produced for the first volume under the Latin title Viae Regnorum descriptio ditionis Moslemicae – "Description of Roads of the Kingdoms in Muslim territories". In 1927, the editor Theodore Noldeke produced a second edition. In 1845, the German orientalist A. D. Mordtmann published a translation in Hamburg with the title Das Buch der Länder von Schech Ebu Ishak el Farsi el Isztachri, with a foreword by C. Ritter. (Schriften der Akademie von Ham Bd. 1, Abth. 2).

== See also ==
- Ibn Hawqal
- Al-Maqdisi
- Ibn al-Faqih
- Qudama ibn Ja'far
- Ibn Khordadbeh
- Ibn Rustah
- Al-Ya'qubi
- Al-Masudi
- List of Iranian scientists
- Surat Al-Ard

== Sources ==
- Bolshakov, O. G. (1998). "EṢṬAḴRĪ, ABŪ ESḤĀQ EBRĀHĪM". Encyclopaedia Iranica, Vol. VIII, Fasc. 6. pp. 646–647.
- Bosworth, Clifford Edmund (1989). "al-Masālik wa'l-Mamālik". The Encyclopedia of Islam, Volume 6. Leiden: E. J. Brill. pp. 639-640.
- de Goeje, M.J., ed. (1927). Bibliotheca Geographorum Arabicorum (1927), vol 1: Viae Regnorum descriptio ditionis Moslemicae auctore Abu Ishák al-Fárisí al-Istakhrí (in Arabic). Leden: E. J. Brill.
- Ouseley, William, ed. (1800). The oriental geography of Ebn Haukal, an Arabian traveller of the tenth century. London. – Note: in fact, it is a work by Istakhri
- Al-Istakhri, Abu Ishaq Ibrahim ibn Muhammad (1927), Goeje, M. J. de; Noldeke, Theodore (eds.), "Viae Regnorum descriptio ditionis Moslemicae auctore Abū Ishāk al-Fārisi al-Istakhri", Bibliotheca Geographorum Arabicorum (in Arabic and Latin), 1 (2 ed.), Lugdunum Batavorum (Leiden): Brill publishers
- Ibn Haukal (1873), Goeje, M. J. de (ed.), "Viae et regna, descriptio ditionis moslemicae auctore Abu'l-Kasim Ibn Haukal", Bibliotheca Geographorum Arabicorum (in Arabic and Latin), 2, Lugdunum Batavorum (Leiden): Brill publishers
- Goeje, M. J. de, ed. (1870), "Indices, glossarium et addenda et emendanda ad Part I-III", Bibliotheca Geographorum Arabicorum (in Arabic and Latin), 4, Lugdunum Batavorum (Leiden): Brill
- Das Buch der Länder von Schech Ebu Ishak el Farsi el Isztachri, translated by Mordtmann, Andreas David, Frankfurt/M.: Rauhen Hauses in Horn, 1995 [1845]
