= Antonino Scaravilli =

Italian anti-fascist partisan

- Born: Antonino Scaravilli; 17 March 1917; Cesarò, Sicily, Italy
- Died: 20 October 1944; Bologna, Italy
- Organization: Giustizia e Libertà
- Known for: Partisan; the Battle of the University (Bologna)
- Awards: Honorary degree in law (Posthumous)

Antonino Scaravilli (17 March 1917 – 20 October 1944) was a partisan who took part in the Italian Resistance during the Second World War, joining the anti-fascist movement after the 1943 armistice. He was captured and executed by Fascist forces during fighting at the University. Scaravilli is remembered as a symbol of young Italians, and a central square at the University of Bologna has been named in his honour.

== Biography ==
Born in Cesarò, Sicily, to Vito and Maria Scaravilli. After completing his classical studies, he enrolled in the Faculty of Law at the University of Bologna in 1942. He was the youngest member of a large family. Recalled to military service during the Second World War, he deserted and joined the Resistance.

He is officially recognised as a partisan from 1 October 1943 to 20 October 1944.

== Battle of the University ==
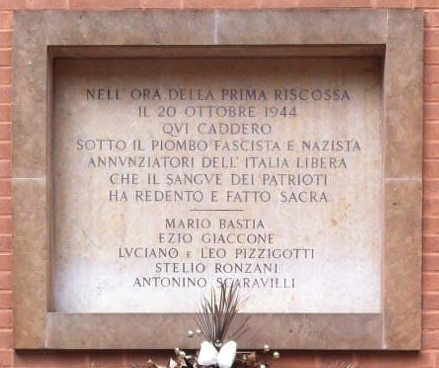
Plaque commemorating the partisans killed in the Battle of the University (Bologna)

In the autumn of 1944, while Bologna awaited liberation, Scaravilli helped organise partisan bases in the city centre. He was a member of the 8th GL “Masia” Brigade (formerly the 5th GL Brigade of Emilia-Romagna), which had established its main base at the University's Geography Institute. There, clandestine radios were installed to communicate with the command and Allied missions, and caches of weapons, provisions, and materials for forged documents were prepared.

On 20 October 1944, a large deployment of approximately 200 fascist militiamen surrounded the university headquarters. A violent clash ensued; many partisans managed to escape, but Antonino and some comrades were trapped inside. After a prolonged battle, they were captured and soon executed together: Antonino with Mario Bastia, Ezio Giaccone, the brothers Leo and Luciano Pizzigotti, and Stelio Ronzani.

Shortly afterwards, the city of Bologna rose in the Battle of Porta Lame, continuing the struggle to which Scaravilli and his comrades had sacrificed their lives.

== Honours and legacy ==
Piazza Antonino Scaravilli, a square in Bologna, is named after him, and lies opposite Palazzo Poggi, the University's main building.

Inside the Rectorate, at Via Zamboni 33, along the corridor leading to the exit on Via S. Giacomo, there is a commemorative plaque.

He was posthumously awarded an Honorary Degree (Laurea Honoris Causa) in Law on 7 December 1946.

He is buried in the Ossuary Monument to the Fallen Partisans at the Certosa Cemetery in Bologna and is commemorated in the Memorial Shrine in Piazza Nettuno, in the center of Bologna.

== Bibliography ==
- Nazario Sauro Onofri. "Bologna dall'antifascismo alla Resistenza" [Bologna from Anti-Fascism to the Resistance]. Gli antifascisti, i partigiani e le vittime del fascismo nel bolognese, 1919-1945 [Anti-Fascists, Partisans, and Victims of Fascism in the Bologna Area, 1919–1945]. By Albertazzi, A.; Arbizzani, L.; Onofri, N.S. (in Italian). Vol. I.
- Gina Fasoli (1995). "20 Ottobre 1944: si spara all'Ateneo" [20 October 1944: Shots Fired at the University]. Resistenza Oggi [Resistance Today] (in Italian): 137–140.
- "Cattura di un gruppo organizzato di pericolosi «fuori-legge»" [Capture of an Organised Group of Dangerous ‘Outlaws’]. il Resto del Carlino (in Italian). 24 October 1944. p. 2.
