= Massif des Maures =

Mountain range in southeastern France

Coordinates: 43.2800°N 6.3847°E

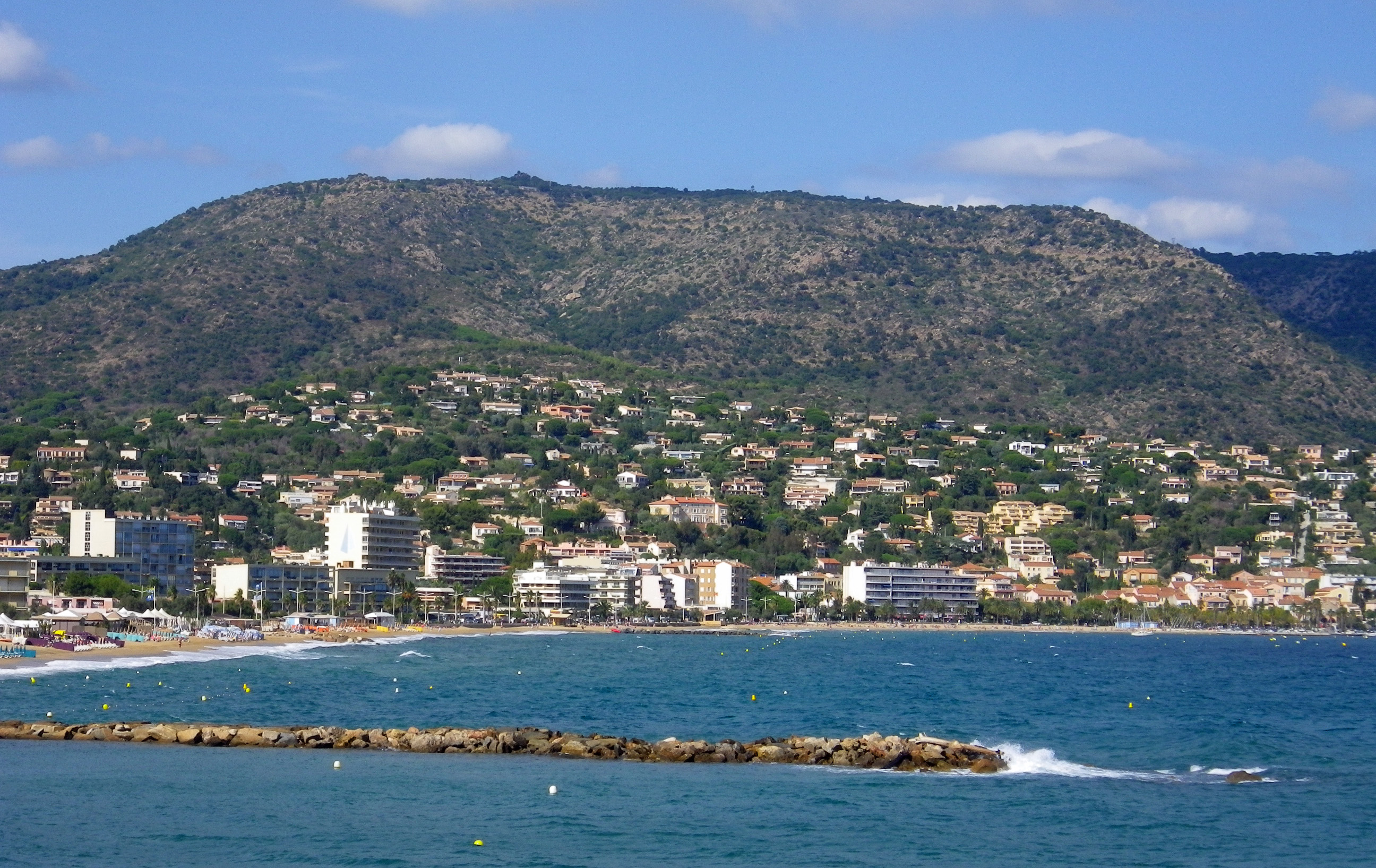
Massif des Maures in Le Lavandou.

The Massif des Maures (French: [ma.sif de moʁ], "plateau of the Moors") is a small mountain range in southeastern France. It is located in the department of Var, near Fraxinet and between Hyères and Fréjus. Its highest point, at Signal de la Sauvette, is 780 m (2,559 ft) high.

== Geography ==
The Massif des Maures is a low mountain range about 56 km (35 mi) long and 16 km (10 mi) wide. Its highest point is 780 m (2,560 ft) high. It lies between the River Argens and the River Réal Martin to the north and the Mediterranean coast to the south, the River Durance to the west and the foothills of the Alps to the east, between Hyères and Fréjus. The winters are mild and the amounts of precipitation are low, especially in the summer when many of the streams run dry. The sides of the hills are steep, the soil is thin and there are few settlements; cultivated crops include grapes, citrus, olives, figs, mulberries and almonds.

The detailed geography of the massif is complex; it is arranged along three main ridge lines, oriented west/southwest to east/northeast, the maximum altitudes of which decrease from north to south. The most northerly ridge carries at its western end the highest points of the massif: the Signal de la Sauvette 780 m (2,559 ft) and Notre-Dame-des-Anges 767 m (2,516 ft) peaks. Further south, an intermediate ridge culminates at 648 m (2,126 ft) not far from the Chartreuse de la Verne. Finally, the coastal link reaches only 528 m (1,732 ft) above Cavalaire-sur-Mer.

== Flora and fauna ==
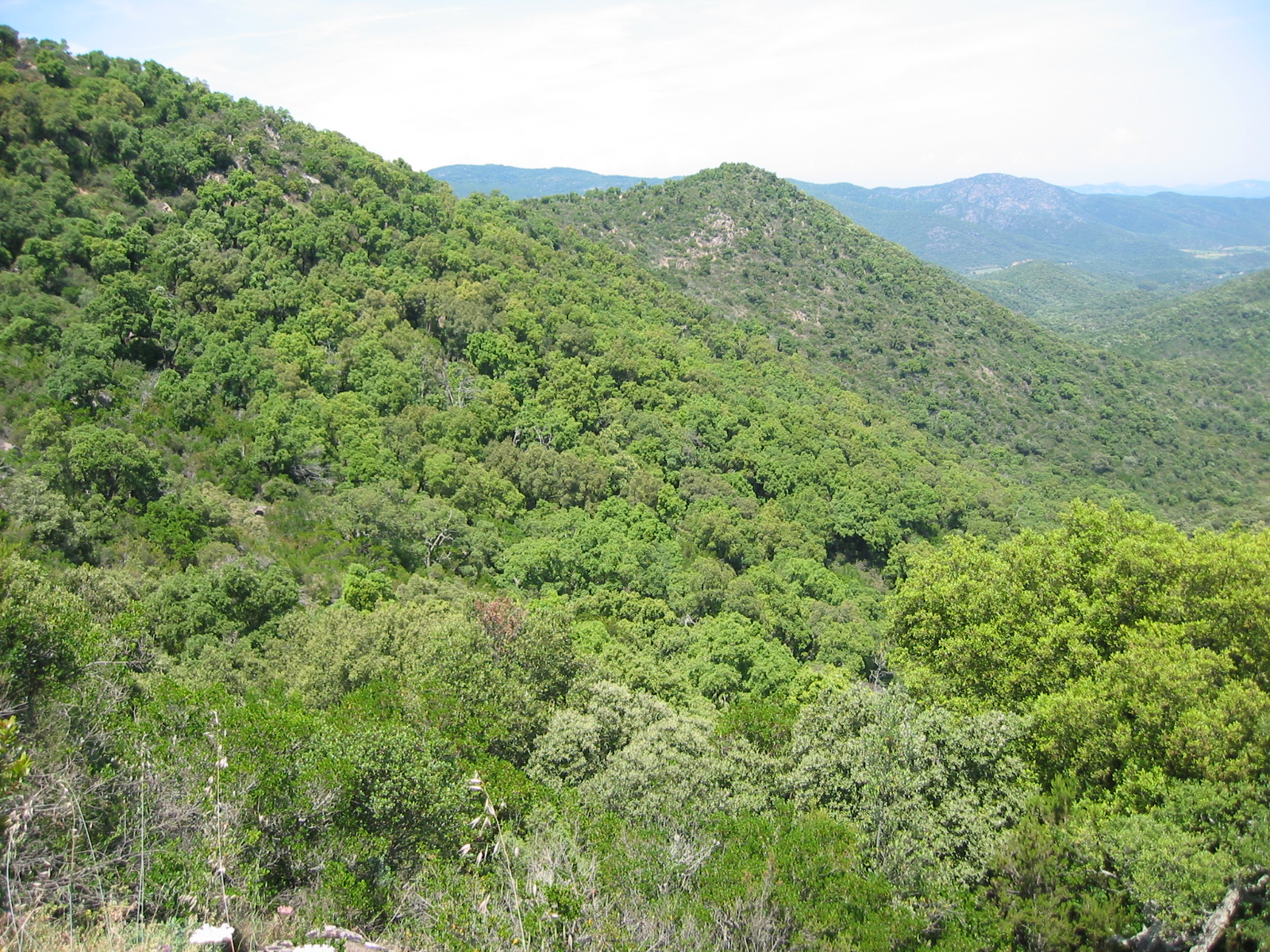
Forest on the Massif des Maures in July

The massif is densely vegetated with an evergreen forest dominated by cork oak, holm oak, holly sweet chestnut and strawberry trees. On the highest ridges Aleppo pine and stone pine flourish.

Since the early 21st century, there have been more frequent destructive wildfires, but the cork oak is particularly resistant to these; the thick bark protects the trunk and new shoots grow from the blackened branches. Shrubs present on the forest floor include myrtle, juniper, boxwood, broom, heather, rosemary and Spanish lavender.

This is one of the last places in Europe where Hermann's tortoise can be found. Other reptiles include European green lizard, ocellated lizard, grass snake, adder and Aesculapian snake. In thick parts of the forest, wild boar are attracted by the acorns and chestnuts, while deer, badgers, foxes, squirrels and the occasional hare roam among the trees. Birds of prey include short-toed snake eagle, as well as Eurasian eagle-owl, tawny owl and little owl.

== See also ==
- Massif de l'Esterel
- Umayyad invasion of Gaul
