= Battle of Tourtour =

973 defeat of Andalusi settlers in Provence, France

Coordinates: 43°19′3″N 6°28′12″E

The Battle of Tourtour of 973 was a significant victory for the Christian forces of William I of Provence over the Andalusi raiders based at Fraxinetum.

== Background ==
For decades, the Saracens had been making inroads into Provence, building several fortresses, the greatest of which was at Fraxinetum, the castle of La Garde-Freinet. From these bases, they raided and pillaged, capturing goods and people to be sold in far-off Muslim ports. Though they resisted strongly at first, soon the Provençals settled down to a more passive resistance.

== Capture of the Abbot of Cluny ==
However, early in 973, the Saracens captured Maïeul, Abbot of Cluny, and demanded a ransom. Much venerated by his monks, his ransom was quickly obtained. The monks responded, however, once their abbot was released, by stirring up a fury in Provence against the Andalusi menace. The peasantry and the nobles were united in their antipathy towards the Andalusis and together implored their ruler, Count William, to act against them.

== William's response ==
William, equally disturbed by the treatment of the abbot, raised a feudal host and took to the offensive. His army consisted not only of men from Provence, but also the lower Dauphiné and Nice.

William's strategy was simple: he struck at the heart of Saracen Provence with the whole of his force. This did not go unnoticed by Andalusi, who went out to meet the Provençals in the Alps. They were defeated in a series of five battles at Embrun, Gap, Riez, Ampus, and Cabasse. Thoroughly beaten back, the Saracens assembled in an open plain called Tourtour not far from Fraxinetum. There, the sixth and final battle of the war was fought. William defeated the Andalusis in the field and chased them back to Fraxinetum, where they sheltered while the Provençals rested.

After a brief break from campaigning, William made an assault on Fraxinetum. This attack was led by the lords of Levens, Aspremont, Gilette, Beuil, and Sospel. With La Garde-Freinet taken, the Andalusis were cut off in Fraxinetum, which was soon seized. The remainder of the Muslim army fled to a nearby forest, where they were soon overcome and entirely captured or killed.

== Aftermath ==
La Garde-Freinet was razed to the ground. Surviving Andalusis were baptized and made to work as slaves. All remaining Muslims in Provence quickly departed by ship without waiting for any further reprisals.

For this campaign and its success at expelling all the Andalusis from Provence, William was called "the Liberator" and "Pater Patriae".
