= Fraxinetum =

10th-century fortress near Saint-Tropez, Provence

Coordinates: 43°19′17″N 06°27′50″E

Map of known incursions from Fraxinetum (in green)

Fraxinetum or Fraxinet (Arabic: فرخشنيط, romanized: Farakhshanīt or فرخشة Farakhsha, from Latin fraxinus: "ash tree", fraxinetum: "ash forest") was the site of a Muslim stronghold at the centre of a frontier state in Provence between about 887 and 972. It is identified with modern La Garde-Freinet, near Saint-Tropez. The fortress was established by Muslims from al-Andalus. From this base, the Muslims raided up the Rhône Valley, into Piedmont and as far as the Abbey of Saint Gall within present-day Switzerland. Their main business was slave-raiding of Europeans for export to Islamic markets. For a time, they controlled passes through the Western Alps. They withstood several attempts to oust them, but were finally defeated by the combined forces of the Provençal and Piedmontese nobility at the battle of Tourtour in 972.

== Primary sources ==
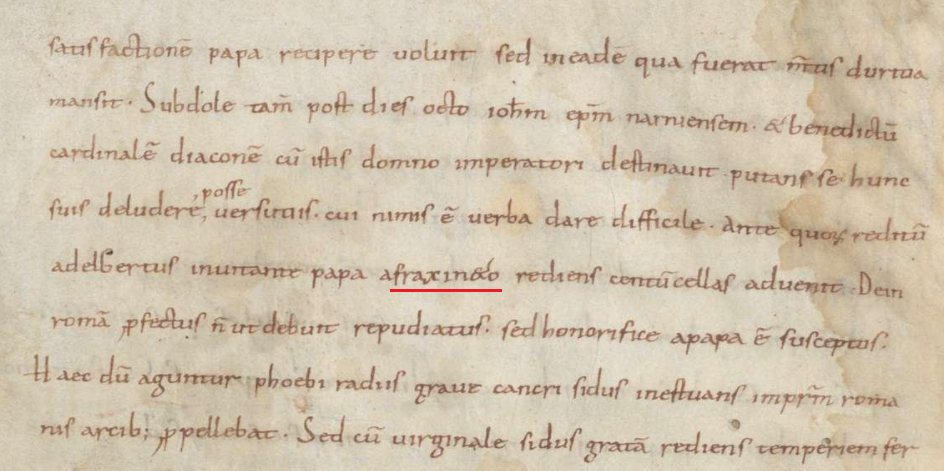
Liudprand mentioning Fraxinetum (underlined)

Christian sources in Latin are more numerous than Muslim ones in Arabic for reconstructing the history of Fraxinetum. The most important contemporary narrative of the Muslims of Fraxinetum is the Antapodosis of Liudprand, bishop of Cremona (d. 972). The bishop also mentions Fraxinetum in his Liber de rebus gestis Ottonis, an account of the reign of King Otto I of Germany. Other contemporary narrative sources in Latin are the Annales of Flodoard, which cover the years 919–966, and the Casus sancti Galli of Ekkehard (d. 973). Documentary sources are few, but the first cartulary of the Abbey of Saint-Victor at Marseille, covering the years 838–1000, contains some references in its charters to Fraxinetum.

Several biographies and saints' lives also contain information relative to Fraxinetum. The Vita Iohannis Gorziensis, a biography of John of Gorze written around 960, contains an account of the diplomacy undertaken by Otto I in response to raids in his territory. The two Vitae sancti Maioli, biographies of Maiolus of Cluny written by Odilo of Cluny and Syrus, are important sources for the capture of their subject, which event brought about the downfall of Fraxinetum. The anonymous Vita sancti Bobonis, written in the first half of the eleventh century about a saint who died in 986, describes the downfall of Fraxinetum. Its account appears to be based on that of the destruction of a castrum Fraxenedellum in the Chronicon Novalicense.

Among contemporary Muslim sources that mention Fraxinetum are the Arabic Ṣurāt al-Arḍ of Ibn Ḥawqal (977), which is a revised version of the geographical treatise Kitāb al-Masālik waʿl-mamālik by al-Iṣṭakhrī (951), and an anonymous Persian geography, Ḥudūd al-ʿĀlam (late 10th century). The Muqtabis of Ibn Ḥayyān (d. 1076) also mentions Fraxinetum.

== Location ==
Fraxinetum in its Mediterranean context, with the Muslim world in green and the Byzantine empire in purple.

The fort of Fraxinetum atop the hill Mont des Maures overlooking what is today the village of La Garde-Freinet had existed since the Roman era. Its name is derived from the Latin fraxinus (ash tree) and probably refers to the thick forest of ash that covers the hill. The Muslim geographers al-Iṣṭakhrī and Ibn Ḥawqal call Fraxinetum Jabal al-Qilāl ("mount of timber"). They describe the Muslim enclave as vast, covered with streams and fertile soil and taking two days to cross. Ibn Ḥawqal erroneously considered it an island at the mouth of the Rhône.

== Identity ==
Kees Versteegh characterizes the region as being under the control of Arab groups based along the coast near Saint-Tropez, who exercised influence across parts of southern France and the western Alpine regions. Most contemporary Latin sources referred to these groups as "Saracens". Mohammad Ballan characterizes them as Andalusīs or Muslims, not necessarily Arabs or Berbers.

According to Ibn Ḥawqal, the settlement was dependent on the Umayyad caliphate of Córdoba. The Muslims of Fraxinetum are described by Liudprand as Saracens (saraceni) from Spain and by the Vita sancti Bobonis simply as Spaniards (hispanicolae). According to Évariste Lévi-Provençal, the Saracen crews described by Liudprand were probably a mix of Arabs, Berbers, muwalladūn and perhaps Christians. Latin sources referred to them by various ethnonyms, usually Saracens, but sometimes Moors and even fusci (blacks), pagani (heathen) or Hagarenes. Manfred Wenner concludes, on the basis that all the sources trace the origins of Fraxinetum to Spain and some mention Africa, that the majority of soldiers in Fraxinetum were likely Berbers.

According to historian Mohammad Ballan, Fraxinetum was not just a settlement, but a frontier state that was regionally important economically and militarily.

== History ==
=== Background ===
In 838, the Annales Bertiniani record that Muslims raided Marseille, plundered its religious houses and took captive both men and women, clerical and lay, as slaves. In 842, the Annales report a raid in the vicinity of Arles. In 869, raiders returned to Arles and captured the archbishop, Roland. They accepted a ransom in return for the archbishop, but when they handed him over he was already dead. The construction of a castle in the Camargue following these raids up the Rhône may have induced raiders to try points further east, culminating in the establishment of a permanent base of operations at Fraxinetum.

=== Foundation and expansion ===
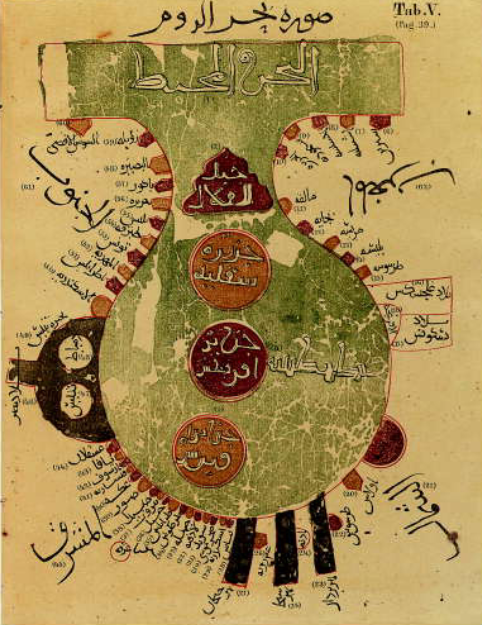
A 12th-century copy of a schematic contemporary Arabic map by al-Iṣṭakhrī depicts Jabal al-Qilāl as a triangular island (top centre) at the western end of the Mediterranean. The map is oriented west up.

The Muslim occupation of Fraxinetum began around 887, according to Liudprand, when a small ship carrying about twenty Andalusī sailors landed near Saint-Tropez. The Andalusīs seized the settlement that had grown up at the foot of the hill and then took control of the fort itself. This was accessible only by a narrow path through the forest, according to both Liudprand and Ibn Ḥawqal.

According to Liudprand, the settlers sent messages back to Spain and the Balearics inviting reinforcements. About 100 warriors answered the call, motivated both by religious zeal and a desire for plunder. In the first two decades of their rule, the Muslims of Fraxinetum subdued Provence and began raiding across the Alps into Italy. Liudprand blamed their quick success on the divisions and squabbles of the Provençals following the collapses of Carolingian authority. By 906, they controlled the pass of Mont Cenis between Provence and Italy. In that year, they attacked or occupied Acqui, Oulx and Susa in Italy. According to the 11th-century Chronicon Novalicense, they threatened the Abbey of Novalesa on this occasion. By 911, they were in control of all the western Alpine passes, from which they could collect tolls on traders and pilgrims. Between 915 and 918, they raided Embrun, Maurienne and Vienne. In 920, there were more attacks in Italy and on Marseille and Aix-en-Provence in western Provence.

Between 929 and 933, the Muslims of Fraxinetum extended their control to the more easterly Alpine passes and raided the Upper Rhône Valley. In 939, crossing the Alps again, they attacked the Abbey of Saint Gall and razed the Abbey of Saint-Maurice d'Agaune within present-day Switzerland. During these years they also incurred into western Austria and Liechtenstein. Like the contemporary Vikings, the Muslim raiders targeted monasteries because of their wealth and lack of defences.

=== Slave trade ===
Fraxinetum became a part of the al-Andalus slave trade. The population fled in fear of the slave raids, which made it difficult for the Frankish to secure their Southern coast, and the Saracens of Fraxinetum exported the Frankish prisoners they captured as slaves to the slave market of the Muslim Middle East.

=== High point ===
Men from Fraxinetum may have participated in the Fatimid raid on Genoa in 935. They certainly destroyed the port of Fréjus in 940, prompting a response from King Hugh of Italy. In 941 or 942, he sought an alliance with the Byzantine Empire and received a favourable response from the Emperor Romanos Lekapenos. To seal the alliance, Hugh's daughter Bertha was married to Romanos's grandson, Romanos II. While Hugh attacked Fraxinetum by land, a fleet of Byzantine chelandia destroyed the Muslim ships with Greek fire. The base for Byzantine operations was probably Sardinia. At the moment when Fraxinetum on the cusp of surrender, Hugh received news that a rival for the Italian throne, Margrave Berengar of Ivrea, was preparing to invade Italy with an army of Saxons from his exile in Germany. Hugh called off the siege and made an arrangement with the Muslims. They were allowed to keep the Alpine passes, presumably in exchange for defending the Italian frontier. It is possible that Hugh's abrupt change of policy was also related to the commercial relations he opened up with the Umayyad caliphate around the same time. In any case, Hugh's decision was condemned by contemporary Christian writers. Liudprand blamed him for the death of hundreds or even thousands of Christians. In the decade of the 940s, Fraxinetum was at the apex of its power and gave shelter to a number of Christian rebels. After his downfall in 962, King Adalbert of Italy took refuge in Fraxinetum. In his Annals, under the year 951, Flodoard of Reims records that "the Saracens occupying the Alpine passes extract tribute from travellers to Rome, only thus allowing them to pass."

Around 954, Fraxinetum came into conflict with Hungarian invaders. King Conrad of Burgundy took advantage of the conflict to slaughter both sides. The major defeat dealt to the Hungarians by King Otto I of Germany at the Battle of Lechfeld the following year allowed the German king to focus on the threat from Fraxinetum. At one point a military expedition may have been planned, but it never took place. This did not stop Widukind of Corvey from listing the Saracens among Otto's defeated enemies.

=== Decline and defeat ===
In 956, an incursion into the Upper Rhine Valley prompted Otto I to send an embassy to the Umayyad court, which he clearly believed had the power to control Fraxinetum. Ballan calls their raid deep into Otto's territory "their first major miscalculation". Several embassies were exchanged between the two most powerful courts in western Europe. After this, material aid from Spain to Fraxinetum declined substantially.

In 972, the Muslims captured Abbot Maiolus of Cluny while he was crossing the Alps and held him for ransom. After his release, Maiolus organized a military response. Led by Count William I of Provence and Count Arduin of Turin, a Christian force drawn from Provence, Piedmont and Septimania defeated the Muslims in the battle of Tourtour in the summer of 972. Fraxinetum fell by the end of the year after a short siege.

With the fall of Fraxinetum, those Muslims who did not go into exile were either killed or sold into slavery. Many converted to Christianity and remained in Provence as serfs, while the formerly Muslim lands were parcelled out among the victorious Provençal nobles.

== Governance ==
The Muslims of Fraxinetum established forts throughout the areas they conquered in Provence and Piedmont, but Latin sources do not distinguish them, calling all of them Fraxinetum or a variant thereof, such as Frassineto, Frascendello or Fraxinth. A string of forts was constructed across the Alps to control the mountain passes and serve as bases for raiding.

The form of Islamic rule imposed by Fraxinetum was indirect. Christians retained their religion and towns their self-government through agreeing to the dhimma (the pact of submission) and paying the jizya (a head tax). The main business of the conquerors was "the capture of Europeans for the slave markets of the Islamic world."

Archaeological evidence in the form of 10th-century Muslim shipwrecks off the coast of Provence suggests that Fraxinetum maintained commercial links with the rest of the Muslim world. The archeological remains of pottery and evidence of mining and forging have been found in connection with the Saracen presence in Provence.

== Timeline ==
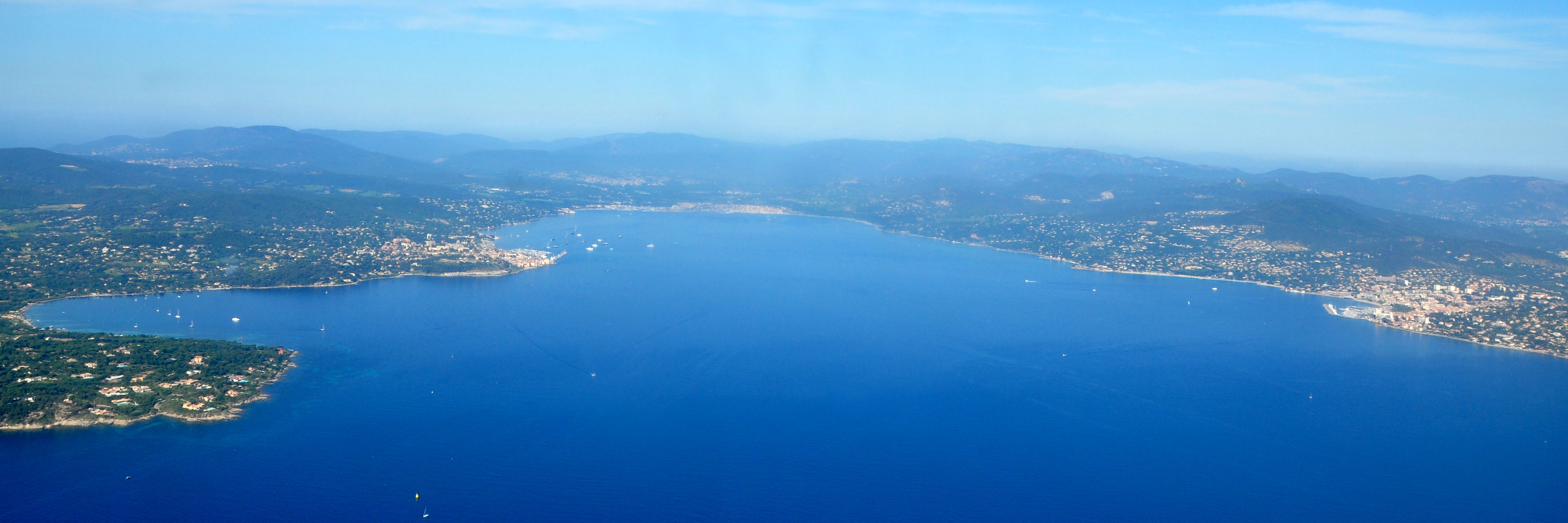
Aerial view of the Gulf of Saint-Tropez, where Fraxinetum was located

- 889: Twenty Andalusis sail up the Gulf of St. Tropez and found a colony at Fraxinetum.
- 906: Andalusis cross the defiles of the Dauphiné and Mont Cénis.
- 908: Andalusis occupy the Susa Valley.
- 911: Andalusis hold passes in the Western Alps.
- 929: Fraxinetum forces advance to borders of Liguria.
- 935: Sa'id dies at the Battle of Acqui.
- 940: Andalusis occupy and colonize Toulon.
- 942: Andalusi settlement at Nice and Grenoble.
- 956: Muslims made an incursion into the Upper Rhine Valley within present-day Germany.
- 970: Andalusis evacuate Grenoble, Savoy and Gap.
- 972: Andalusis detain Majolus of Cluny at the Great St Bernard Pass
- 973: After the Battle of Tourtour, the Andalusis evacuate Fraxinetum.
- 1047: Andalusi raid on Lérins Islands.

== Sources ==
=== Primary sources ===
- Flodoard (2014). Bernard S. Bachrach; Steven Fanning; Philippe Lauer (eds.). The Annals of Flodoard of Reims, 919–966. Toronto: University of Toronto Press.
- Liudprand (2007). Paolo Squatriti (ed.). The Complete Works of Liudprand of Cremona. Washington, D.C.: Catholic University of America Press.

=== Secondary sources ===
- Ballan, Mohammad (2010). "Fraxinetum: An Islamic Frontier State in Tenth-Century Provence". Comitatus: A Journal of Medieval and Renaissance Studies. 41: 23–76. doi:10.1353/cjm.2010.0053. S2CID 144048972.
- Bruce, Scott G. (2007). "An Abbot Between Two Cultures: Maiolus of Cluny Considers the Muslims of La Garde-Freinet". Early Medieval Europe. 15 (4): 426–40. doi:10.1111/j.1468-0254.2007.00215.x. S2CID 161927593.
- Bruce, Scott G. (2016). Cluny and the Muslims of La Garde-Freinet: Hagiography and the Problem of Islam in Medieval Europe. Cornell University Press. ISBN 9780801452994.
- Carozzi, Claude (2002). "La vie de Saint Bobon: Un modèle clunisien de sainteté laïque". In Michel Lauwers (ed.). Guerriers et moines: Conversion et sainteté aristocratiques dans l'occident médiéval (IX^{e}–XII^{e} siècle). Brepols. pp. 467–491.
- Chalmeta Gendrón, Pedro (1976). "La Méditerranée occidentale et al-Andalus de 934 à 941: les données d'Ibn Hayyan". Rivista degli studi orientali. 50 (3/4): 337–51. JSTOR 41879841.
- Fernandes Cardoso, Elsa (2019). "Politics and Diplomacy in the Mediterranean of the 10th Century: Al-Andalus and Byzantium". In Daniëlle Slootjes; Mariette Verhoeven (eds.). Byzantium in Dialogue with the Mediterranean: History and Heritage. Leiden: Brill. doi:10.1163/9789004393585. ISBN 9789004393585. S2CID 243385754.
- Jarrett, Jonathan (2019). "Nests of Pirates? 'Islandness' in the Balearic Islands and La Garde-Freinet" (PDF). Al-Masāq. 31 (2): 196–222. doi:10.1080/09503110.2019.1600101. S2CID 166382996.
- Joncheray, Jean-Pierre (2004). "The Four Saracen Shipwrecks of Provence". In Sean Kingsley (ed.). Barbarian Seas: Late Rome to Islam. London: Periplus. pp. 102–107.
- Kaldellis, Anthony (2024). The New Roman Empire: A History of Byzantium. Oxford University Press.
- Lauwers, Michel (2015). "Des Sarrasins en Provence: représentations ecclésiales et luttes pour l'hégémonie en Méditerranée occidentale du X^{e} au XIII^{e} siècle". In Catherine Richarté; Roland-Pierre Gayraud; Jean-Michel Poisson (eds.). Héritages arabo-islamiques dans l'Europe méditerranéenne. La Découverte. pp. 23–40. doi:10.3917/dec.richa.2015.01.0023. ISBN 978-2-7071-8622-5.
- Lebling, Robert (2000). "The Pirates of St. Tropez". Medieval Life. 14: 26–31. Archived from the original on 2001-06-22.
- Lebling, Robert (2009). "The Saracens of St. Tropez". Saudi Aramco World. Houston, TX: Aramco Services Company. pp. 32–39.
- Lévi-Provençal, Évariste (1950). Histoire de l'Espagne musulmane, II: Le califat umaiyade de Cordoue (912–1031). Paris: G. P. Maisonneuve.
- Leyser, Karl (1968). "Henry I and the Beginnings of the Saxon Empire". English Historical Review. 83 (326): 1–32. doi:10.1093/ehr/LXXXIII.CCCXXVI.1. JSTOR 561761.
- Lewis, Archibald R. (1965). Development of Southern French and Catalan Society, 718–1050. University of Texas Press.
- Lewis, B.; Pellat, Ch. & Schacht, J., eds. (1965). "Fraxinetum". The Encyclopaedia of Islam, Second Edition. Volume II: C–G. Leiden: E. J. Brill. pp. 933–34. OCLC 495469475.
- Manteyer, Georges de (1908). La Provence du premier au douzième siècle. Paris.
- Nash, Penelope (2016). "The Ottonians Turn their Gaze West to the Court of al-Andalus". Journal of the Australian Early Medieval Association. 12: 53–68. doi:10.35253/JAEMA.2016.1.3.
- Pryor, John H.; Jeffreys, Elizabeth M. (2006). The Age of the Δρομων: The Byzantine Navy, ca 500–1204. Brill.
- Poupardin, René (1901). Le Royaume de Provence sous les Carolingiens, 855–933. Paris: Émile Bouillon.
- Poupardin, René (1907). Le Royaume de Bourgogne, 888–1038: étude sur les origines du royaume d'Arles. Paris: Champion.
- Reinaud, Joseph Toussaint (1955) [1836]. Muslim Colonies in France, Northern Italy and Switzerland. Translated by Haroon Khan Sherwani. Lahore: Ashraf.
- Rennie, Kriston R. (2016). "The Saracen Legend of Tenth-Century Provence". The Mediaeval Journal. 6 (2): 1–24. doi:10.1484/J.TMJ.5.112760.
- Rey, Gonzague de (1878). Les invasions des Sarrasins en Provence pendant le VIII^{e}, le IX^{e}, et le X^{e} siècle. Marseille: Marius Olive.
- Sénac, Philippe (1981). "Contribution à l'étude des incursions musulmanes dans l'Occident chrétien: la localisation du Gabal al-Qilâl". Revue des mondes musulmans et de la Méditerranée. 31 (31): 7–14. doi:10.3406/remmm.1981.1900.
- Sénac, Philippe (1990). "Note sur le Fraxinet des Maures". Annales du Sud-Est varois. 15: 19–23.
- Sénac, Philippe (2004). "Le califat de Cordoue et la Méditerranée occidentale au X^{e} siècle: le Fraxinet des Maures". In Jean-Marie Martin (ed.). Castrum 7. Zones côtières littorales dans le monde méditerranéen au Moyen Âge: défense, peuplement, mise en valeur. École française de Rome. pp. 113–26.
- Sénac, Philippe (2006). "Les musulmans en Provence en X^{e} siècle". In Mohammed Arkoun (ed.). Histoire de l'Islam et des musulmans en France du Moyen Âge à nos jours. Paris: Albin Michel. pp. 26–39.
- Terrisse, Marc (2014). "La présence arabo-musulmane en Languedoc et en Provence à l'époque médiévale". Hommes & Migrations (1306): 126–28. doi:10.4000/hommesmigrations.2837.
- Tyler, J. E. (1930). The Alpine Passes: The Middle Ages (962–1250). Oxford: Basil Blackwell.
- Valdés Fernández, Fernando (2013). "De embajadas y regalos entre califas y emperadores" (PDF). Awraq: Estudios sobre el mundo árabe e islámico contemporáneo. 7: 25–41.
- Versteegh, Kees (1990). "The Arab Presence in France and Switzerland in the 10th Century". Arabica. 37 (3): 359–88. doi:10.1163/157005890X00041.
- Watson, William E. (1990). The Hammer and the Crescent: Contacts between Andalusi Muslims, Franks, and their Successors in Three Waves of Muslim Expansion into Francia (PhD thesis). University of Pennsylvania.
- Weinberger, Stephen (1992). "The Reordering of Society in Medieval Provence". Revue belge de Philologie et d'Histoire. 70 (4): 907–20. doi:10.3406/rbph.1992.3860.
- Weinberger, Stephen (1973). "Peasant Households in Provence: ca. 800–1100". Speculum. 48 (2): 247–57. doi:10.2307/2852772. JSTOR 2852772. S2CID 162681608.
- Wenner, Manfred W. (1980). "The Arab/Muslim Presence in Medieval Central Europe". International Journal of Middle East Studies. 12 (1): 59–79. doi:10.1017/S0020743800027136. S2CID 162537404.
- Zerner, Monique (1997). "La capture de Maïeul et la guerre de libération en Provence: le départ des sarrasins vu à travers les cartulaires provençaux". Saint Mayeul et son temps: Millénaire de la mort de Saint-Mayeul, 4^{e} abbé de Cluny, 994–1994. Digne-les-Bains: Société scientifique et littéraire des Alpes de Haute-Provence. pp. 199–210.
