= Abu Zayd al-Balkhi =

Persian polymath (850-934)

Abu Zayd Ahmed ibn Sahl al-Balkhi
- Born: 850; Shamistiyan, Balkh, Khorasan (modern day northern Afghanistan)
- Died: 934 (aged 83–84)

Philosophical work
- Era: Islamic Golden Age
- Region: Persian scholar
- School: Persian science, Islamic science, Islamic geography, Islamic mathematics, Islamic medicine, Islamic psychological thought
- Main interests: Geography, Mathematics, Medicine, Neuroscience, Psychology, Science

Abu Zayd Ahmed ibn Sahl Balkhi (Persian: ابو زید احمد بن سهل بلخی) was a Persian Muslim polymath: a geographer, mathematician, physician, psychologist and scientist. Born in 850 CE in Shamistiyan, in the province of Balkh, Greater Khorasan, he was a disciple of al-Kindi. He also founded the "Balkhī school" of terrestrial mapping in Baghdad. Al-Balkhi is believed to have been one of the earliest to diagnose that mental illness can have psychological and physiological causes and he was the first to typify four types of emotional disorders: fear and anxiety; anger and aggression; sadness and depression; and obsessions.

== Biography ==
al-Balkhi was born in 850 CE in a small village called Shamisitiyan, in an area called Balkh which is now part of Afghanistan. As a young man, around the time of al-Kindi's death, al-Balkhi travelled to Iraq.

At this time Islamic culture was making strong efforts to absorb the knowledge of previous civilisations, and having its own cultural flowering. This period is sometimes termed the Islamic Golden Age.

al-Balkhi spent eight years in Iraq. One of his teachers was philosopher Abū Yūsof alKendī.

He returned to Balḵ and began teaching what he had learned. Ahmad ibn Sahl, the ruler of Balkh and its surroundings, offered him both a writing and a ministerial position and al-Balkh accepted the former and declined the latter. The king respected his decision and rewarded him handsomely.

al-Balkhi later travelled to Baghdad again, before returning to Balkh for the last time and staying there until his death in 934 CE.

=== Personal characteristics ===
al-Balkhi had a reserved and isolated character, leading scholars to have a lack of knowledge on his personal life.

According to Abu Muhammad al-Hassan ibn al-Waziri, one of his students, al-Balkhi's face was covered in scars that he acquired during an episode of smallpox.

== Works ==
Of the many books ascribed to him in the al-Fihrist by Ibn al-Nadim, one can note The Excellency of Mathematics and his On Certitude in Astrology. His Figures of the Climates (Suwar al-aqalim) consisted chiefly of geographical maps. He also wrote the medical and psychological work, Masalih al-Abdan wa al-Anfus (Sustenance for Body and Soul).

A modern scholar describes the bulk of his works as "more than 60 books and manuscripts, meticulously researching disciplines as varied in scope as geography, medicine, theology, politics, philosophy, poetry, literature, Arabic grammar, astrology, astronomy, mathematics, biography, ethics, sociology as well as others."

=== Figures of the Regions ===
His Figures of the Regions (Suwar al-aqalim) consisted chiefly of geographical maps. It led to him founding the "Balkhī school" of terrestrial mapping in Baghdad. The geographers of this school also wrote extensively of the peoples, products, and customs of areas in the Muslim world, with little interest in the non-Muslim realms.

=== Sustenance for Bodies and Souls ===
The second part of this manuscript is known as Sustenance for the Soul.

==== Principles of Interaction ====
His balance between technical terminology and common ethical sense could be found in his monograph where he talks about the interaction between the elements of the body, seasons, and the traditional "non-natural" health elements, such as food and sleep.

==== Mental health and mental illness ====
In Islamic psychology, the concepts of mental health and "mental hygiene" were introduced by Abu Zayd al-Balkhi, who often related it to spiritual health. In his Masalih al-Abdan wa al-Anfus (Sustenance for Body and Soul), he was the first to successfully discuss diseases related to both the body and the soul. He used the term al-Tibb al-Ruhani to describe spiritual and psychological health, and the term Tibb al-Qalb to describe mental medicine.

He criticized many medical doctors in his time for placing too much emphasis on physical illnesses and neglecting the psychological or mental illnesses of patients, and argued that "since man’s construction is from both his soul and his body, therefore, human existence cannot be healthy without the ishtibak [interweaving or entangling] of soul and body." He further argued that "if the body gets sick, the nafs [psyche] loses much of its cognitive and comprehensive ability and fails to enjoy the desirous aspects of life" and that "if the nafs gets sick, the body may also find no joy in life and may eventually develop a physical illness."

Al-Balkhi traced back his ideas on mental health to verses of the Qur'an and hadiths attributed to Muhammad, such as:

"In their hearts is a disease."

— Qur'an 2:10

"Truly, in the body there is a morsel of flesh, and when it is corrupt the body is corrupt, and when it is sound the body is sound. Truly, it is the qalb [heart]."

— Sahih al-Bukhari, Kitab al-Iman

"Verily Allah does not consider your appearances or your wealth in (appraising you) but He considers your hearts and your deeds."

— Musnad Ahmad ibn Hanbal, no. 8707

==== Cognitive and medical psychology and cognitive therapy ====
Abu Zayd al-Balkhi was the first to differentiate between neurosis and psychosis, and the first to classify neurotic disorders and pioneer cognitive therapy in order to treat each of these classified disorders. He classified neurosis into four emotional disorders: fear and anxiety, anger and aggression, sadness and depression, and obsession. He further classified three types of depression: normal depression or sadness (huzn), endogenous depression originating from within the body, and reactive clinical depression originating from outside the body. He also wrote that a healthy individual should always keep healthy thoughts and feelings in his mind in the case of unexpected emotional outbursts in the same way drugs and First Aid medicine are kept nearby for unexpected physical emergencies. He stated that a balance between the mind and body is required for good health and that an imbalance between the two can cause sickness. Al-Balkhi also introduced the concept of reciprocal inhibition (al-ilaj bi al-did), which was re-introduced over a thousand years later by Joseph Wolpe in 1969.

==== Psychophysiology and psychosomatic medicine ====
The Muslim physician Abu Zayd al-Balkhi was a pioneer of psychotherapy, psychophysiology and psychosomatic medicine. He recognized that the body and the soul can be healthy or sick, or "balanced or imbalanced", and that mental illness can have both psychological and/or physiological causes. He wrote that imbalance of the body can result in fever, headaches and other physical illnesses, while imbalance of the soul can result in anger, anxiety, sadness and other mental symptoms.

==== Depression ====
al-Balkhi recognized two types of depression:

- one caused by known reasons such as loss or failure, which can be treated psychologically through both external methods (such as persuasive talking, preaching and advising) and internal methods (such as the "development of inner thoughts and cognitions which help the person get rid of his depressive condition"); and
- the other caused by unknown reasons such as a "sudden affliction of sorrow and distress, which persists all the time, preventing the afflicted person from any physical activity or from showing any happiness or enjoying any of the pleasures". He thought this was caused by physiological reasons (such as impurity of the blood) and could be treated through physical medicine.

He also wrote comparisons between physical disorders with mental disorders, and showed how psychosomatic disorders can be caused by certain interactions between them.

==== Phobias ====
Abu Zayd al-Balkhi initially wrote about phobia in the 9th century, calling it Fazaa'. As of today, it is still defined in a similar manner as to what was described by al-Balkhi. Al-Balkhi details the disorder as an extreme type of fear that results in the anxiety levels of a person spiking due to increasing the depth of blood in the body. This causes the person to become shaky and disoriented, preventing them from making decisions in a timely manner. Rather than taking medicine or proceeding with blood letting, which were common methods to help an individual, he suggested gradual exposure to the object or situation that caused the fear. This technique was known as reyadat al-nafs.

==== OCD ====
al-Balkhi differentiated OCD from other forms of mental illness.

==== Managing fear ====
===== Knowledge of the cause =====
al-Balkhi quotes a saying that "most of the terror comes from anticipation of the terror" and advocates being informed and realistic about the true nature of a concern.

===== Exposure therapy =====
He advocates 'forcing oneself to repeatedly expose one's hearing and sight to noxious things' and to 'moved again and again near the thing it is scared of until it becomes used to it and loses its fear.

==== Core emotions ====
al-Balkhi wrote that anxiety and distress were at the core of all harmful emotional symptoms (e.g. anger) and that happiness and joyfulness were the root cause of all positive emotional states (e.g. tranquility, pleasure and delight).

==== Sexual attributes ====
While the topic of sex is more widely discussed today, al-Balkhi explored the subject in detail, specifically various sexual attributes and the affects that they have on an individual. A specific talking point that he mentioned in his work was the act of remaining abstinent. By doing so, an individual subjects themself to physical ailments, since the act is deemed by him to be "unnatural". He also recommended a specific diet and to abstain from taking medications that were believed to enhance sexuality as a means to treat sexual impotence.

== Politics ==
In a collection of works by the 10th-century al-Tawhidi, al-Balkhi describes politics as an art that aims to contribute to the rise of a country. Furthermore, he mentions five separate sources that play into the overall outcome of politics. These include the tangible cause as corresponding to the subjects' affairs, the official reason as to the overall well-being of the people, the driving force as "the ruler’s concern for the affairs of his subjects", the purpose as the preservation of public welfare, as well as the instrumental cause consisting of using "incitement and intimidation" to achieve the goal.

== See also ==
- List of scientists in medieval Islamic world
- Science in the medieval Islamic world
- Mathematics in medieval Islam
- Medicine in the medieval Islamic world

== Sources ==
- M. J. de Goeje: "Die Istakhri-Balkhi Frage" (Zeitschrift der Deutschen Morgenländischen Gesellschaft, vol. 25, 42–58, 1871).
- H. Suter: Die Mathematiker und Astronomen der Araber (211, 1900).
- Bosworth, C. E.; Asimov, M. S., eds. (2003). History of Civilizations of Central Asia, Volume IV. The age of achievement: A. D. 750 to the end of the fifteenth century. Delhi: Motilal Banarsidass Publications. p. 745. ISBN 9788120815964.
