= Gina Fasoli =

Italian historian (1905–1992)

Luigina Fasoli (5 June 1905, in Bassano del Grappa – 1992, in Bologna) was an Italian historian, best remembered for her academic work in the fields of medieval cities, the historiography of feudal society, and the history of Lombardy. A graduate of the University of Bologna, she was later a professor emeritus there, and also taught at the University of Catania.
