= La Garde-Freinet =

- Commune
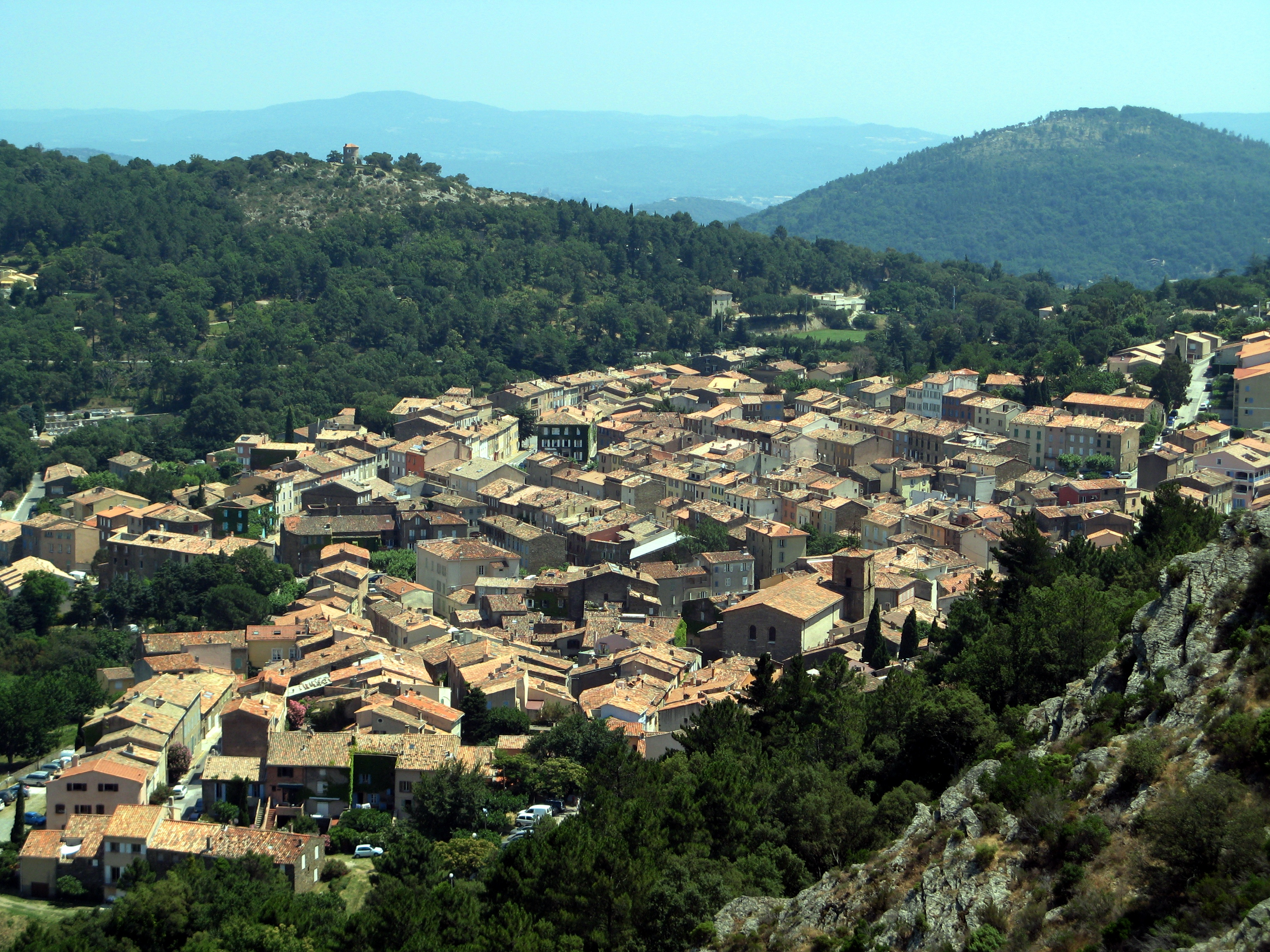
- La Garde-Freinet, seen from the fort

- Coat of arms
- Location of La Garde-Freinet
- Location within France Location within Provence-Alpes-Côte d'Azur
- Coordinates: 43°19′03″N 6°28′12″E
- Country: France
- Region: Provence-Alpes-Côte d'Azur
- Department: Var
- Arrondissement: Draguignan
- Canton: Le Luc
- Intercommunality: Communauté de communes Méditerranée Porte des Maures

Government
  - Mayor (2020–2026): Thomas Dombry (Independent)
- Area^{1}: 76.64 km^{2} (29.59 sq mi)
- Highest elevation: 674 m (2,211 ft)
- Lowest elevation: 60 m (200 ft)
- Population (2023): 1,862
  - Density: 24.30/km^{2} (62.92/sq mi)
- Time zone: UTC+01:00 (CET)
  - Summer (DST): UTC+02:00 (CEST)
- INSEE/Postal code: 83063 /83680
- ^{1} French Land Register data, which excludes lakes, ponds, glaciers > 1 km^{2} (0.386 sq mi or 247 acres) and river estuaries.

La Garde-Freinet (French pronunciation: [la ɡaʁd fʁɛnɛ]; Provençal: La Gàrdia Frainet) is a commune in the Var department in the Côte d'Azur area in southeastern France.

== Location ==
La Garde-Freinet is a medieval French mountain village, located in the Massif des Maures, 15 km northwest of Saint-Tropez. It is accessible via picturesque winding roads that run through forests of cork, oaks, and chestnuts.

== History ==
The village was the site of Fraxinet, an Arab settlement of the ninth to tenth centuries. This settlement was used to demand ransoms and assassinate pilgrims and travelers going from France to Italy.

== Culture ==
La Garde-Freinet maintains a strong Provençal identity, with weekly markets featuring local produce, crafts, and regional specialties. Seasonal festivals, such as the chestnut fair held in autumn, draw visitors from the surrounding region. The village also hosts several small galleries and ateliers, reflecting its appeal to local and international artists. Community life revolves around the central square, where cultural events, pétanque tournaments, and open-air concerts are occasionally held.

== Artistic Community ==
Since the late 20th century, La Garde-Freinet has attracted a growing community of artists and creatives. Painters such as Susanna Linhart and Olivier Henggeler, along with ceramists like Théodora Lecrinier, maintain workshops and exhibitions in the village and the surrounding area. Local galleries and studios—like Atelier Galerie Terre de Sienne—regularly open their doors for exhibitions, drawing both visitors and art lovers.

== Sights ==
Established in the 11th century, the village has preserved its character with its field stone houses, old fashioned street names, and a village square framed with restaurants and local art galleries. From atop old Fort Freinet one can see the plains of Saint-Clément and the Argens valley, all the way to the Alps.

== Natural Environment ==
Located in the Massif des Maures, La Garde-Freinet is surrounded by dense cork oak forests and chestnut groves. The area is known for its biodiversity, including wild boar, deer, and a variety of bird species. Several marked trails begin near the village and lead to panoramic viewpoints, including the ruins of Fort Freinet. The region's natural setting attracts hikers, cyclists, and nature enthusiasts year-round.

== People ==
- André Pousse (1919 - 2005) French actor

== See also ==
- Communes of the Var department
