= Michael Jan de Goeje =

Dutch orientalist (1836–1909)

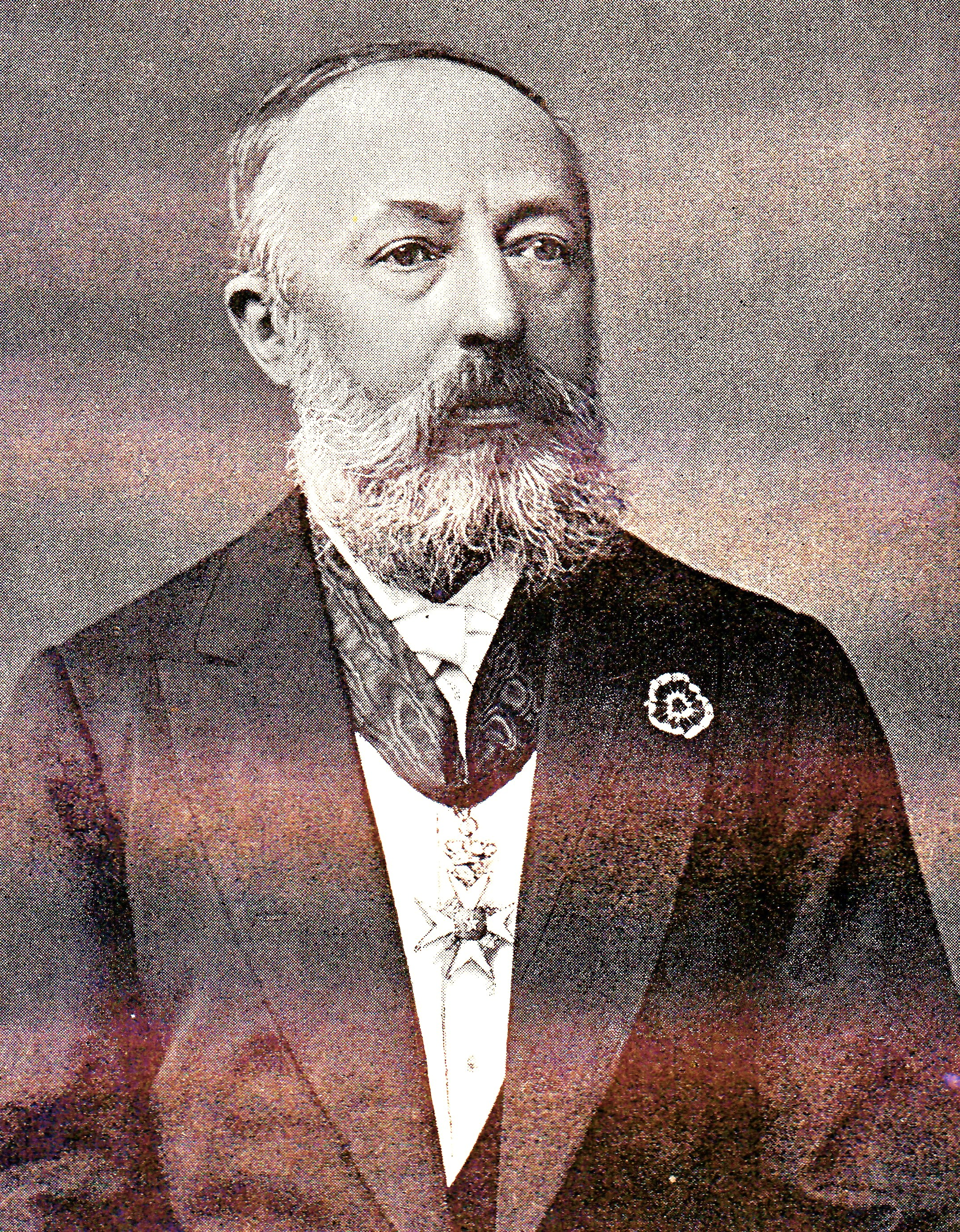
- Michael Jan de Goeje
- Born: August 13, 1836; Dronrijp, Netherlands
- Died: May 17, 1909 (aged 72); Leiden, Netherlands
- Occupation: Orientalist
- Children: Claudius de Goeje

Michael Jan de Goeje (August 13, 1836 – May 17, 1909) was a Dutch orientalist focusing on Arabia and Islam.

== Early life ==
Michael Jan de Goeje was born in Dronrijp, Friesland. He devoted himself at an early age to the study of oriental languages and became especially proficient in Arabic, under the guidance of Reinhart Dozy and Theodor Juynboll, to whom he was afterwards an intimate friend and colleague. He took his degree of doctor at Leiden in 1860, and then studied for a year in Oxford, where he examined and collated the Bodleian manuscripts of al-Idrisi (part being published in 1866, in collaboration with Dozy, as Description de l'Afrique et de l'Espagne). About the same time he wrote Mémoires de l'histoire et de la géographie orientales, and edited Expugnatio regionum. In 1883, on the death of Dozy, he became Arabic professor at Leiden, retiring in 1906.

== Career ==
Though perhaps not a teacher of the first order, he wielded great influence during his long tenure of the chair not only over his pupils, but over theologians and eastern administrators who attended his lectures. His many editions of Arabic texts are of the highest value to scholars; the most important being his great edition of Tabari. Though highly averse to politics, he took a keen interest in the municipal affairs of Leiden and made a special study of elementary education. He took the leading part in the International Congress of Orientalists at Algiers in 1905. He was a member of the Institut de France, was awarded the German Order of Merit, and received an honorary doctorate of Cambridge University. At his death he was president of the newly formed International Association of Academies of Science. He became a member of the Royal Netherlands Academy of Arts and Sciences in 1869.

== Bibliography ==
Among his chief works are:

- Fragmenta historicorum Arabicorum (1869-1871) Fragmenta historicorum arabicorum Volume 1 Volume 2 Fragmenta historicorum arabicorum Fragmenta historicorum arabicorum
- Diwan of Moslim ibn al-Wâlid (1875)
- Bibliotheca geographorum Arabicorum (1870-1894) Bibliotheca geographorum arabicorum. Pars prima-[octava] Bibliotheca geographorum arabicorum Bibliotheca Geographorum Arabicorum المجلد السابع من كتاب الأعلاق النفيسة
- Annals of Tabari (History of the Prophets and Kings) (1879-1901)
- ibn Khordadbeh Abu'l Qasim Ubaid'Allah, al-Kitab al-Masalik w’al- Mamalik (Livre des Routes et des Royaumes, الكتاب المسالك والممالك), about 870. Kitab Masalik wa al-mamalik Kitab Masalik wa al-mamalik

Fr. translation: Leyde, 1889; repr. Francfort/Main, 1992.

- An edition of Ibn Qutaiba's biographies (1904)
- of the travels of Ibn Jubayr (1907, 5th vol. of Gibb Memorial).

He was also the chief editor of the Encyclopaedia of Islam (vols. i.-iii.), and contributed many articles to periodicals. He wrote for the 9th edition of the Encyclopædia Britannica.

== Commemoration ==
De Goeje's name is preserved in that of the Stichting de Goeje which subsidises the publication of academic studies relating to the Middle East.
