= Slavery in Europe =

Slavery in Europe may refer to:

- Atlantic slave trade (involving Europe)
- Slavery in antiquity
  - Slavery in ancient Greece
  - Slavery in ancient Rome
- Slavery in medieval Europe
- Slavery in modern Europe

== See also ==
- History of slavery
- Category:Slavery in Europe for a list of slavery by particular country topics
