= Levinus Warner =

Dutch diplomat and orientalist

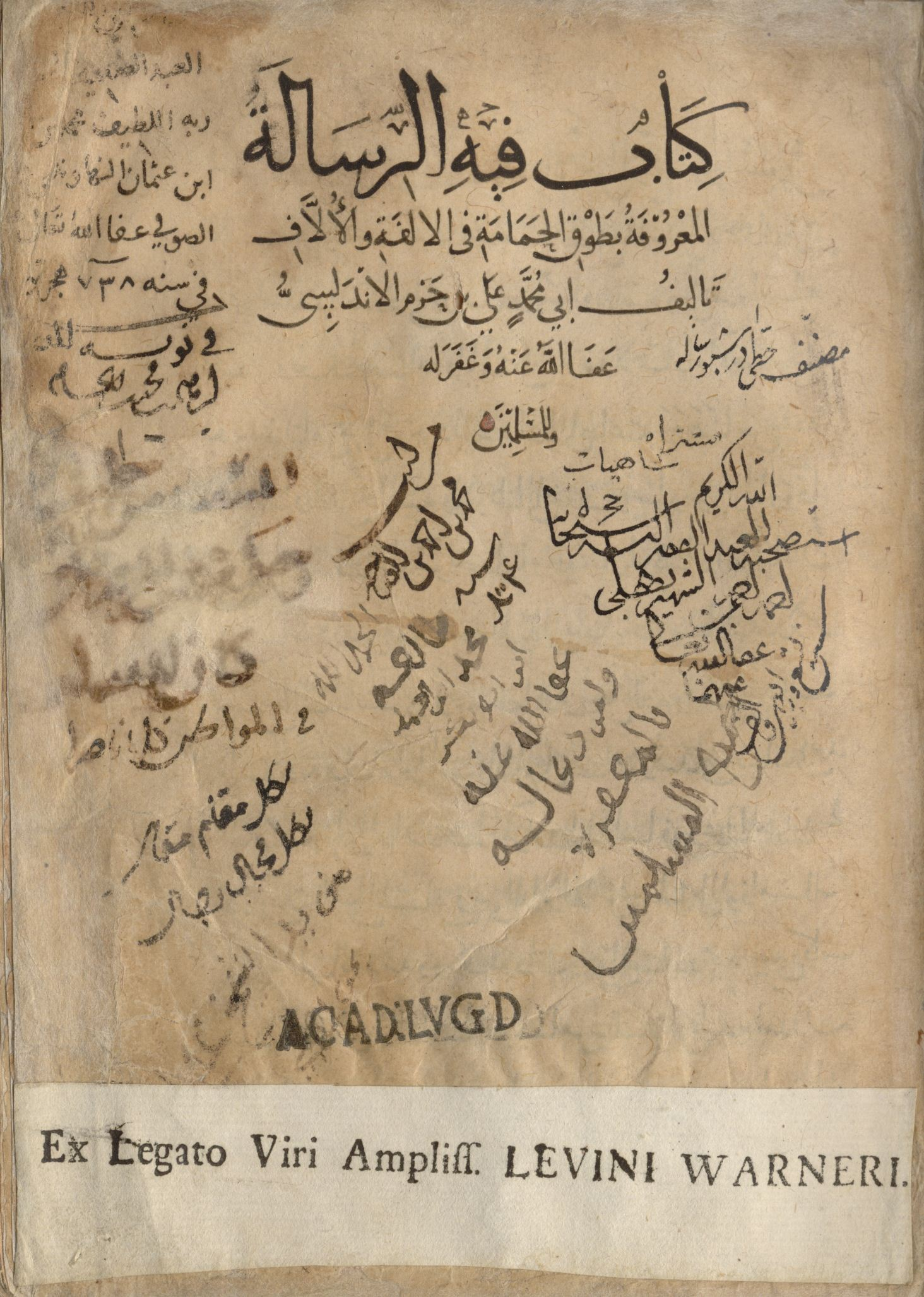
- Manuscript of The Ring of the Dove by Ibn Hazm from the Warner collection in Leiden University Library, 1338 CE/738 AH
- Born: c. 1618; Lippe, Holy Roman Empire
- Died: 22 June 1665; Constantinople, Ottoman Empire
- Education: Leiden University
- Occupations: orientalist, manuscript collector

Levinus Warner (c. 1618 – 22 June 1665) was a German-born Orientalist, manuscript collector and diplomat for the Dutch Republic in the Ottoman Empire.

== Life ==
Levinus Warner, or Levinus Warnerus, was born in c. 1618 in the principality of Lippe, Holy Roman Empire. Following his secondary education at the Paedagogium or Altes Gymnasium in Bremen he attended the Athenaeum Illustre there in 1636, where he received instruction from its headmaster Ludwig Crocius, from whom he developed his interest in oriental languages. On 19 May 1638 he matriculated at Leiden University as a student of Philosophy. He studied Middle Eastern languages under Jacobus Golius (1596–1667) and Biblical Hebrew under Constantine L'Empereur (1591–1648). He earned his living as a tutor to the nephews of Radslav Kinsky, an expatriate Bohemian nobleman. In 1642 Warner followed his pupils to Amsterdam, where he met the Hebrew scholar and printer Menasseh Ben Israel. Between 1642 and 1644 he published four small treatises on Oriental subjects, apparently to attract the patronage of wealthy Dutch merchants and scholars.

== Constantinople ==
Warner departed from Amsterdam in December 1644, travelling overland via Gdańsk and Lviv in the Polish-Lithuanian Commonwealth. He finally arrived in Constantinople in the autumn of 1645. The first years he worked as a secretary for Nicolaas Ghisbrechti or Ghysbrechtsz, a jeweller originally from the Southern Netherlands who had been involved in the Capitulations accorded to the Dutch Republic in 1612. When Ghisbrechti became resident for the Dutch Republic, in 1647, Warner continued working for him. After Ghisbrechti's death in 1654 Warner took over from him as resident, receiving his first appointment from the States General on 30 January 1655. He would remain in this position.

Since the Dutch Republic did not pursue an active diplomatic policy in the Ottoman Empire, however, Warner led a relatively quiet life ‘entirely after the Turkish fashion’, which was only occasionally disturbed by diplomatic imbroglios over Dutch assistance to Venice in the Cretan War and accusations of piracy. The latter once led to his temporary incarceration in the Sultan's palace in Edirne (Adrianople). As a diplomat, Warner was entitled to a share in the consular duties on all Dutch trade from and to the Ottoman Empire, a source of endless friction with the Dutch consul in Smyrna (İzmir), the hub of Dutch economic activity in the Levant. Warner's official correspondence has been published by Willem Nicolaas du Rieu (1883).

Warner lived with Cocone de Christophle, his Greek Orthodox common-law wife, but they had no children. Warner died in Constantinople on 22 June 1665.

== Oriental manuscript collection ==
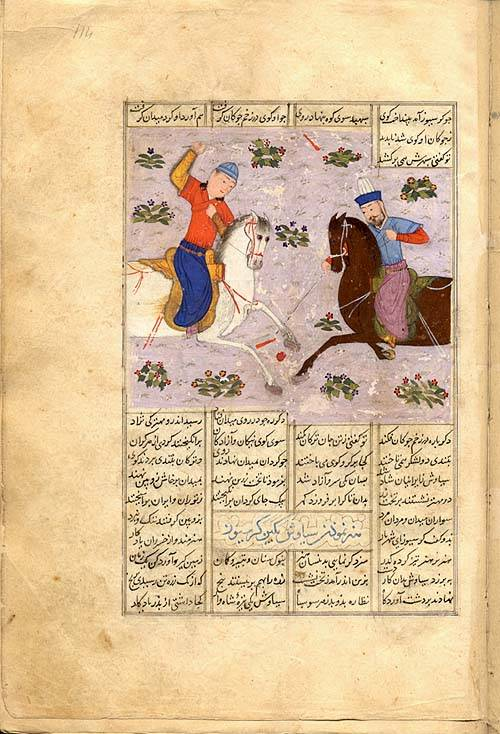
Shahnama by Manṣūr b. Ḥasan Firdawsī (Coll. Leiden University Library)

During his twenty years of permanent residence in Constantinople, Warner acquired a private collection of slightly over 900 manuscripts in Middle Eastern languages (about two-thirds of which are in Arabic), 73 Hebrew manuscripts, some Greek manuscripts and two manuscripts in Armenian. Interesting but not unique is his collection of 218 Hebrew printed books. Warner acquired his manuscripts and books through the lively antiquarian booktrade in Constantinople, receiving help and advice from Arabs originally from Aleppo such as Muhammad al-‘Urdi al-Halabi (c. 1602-1660), whose faltering career probably forced him to offer his services to Warner, and the Aleppo-born Sâlih Efendi, known as Ibn Sallum, a physician-in-ordinary to Sultan Mehmed IV who died in 1669. Another Aleppine, Niqula ibn Butrus al-Halabi or Nicolaus Petri, worked for him as an amanuensis. Warner’s Oriental correspondence has been edited by M.Th. Houtsma (1887). Documentary evidence shows that Warner used middlemen to acquire his collection at auctions, and ex-libris annotations show that many of Warner’s manuscripts hail from high-ranking Ottoman bureaucrats or scholars.

In 1659 Warner had purchased a substantial part of the private collection of the celebrated bibliophile encyclopedist Kâtip Çelebi, also known as 'Hajji Khalifa'. Following the death of Çelebi, the collection, which had been the largest private library in Constantinople, was sold by his estate. This acquisition of Middle Eastern literature comprised items that traced to the private libraries of Ottoman sultans and a number of manuscripts originate from the libraries of Ayyubid emirs and Mamluk sultans. The majority of the collection treats secular subjects such as language and literature, history, philosophy and science. The Hebrew manuscripts originate mainly from the Karaites, a non-rabbinical Jewish sect which attracted a great deal of interest among contemporary Protestant scholars from Europe.

The collection also contains Warner’s scholarly notes, most of which remain unedited.

Highlights include the unique manuscript of Ibn Hazm’s Tawq al-hamama (طوق الحمامة), ‘the Ring of the Dove’, a treatise on love and friendship (Or. 927), first edited by D.K. Pétrof in 1914 and many times since, and the oldest extant illustrated Arabic manuscript on a scientific subject, the Kitab al-hasha’ish (كتاب الحشائش), a translation of De Materia Medica by Dioscorides Pedanius. The manuscript is dated Ramadan 475 / February 1083 (Or. 289). An item of palaeographical interest is a manuscript dated 252 / 866 of Kitab Gharib al-hadith (كتاب غريب الحديث) by Abu ‘Ubayd al-Qasim b. Sallam al-Harawi, the oldest dated Arabic manuscript on paper in the Western world (Or. 298).

== Legatum Warnerianum to Leiden ==
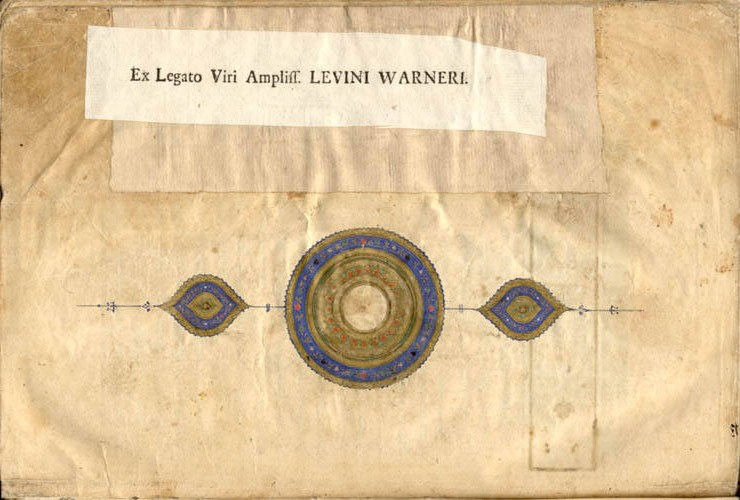
Shahnama (Coll. Leiden Library)

Under the terms of his will his entire collection, which came to be known as the Legatum Warnerianum, was left to Leiden University Library. Several copies of his will are preserved in the National Archives in The Hague (Archive inventory 1.01.02, file no. 6910). The first consignment arrived in Leiden in December 1668; other shipments followed until 1674. The first inventory was drawn up in 1668 by the Danish orientalist Theodorus Petraeus from Flensburg, which was later expanded by the Armenian copyist Shahin Qandi. Their work has not been preserved in the original form, but it was subsequently used by the German student N. Boots or Bootz, whose description of the Warner Legacy takes up a large part of the 1674 catalogue of the Leiden University Library (Spanheim 1674, pp. 316ff). In 1729 the title of Interpres Legati Warneriani was created by the governors of Leiden University to ensure the continuity of the collection by conservation, cataloguing and the production of scholarly editions. The title was first conferred on Albert Schultens (1686-1750), professor of Oriental languages at Leiden.

== Publications ==
- Dissertatio, qua de vitae termino, utrum fixus sit, an mobilis, disquiritur ex Arabum et Persarum scriptis, Amsterdam, 1642.
- Compendium historicum eorum quae Muhammedani de Christo et praecipuis aliquot religionis Christianae capitibus tradiderunt, Leiden, 1643.
- Proverbiorum et Sententiarum Persicarum centuria, Leiden, 1644.
- Epistola valedictoria in qua inter alia de stylo historiae Timuri, Leiden, 1644.
- De rebus Turcicis epistolae ineditae, ed. G.N. du Rieu, Leiden, 1883.
- Συλλογή Ελληνικών παροιμιών, ed. D.C. Hesseling, Athens, 1900.

== Literature ==
- M.Th. Houtsma: Uit de Oostersche correspondentie van Th. Erpenius, Jac. Golius en Lev. Warner. Eene bijdrage tot de geschiedenis van de beoefening der Oostersche letteren in Nederland. Amsterdam, 1887.
- P.S. van Koningsveld: 'Warner's manuscripts and books in the main printed catalogues', in: Levinus Warner and his legacy. Leiden, 1970, pp. 33–44.
- Levinus Warner and his legacy. Three centuries Legatum Warnerianum in the Leiden University Library. Catalogue of the commemorative exhibition held in the Bibliotheca Thysiana from April 27th till May 15th 1970. Leiden, 1970.
- J. Schmidt, A. Vrolijk (eds.): The Ottoman Legacy of Levinus Warner. Leiden, 2012. (Middle Eastern Manuscripts Online, 2). Online via http://www.brill.com/publications/online-resources/middle-eastern-manuscripts-online-2-ottoman-legacy-levinus-warner (restricted access).
- Spanheim, F. (ed.), Catalogus Bibliothecae Publicae Lugduno-Batavae noviter recognitus. Accessit incomparabilis thesaurus librorum Orientalium, Leiden, 1674.
- A. Vrolijk, J. Schmidt, K. Scheper: Turcksche boucken. De oosterse verzameling van Levinus Warner, Nederlands diplomaat in zeventiende-eeuws Istanbul / The Oriental collection of Levinus Warner, Dutch diplomat in seventeenth-century Istanbul. Eindhoven, 2012.
- J.J. Witkam: Inventory of the Oriental manuscripts of the University of Leiden. Leiden, 2007-..., online via http://www.islamicmanuscripts.info/inventories/leiden/index.html.
- P. Larcher: La première traduction européenne d’une Mu‘allaqa ? La version latine de la Mu‘allaqa d’Imru’ al-Qays par Levinus Warner (XVIIe siècle), dans Savants, amants, poètes et fous, séances offertes à Katia Zakharia, coordonnées par Catherine Pinon, Beyrouth, Presses de l’Ifpo, 2019, p. 35-61.
