= Taşköprüzade =

Ottoman Turkish historian and chronicler (1495–1561)

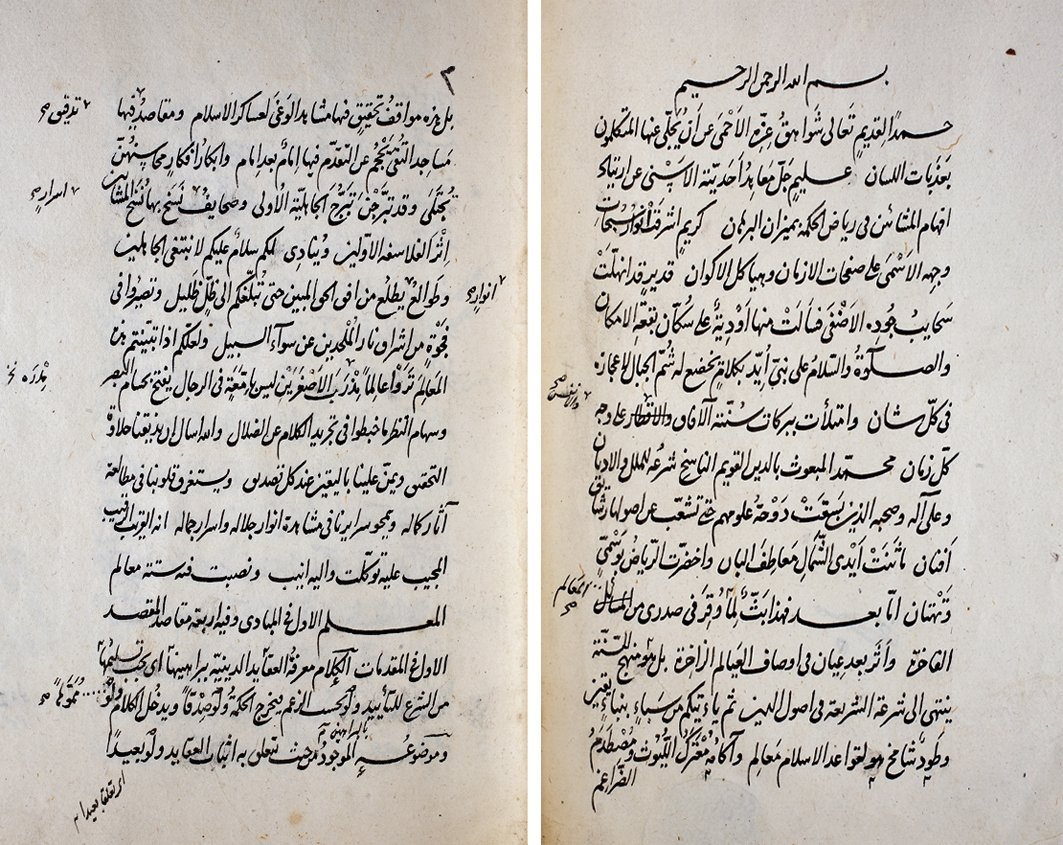
- The opening pages of Taşköprüzade's al-Maʿālim fī ʿilm al-kalām, preserved in the Beyazıt State Library, Istanbul

Personal life
- Born: 14 Rabīʿ al-Awwal 901 AH / 2 December 1495 Bursa, Ottoman Empire
- Died: 30 Rajab 968 AH / 16 April 1561 Istanbul, Ottoman Empire
- Resting place: Near the tomb of Sayyid Velayet, in the cemetery of Aşık Paşa Mosque, Fatih, Istanbul
- Children: Kemâleddin Mehmed Efendi
- Parent(s): Musliḥ al-Dīn Muṣṭafā Efendi (father)
- Era: 16th century
- Region: Anatolia, Ottoman Empire
- Notable work(s): Al-Shaqa'iq al-Nu'maniyya, Miftah al-Saada, al-Maʿālim fī ʿilm al-kalām, Risāla fī al-qaḍāʾ wa-al-qadar
- Other names: Taşköprülüzâde Ahmed Efendi, Taşköprizâde Ahmed Efendi, Taşköprîzâde Ahmed Efendi, Taşköprülüzade Ahmet, İsâmüddin Ebü'l-Hayr Ahmed Efendi
- Occupation: Mudarris, qadi, author

Religious life
- Religion: Islam
- Denomination: Sunni
- Jurisprudence: Hanafi
- Tariqa: Khalwatiyya / Halvetiyye
- Creed: Maturidi

Muslim leader
- Post: Mudarris at Ottoman madrasas, qadi of Bursa, qadi of Istanbul
- Influenced by: Abu Mansur al-Maturidi, Fakhr al-Din al-Razi, Sayf al-Din al-Amidi, Sayyid Sharif al-Jurjani
- Influenced: Kâtip Çelebi, Kemâleddin Mehmed Efendi, Ottoman biographical and encyclopedic scholarship

Taşköprüzade or Taşköprülüzade Ahmet (Arabic: طاشكبري أحمد), pseudonym of Aḥmad ibn Muṣṭafá ibn Khalīl Ṭāshkubrīʹzādah (Arabic: أحمد بن مصطفى بن خليل طاشكبري; Bursa, 3 December 1495 – Istanbul, 16 April 1561), was an Ottoman Turkish historian and chronicler living during the reign of Suleiman the Magnificent, who was famous for his great biographical encyclopedia titled Al-Shaqāʾiq al-Nuʿmāniyya fī ʿUlamāʾ al-Dawla al-ʿUthmāniyya (Arabic: الشقائق النعمانية في علماء الدولة العثمانية, lit. 'The Anemones, on the Scholars of the Ottoman Era').

== Life ==
The family was known as Taşköprülüler because Ahmet's grandfather had been a professor at the Muzafferiye madrassa of Hayreddin Halil in Taşköprü, Kastamonu. Taşköprülüzade received his first education from his father, Muṣliḥ al-Dīn Muṣṭafā, and his uncle, Kemaleddin Kasım, in Ankara and Bursa, and completed his studies in Istanbul. He was appointed to the Oruç Pasha Madrasah in Dimetoka in 1525, and then to the Hacı Hüseyinzade Madrasah in Istanbul. Later, he worked as a professor in various madrassa in Skopje and Edirne. He was appointed judge (qāḍī) of Bursa in 1545, and of Istanbul in 1551. A sight problem led to an early retirement from public service in 1554, but he continued working on the publication of his writings.

== Works ==
- Al-Shaqāʾiq al-Nuʿmāniyya fī ʿUlamāʾ al-Dawla al-ʿUthmāniyya (Arabic: الشقائق النعمانية في علماء الدولة العثمانية, lit. 'The Anemones, on the Scholars of the Ottoman Era'), a biographical encyclopedia on the life and works of 552 scholars and sheikhs from the first Ottoman ruler, Osman I, to Suleiman the Magnificent, and is the primary source for the lives of scholars and scientists under the reign of Mehmed II.
- Şaka'ikü'n-Nu'maniye fi-Ulemai'd-Devletü'l-Osmaniye (Turkish ed.), or Şakaik-ı Nu'maniye ve zeyilleri (Turkish ed.).
- Key to Happiness and the Lamp of Lordship (Arabic: مفتاح السعادة ومصباح السيادة, romanized: Miftāḥ al-Saʿāda wa-miṣbāḥ al-Siyādah; encyclopedia in Arabic. The great bibliographic encyclopedia Kashf al-Zunun of Kâtip Çelebi enlarged on the Miftāḥ al-Saʿāda, and in turn became the basis of Arabic-Latin and French translations by the European orientalists Gustav Leberecht Flügel and Barthélemy d'Herbelot, published in several volumes with the titles Bibliographical and Encyclopaedic Lexicon and Bibliothèque Orientale respectively.
- Miftâhü’s-Sa‘âde (Arabic), or Misbâh-üs-Siyâde fî Mevduât-ul-Ulûm, (Arabic); treats of the sciences of the period, and the works and writers of each branch.
- Mevzuat ül-Ulum (موضوعات العلوم), or Mevḍuʿât-ül-Ulûm (Turkish ed.), 'Fields of Science'; (Turkish ed.); Translation by his son, Kemâleddîn Mehmed Efendi.
- Al-Risālah fī al-Qaḍāʼ wa-al-Qadar (رسالة في القضاء والقدر) (Traité du décret et de l'arrêt divins)
- Osmanlı bilginleri (Istanbul, 2007); Sufi biography.
- Nawādir al-Akhbār fī Manāqib al-Akhyār

== See also ==
- Taşköprü family
