= Surat al-Ard =

10th-century book by Ibn Hawqal

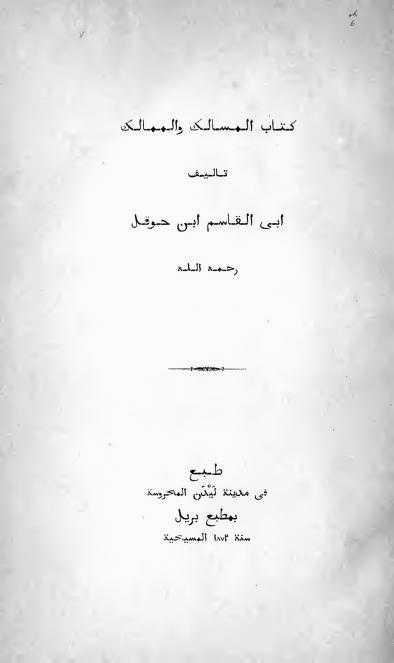
- Cover of the first Leiden edition
- Author: Ibn Hawqal
- Original title: Al-Masalik wa-l-Mamalik
- Illustrator: Ibn Hawqal
- Language: Arabic
- Subject: Description of a range of countries and regions that Ibn Hawqal visited during his travels
- Publication date: 10th century AD
- Text: Surat al-Ard at Wikisource
- Website: https://www.goodreads.com/book/show/33978095/

Surat al-Ard (Arabic: صورة الأرض, lit. 'Chapter of the Earth'), also known as Al-Masalik wa-l-Mamalik (Arabic: المسالك والممالك, lit. 'Passages and kingdoms'), is a book on geography and travel written by the merchant traveler Abu'l-Qasim Muhammad Ibn Hawqal following his travels, which commenced in 331 AH. The work was influenced by Istakhri, who requested that he complete his Masalik and Mamalik. Nevertheless, he ultimately elected to compose a revised volume, drawing upon Istakhri's treatise and a compendium of other geographical works, in addition to his own empirical data and insights gleaned from his peregrinations. Consequently, the content of the book is meticulously presented. In addition to geographical information, the book contains a range of scientific and historical content, including biographical information. Some chapters are presented in the form of a tourist guide. Each region is discussed in detail, with a special map provided for each area.

The book exists in multiple versions, each exhibiting distinctive characteristics. The initial manuscript included a dedication to Sayf al-Dawla al-Hamdani, while a second copy from 367 presented a critical analysis of the Hamdanids. Other versions demonstrate a pronounced proclivity towards the Fatimids. In his study, the orientalist Rizzitano posits that the final version of the book was written in 378 AH, following two attempts: one in 356 AH and the other in 357 AH. Nevertheless, there are those who posit that the final copy was produced subsequent to Ibn Hawqal's demise. The multiplicity of versions has resulted in a degree of variation among the extant manuscripts of the book. Consequently, there are numerous manuscripts distributed among various libraries in Istanbul, Leiden, Paris, and elsewhere. Additionally, the book has been published in multiple editions in various countries and has been translated into a number of languages, including English, French, Turkish, and others. These translations have been produced either in their entirety or in part.

== The author ==
Abu'l-Qasim Muhammad Ibn Hawqal was an Arab Muslim writer, geographer, historian, traveler, and merchant who lived during the 10th century AD. His writings on geography contained original information gained from his extensive travels, which spanned over three decades. This unique insight distinguished him from his contemporaries and predecessors, whether in his theoretical contributions or in his cartographic representations, which he created with his own hands. In the words of Ibn al-Adim, he was described as follows: "He was a virtuous individual hailing from the Nusaybin region". In addition to his book Surat al-Ard, he has another book entitled Kitab Saqalia, which is currently considered lost. He also published an article on the history of the Jews and their festivals in Hyderabad in 1947. The dearth of available sources has resulted in a number of discrepancies regarding his life and work. For instance, there is a lack of consensus on the date of his birth, with some sources indicating that he was born in the fourth century AH, while others provide no specific date. Additionally, there is a divergence of opinions regarding the span of his travels. Some sources limit these to a mere 26 years between 331 and 357, while others extend them to nearly 32 years. There was considerable divergence of opinion regarding his loyalties and ideological and political leanings. Some held the view that he was a political advocate, while others alleged that he was engaged in espionage on behalf of the Fatimids. These views may be attributed to his association with the Qarmatians of Bahrain, his condemnation of the inhabitants of Sicily, and his remarks concerning Andalusia, which could be interpreted as encouragement for the Fatimids or Abbasids to intervene in the region. Furthermore, he presented the initial manuscript of his book to Sayf al-Dawla al-Hamdani. The subsequent edition of the book evinces a pronounced inclination towards the Sunni Samanids. The discrepancy in historical accounts regarding his allegiance may be attributed to the reliance of some historians on the Leiden and Oxford versions of the Sourat al-Ard, which exhibit a pronounced and discernible Fatimid bias. This bias is absent in the Paris version and the other five Istanbul versions. The date of his death is also a point of contention. Haji Khalifa asserted that he died in 350 A.H. Al-Babani, in Hidayat al-'Arifin, proposed that he died in Andalusia, while Tehrani, in a different source, stated that he died in 380 A.H.

== Attribution of the book to Ibn Hawqal ==
There is consensus among researchers and other historians and bibliographers regarding the attribution of the book to Ibn Hawqal. However, some of them have differing opinions regarding the nomenclature of the book. Al-Babani, Elian Sarkis, and Haji Khalifa, as well as Ibn Khallikan, attributed it to him in multiple instances within the Wafayyat al-Ayyan. Additionally, numerous Orientalists who translated or otherwise engaged with the text, including William Uziel, Kramers, Weit, and De Goeje, concurred with this attribution.

== Naming ==
There is a discrepancy among sources regarding the specific title of Ibn Hawqal's book. This discrepancy is likely due to the varying starting points of the available copies of the book, as evidenced by the differing titles given by Ibn Khallikan the author of Kashf al-Zunun, who referenced it as "Al-Masalik wa-l-Mamalik". This is the title that was used for the first edition published in Leiden. The title of the second edition, which is primarily based on the Istanbul edition, is "Surat al-Ard." However, Ibn al-Adim referred to the book as "Goghraphia," stating that Ibn Hawqal, upon his departure from Baghdad in 331 AH, commenced the compilation of a geographical treatise, and made mention of the same in several instances, which is the name given to the work in the title of a copy held at the Egyptian Book House. In addition, Sibt ibn al-Jawzi cites Ibn Hawqal on more than one occasion in Mirat al-Zaman, referring to his book as "Al-Aqaleem". Furthermore, this information is also found in Al-Suyuti's Hosn al-Muhadhirah fi al-Tarikh Misr wa al-Qahira (The History of Egypt and Cairo). A similar title is found in Copy 3012 in Topkapi, which begins with the words "Description of the Islamic regions and other provinces and the mountains and seas therein." Sibt Ibn al-Jawzi makes reference to it in another source as "Ajaeb al-Dunya wa Sefteha," which is also the title of Copy 2934 in Hagia Sophia.

== Ibn Hawqal's Methodology in Surat al-Ard ==
Ibn Hawqal's account of the Earth is informed by a particular method of reporting information. When he encounters a piece of news that he questions, he prefaces it with one of three introductory phrases: "They claim," "it is said," or "it is narrated." In addition to providing descriptions of countries and kingdoms, Ibn Hawqal also offered insights into their economies, political systems, and natural environments. The text provides a detailed account of the city's infrastructure, including its roads, routes, economic resources, markets, and production. It also offers insights into the city's urbanization process, the prevailing political situation, and the characteristics and customs of its inhabitants. Additionally, he was interested in accurately describing cities, including their commercial activities and facilities, as well as the relationship between their locations and climatic conditions. Nevertheless, in a manner similar to that of the classical Arab geographical school, he confined himself to delineating the boundaries of the "Islamic Regions." The book's scope was not limited to geography; rather, it encompassed a diverse array of scientific disciplines. Additionally, the book encompasses historical, biographical, mineralogical, ethnographic, archaeological, and numismatic content, with select chapters structured in the format of a tourist guide. Ibn Hawqal appropriated from Istakhri both the structure of the book and a portion of its content. A comparative analysis of the two texts reveals that Ibn Hawqal incorporated entire chapters from Istikhari, including sections on the Arabian peninsula, the Arabian Gulf, Khuzestan, Persia, Kerman, the Indus basin, Dilm, and the Caspian Sea. Although he added important but brief additions to it, additionally, he drew the majority of his research on Egypt, the Levant, Iraq, and Mesopotamia from him. Ibn Hawqal's ingenuity is most evident in the chapters on the Islamic West, which account for approximately 61 pages of his book.

Ibn Hawqal's work is distinguished by the incorporation of a dedicated map for each region he discussed. Moreover, his maps surpassed the precision of Istakhri's maps, exhibiting a distinctive and original approach that set them apart from the cartographic works of other geographers. However, he adopted the methodology of Muslim geographers, situating the south at the apex of the map. He commenced with the construction of a map entitled "The Picture of the Whole Earth," which depicted the known world of his era in a circular configuration, encompassed by the Ocean Sea on all sides. Additionally, he delineated the coastlines with linear and arc-shaped elements and depicted inland seas and islands with circular symbols.

== Ibn Hawqal's Sources ==
Ibn Hawqal drew upon a number of sources in his composition of Surat al-Ard, including Abu Zayd Ahmad ibn Sahl al-Balkhi's who died in 934 book Surat Al-Aqaleem, which consists primarily of maps accompanied by succinct annotations. The following books are of particular interest in this context: those of Muhammad ibn Khurdzaba, Qadama ibn Ja'far al-Kateb, Abu 'Uthman ibn Bahr al-Jahiz, and Istikhari's Al-Masalik al Mamalek. Additionally, his observations during his travels constituted a substantial repository of material for his book.

== Manuscripts and copies of the book ==
=== Manuscripts ===
Ibn Hawqal's book has a multitude of manuscripts dispersed among various libraries. In Istanbul, within the Topkapi Saray Museum, there is a manuscript dating back to 1086 AD and catalogued as 3346, which originated from the treasury of Sultan Ahmed. Another edition, No. 3347, and a third, No. 3012, copied in 867 AH/1463 AD, was attributed by Thomas Day Goodrich to Ibn Hawqal in an article in which he focused on the geographical maps contained in the Topkapi library. However, other scholars have attributed it to Istikhari because some of its chapters are similar to his work, especially the chapter on the Kerman region. Nevertheless, a number of other chapters lend support to the initial hypothesis. The author discusses the inhabitants of Upper Souss, their division into Maliki Sunnis and Shiites, the conflicts between the two enemies of Fez, and his description of his visit to Andalusia and Udagast. These topics are not addressed by Istikhari. Additionally, two manuscripts of the book are housed at the Süleymaniye Library in Istanbul. Hagia Sophia 2934 contains meticulously positioned maps and a comprehensive dedication to Sayf al-Dawla, Emir of Aleppo and Hagia Sophia 2577M which was copied in 711 AH-1311 AD. The Museum of Antiquities possesses a copy of the manuscript, designated as No. 573, comprising 103 pages. A further manuscript, entitled Al-Masalik wa-l-Mamalik (No. 2215-FB), is held at the King Faisal Center for Research and Islamic Studies. This manuscript also contains pages not included in the previous manuscript, No. 2216-FB.

In the Leiden University Library in the Netherlands, there is a manuscript bearing the title Surat al-Ard and the catalog number Or. 314, copied on 23 Safar 926 (February 13, 1520). A second copy, numbered 2214, is held by the National Library in Paris. This was created in 849 AH (1445 AD), and represents an abbreviation of the text of copy 3346 in Istanbul. It includes a number of additional sections covering the period from 534 AH (1139 AD) to 580 AH (1184 AD). Additionally, a copy is housed in the Bodleian Library at Oxford University (Huntington 538). A fragment of the book, No. 3/800, titled Kitab al-Baladan, is housed in the Biblioteca Ambrosiana in Milan, Italy. It bears the computer number 12/14 and is written in Mashriqi script.

Additionally, there are other manuscripts that are primarily photocopies of previous manuscripts, including: A copy of the work, entitled The Book of Countries, is located in the Film Microfilm Library at the Department of Manuscripts at the Islamic University, catalogued as No. 800/3. The Doha Library in Qatar has two copies of the same item, one titled Description of the Islamic Regions and Others (No. F 374) and the other titled Kingdoms and Tracts (No. F 375). The former is from manuscript No. 3012 in the library of Ahmed III, while the latter is from Ahmed III, 30 Geography. Additionally, the Egyptian National Library and Archives has a copy comprising 273 illustrated pages and the 258th volume of the Geography series. Another, No. 259, is entitled "The Forms of the Earth's Forms and Their Magnitude in Longitude and Latitude," which is more commonly known as "Geography." This field of study encompasses the form and description of the Earth's forms, their magnitude in longitude and latitude, and the drawing thereof. Additionally, it includes the examination of countries and their regions, as well as the urbanization of Muslim countries. The presentation of relevant images is also a crucial aspect of this field of study. It is an exemplar of the Topkapi manuscript. The National Library of France possesses a copy of the Leiden manuscript, catalogued as number 2215.

=== Copies ===
As there are numerous manuscripts of the book, there are also a multitude of versions of the book.

- The earliest extant version is dated approximately 355 AH (966 AD) and is based on manuscript Topkapi No. 3012.
- The 356 AH-967 AD copy is purported to have been dedicated to Sayf al-Dawla and is based on manuscripts. The relevant manuscripts are Hagia Sophia 2934, Topkapi 3347, and Paris 2214. This copy incorporates digressions and updates to passages of the original text, which may have been made by one or more authors from the 12th century AD. These updates concern the period between 540 and 580 AH, and also include intellectual amendments. For example, in other manuscripts, the phrase "Amir al-Mu'minin Ali (peace be upon him)" has been altered to "Amir al-Mu'minin Ali ibn Abi Talib (may Allah be pleased with him)." However, these ideological adjustments remain isolated and do not justify other anachronisms present in the text. Furthermore, evidence suggests that Ibn Hawqal himself participated in the editing of this version, specifically in the passage where he discusses Byzantine control of Aleppo. Ibn Hawqal did not offer an opinion regarding the incident. However, in the latest version, the passage has been modified to include a scathing criticism of Sayf al-Dawla, attributing the fall of Aleppo to "Sayf al-Dawla's mismanagement and his sickness."
- The anti-Fatimid version was produced between 972 and 976 AD. The text is based on the Leiden and Bodleian manuscripts.
- The final version, dating from 979 AD, is based on manuscript 3346. Hagia Sophia 2577M.

== Criticism ==
Surat al-Ard has been subjected to similar criticism or praise as other literary works. In his book, History of Arabic Geographical Literature, the Russian orientalist Krachkovsky asserts that the book's material is presented accurately and in detail, while elucidating some essential points. Ahmed Ramadan Ahmed posited that the author's writing style is distinguished by a notable degree of ease and clarity. His sentences are concise and direct, devoid of poetic devices such as rhyme or metaphor. In his research, Dr. Fawzi Marwan Mansouri characterizes the maps of the Earth's image as "independent of Greek and Roman foreign influence and belonging to the maps of the renewed Islamic school." Nevertheless, Ibn Hawqal's work has been subjected to criticism for failing to provide specific names, omitting details regarding lengths and widths, and focusing exclusively on the largest Islamic countries, while only briefly mentioning others. Additionally, he has been accused of committing errors and perpetuating misconceptions due to his reliance on first-hand observations and second-hand accounts without sufficient verification or scrutiny. His account of Sicily is regarded as one of the most scarce and intriguing testimonies in Arabic geographical literature, offering a unique insight into the island's everyday life despite the challenging circumstances under which it was written. Ibn Hawqal was quite critical of Sicily, citing the prevalence of mosques and describing the local teachers as uninformed and misguided. He also asserted that many of them engaged in teaching as a means of evading jihad. Additionally, he expressed strong disapproval of the people of Andalusia and their knights, portraying them as inferior. He presented a critical portrayal of the Andalusians and their military and administrative system, expressing astonishment at their ability to maintain independence until that point without being subject to the authority of the Islamic Levant. Ibn Said al-Andalusi offered a response in defense of the people of Andalusia. "I saw no reason to substantiate this chapter, despite the fact that my countrymen have been subjected to injustice and intolerance, which are not veiled. The language employed in the response is more eloquent than that of rhetoric. I question whether the people of this island have lost their faculties, opinions, spirits, and courage. They have managed it with their opinions and minds while observing its neighboring enemies for over five hundred years and protecting it with their valour from the nations with which they are connected, both within and outside of their territory." Nevertheless, his description of Andalusia represents the first plausible yet comprehensive and coherent account of the region.

== Editions and translations ==
=== Editions ===
The book was printed in Leiden by the Academic Press in 1822 AD and comprised 194 pages. The introduction, written in Latin, occupied 14 pages. In 1873 AD, the orientalist De Khoie published the book in Leiden under the title Tracts and Kingdoms. This was the second part of the Arab Geographical Library series, relying on copies from the Leiden and Oxford treasuries, as well as a copy from the Paris National Bookstore, which he called the Parisian compendium. In 1938, the orientalist Kramers published another edition at the Brill Press in Leiden, relying on the copy of the Antique Serai Treasury in Istanbul, the De Goeje edition, and some other sources. This edition was titled Surat al-Ard. In 1926 AD, the Adolf Helzhausen Press published in Vienna an edition titled Surat al-Ard from Cities, Mountains, Seas, Islands and Rivers. This edition was produced under the care and correction of Hans von Muzik. In the same year, an illustrated offset edition was published in Baghdad. The book was first printed in Beirut by Dar al-Sadr in 1938. Subsequently, in 1992, another edition was published by Al-Hayat Library. An additional edition was published by Dar al-Kitab al-Islami, the date of publication of which is currently unknown. In Egypt, the Nawabag Al-Fikr Company published the inaugural edition of the book in 2009.

=== Translations ===
Ibn Hawqal's oriental geography was first published in London in 1800. The English edition was translated by Sir Willem Uzzelli from an earlier Persian version. The book was translated into French by Kramers and Veit and published in Beirut and Paris in 1964 and 1965 under the title Configuration de la Terre. Additionally, the book was translated into Turkish by Ramazan Sisin and published in Istanbul in 2017 under the title Islamic Geography in the Tenth Century (Turkish: 10. Asırda İslam Coğrafyası).

=== Partial editions ===
There are partial editions in which only parts of the book were published:

- In his 1822 Leiden publication, Orientalist Hamaker's study, entitled "Kholasat Akhbar Almosafer wa Aljam, fi Marefat Belad Iraq Alajam", focused on the non-Arab Iraqi population.
- The section on Sindh was published in Bonn in 1838, accompanied by a Latin translation.
- The section pertaining to Sajestan was published by the Orientalist Régis Blachère in his book. In 1932, the Monuments of Medieval Arab Geographers was published in Beirut. This work presents selections from the aforementioned texts in Arabic, with footnotes and notes in French.
- The section of the text pertaining to Africa is entitled: A French translation of Ibn Hawqal's Description de l'Afrique, translated by Baron McGuckin de Slane and printed in Paris in 1842.
- The section of the text pertaining to the capital of the island of Sicily, Palermo, entitled Description de Palerme (French: Description de Palerme au milieu du Xe siècle de l'ère vulgaire), was printed by the Italian orientalist Amari, with a French translation, at the Royal Press in Paris in 1845.
- Surat al-Ard,Special part of Morocco and Spain (Spanish: Configuración del mundo; fragmentos al Magreb y España) is a Spanish translation published in 1971.

== Books with the same name ==
Ibn Hawqal's book is known by two names: Surat al-Ard and Al-Masalik wa-l-Mamalik. There are additional works that share the names as well.

=== Surat al-Ard ===
The term "Surat al-Ard (Image of the Earth)" is derived from the Arabic translation of the Greek word "geography." Among the books bearing this title is a work by Abu Musa Al-Khwarizmi, a copy of which is housed in the National Academic Library (Strasbourg) in France. Additionally, Abu Zayd al-Balkhi's Surat al-Ard, which has been designated by some as the Surat Al-Aqaleem, is worthy of mention. A treatise by Thābit ibn Qurra al-Harani. The image of the land is by Ishaq ibn al-Hasan al-Qurtubi, also known as Ibn al-Zayyat. It is a copy of No. 1/408 of 41 leaves from the Burdur Library in Turkey.

=== Al-Masalik wa-l-Mamalik ===
There are numerous books that bear the names of Al-Masalik wa-l-Mamalik. Some even posit that it constitute a science that is more closely aligned with descriptive geography. This science originated during the Abbasid era, when the compilers and bookkeepers amassed data on various geographical features, including roads, tracts, revenue, imports, expenditures, and place names. Ibn Khordadbeh's Al-Masalik wa-l-Mamalik, which he authored in 232 AH/846 AD, represents the inaugural publication in this field of study. De Goeje, an orientalist, posited that Ibn al-Nadim indicated that Ja'far ibn Ahmad al-Marwazi, who perished in 274 AH, was the inaugural author to compose a treatise on maslak and mamlak, though he did not conclude it. Additionally, there is a group of compilers who have authored books bearing the same title, including: Additionally, Ahmad ibn al-Tayyib al-Sarakhsi, Ahmad ibn al-Harith al-Khazzaz, and al-Jayhani, the vizier of the owner of Khorasan, are also notable contributors to this field. Al-Bashari al-Maqdisi posits that his book is based on the work of Ibn Khardzaba and incorporates its entirety. Nevertheless, he acknowledges the latter's eminence in this field and frequently cites him as a source on specific matters with also Abu Muhammad al-Hasan al-Hamdani, known as Ibn al-Hayyak (d. 334 AH). Abu Ubaydallah al-Bakri, who copied the title and excerpts of his book from Muhammad ibn Yusuf al-Warraq, as well as Istakhari, known as Ibrahim al-Farisi al-Karkhi (died 346 AH / 957 AD), whose book, according to De Goeje, is a copy of Abu Zayd al-Balkhi's book (d. 346 AH / 957 AD). Nevertheless, some parties have raised objections to this matter and have highlighted the discrepancies between the two books in question. Additionally, al-Hasan ibn Ahmad al-Mahlabi al-Azizi and his book are also referred to as al-Kitab al-Azizi, as he compiled it for Azizullah al-Fatimi and attributed it to him. Furthermore, al-Marrakshi, as Ibn al-Wardi al-Hafid noted, authored a book entitled Al-Masalik wa-l-Mamalik, in addition to Abdullah bin Hamweh al-Sarkhsi (d. 640 A.H.).

== Studies about the book ==
In the academic literature on Ibn Hawqal's book, several studies and books have been published including:

- A book by Saad Abboud Samar titled: Ibn Hawqal, A Historical Study in his book Surat al-Ard, was published by Dar Tammuz for Printing, Publishing, and Distribution in Damascus in 2017.
- A book by researcher Ibrahim Ibrahim entitled: "The Kurds and their homes in Ibn Hawqul's Surat al-Ard". Printed in 2020 in Sweden.

== Photo gallery ==
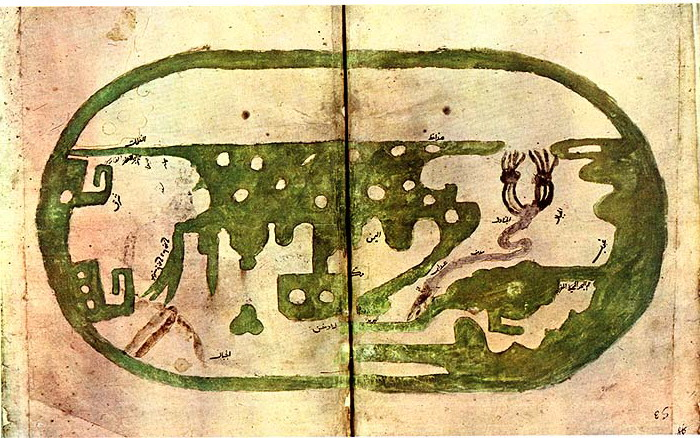
From Ibn Hawqul's maps

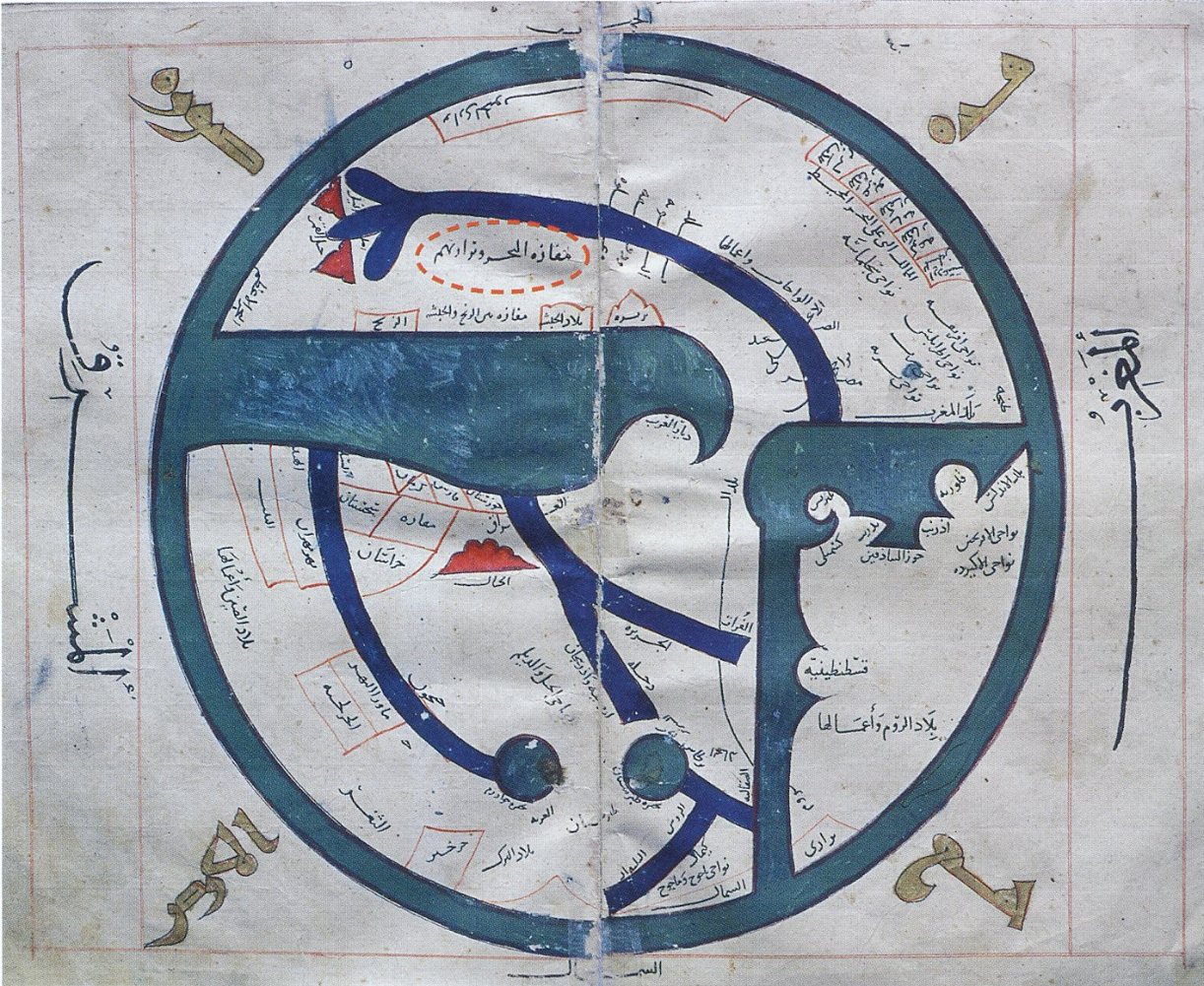
World map (all-terrain image), from Hagia Sophia copy 2577.

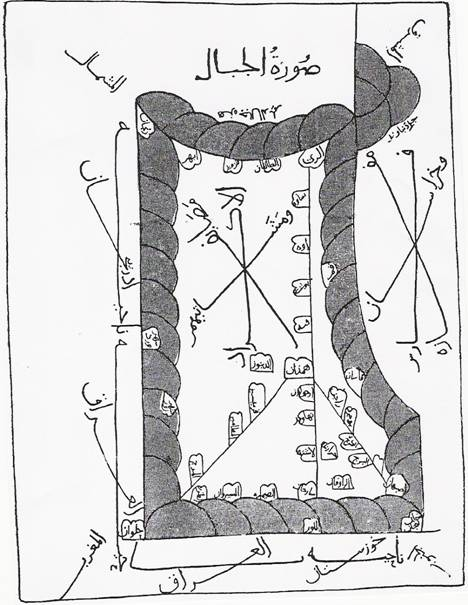
Map of Kurdistan

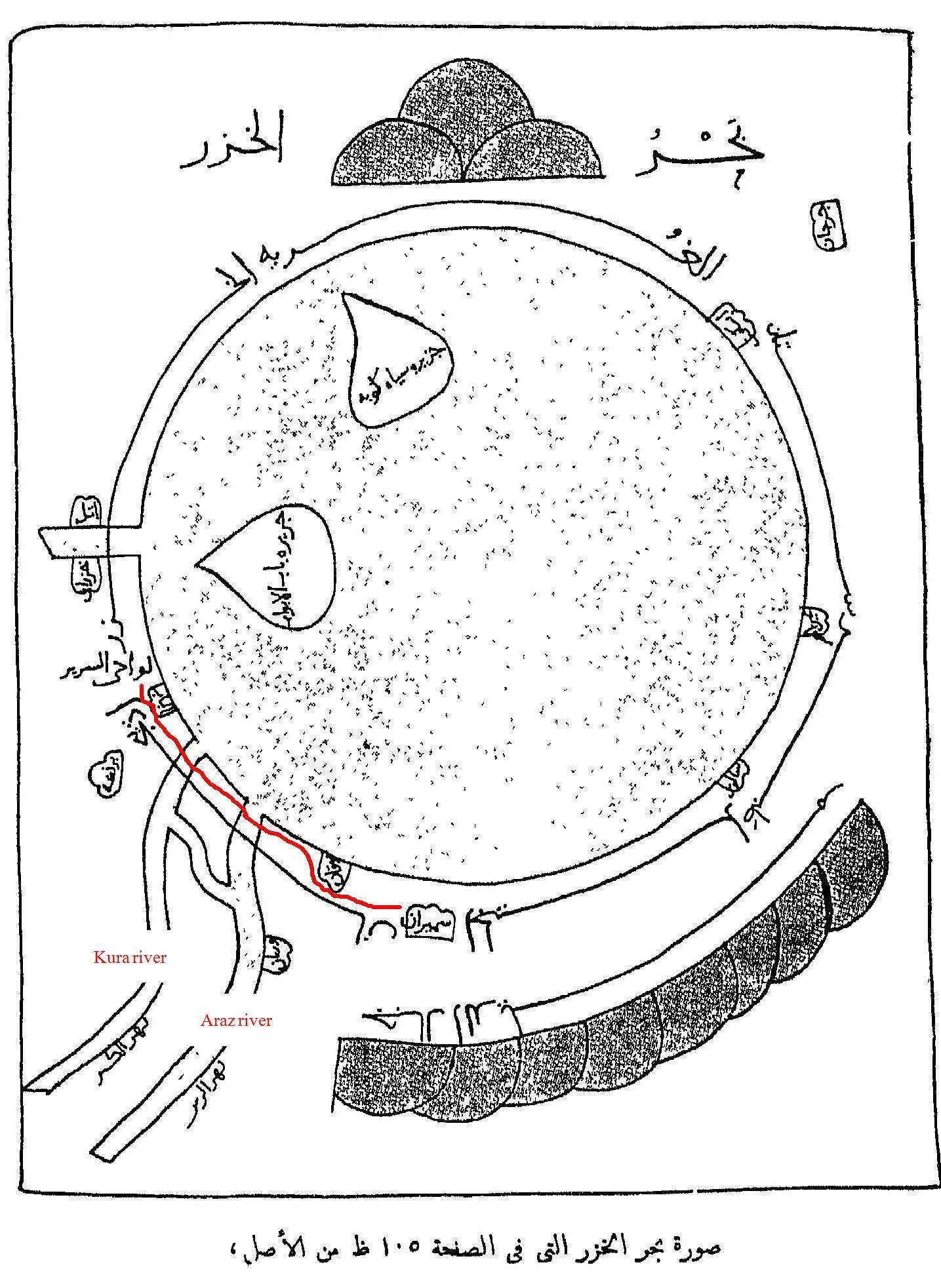
Map of the Caspian Sea.

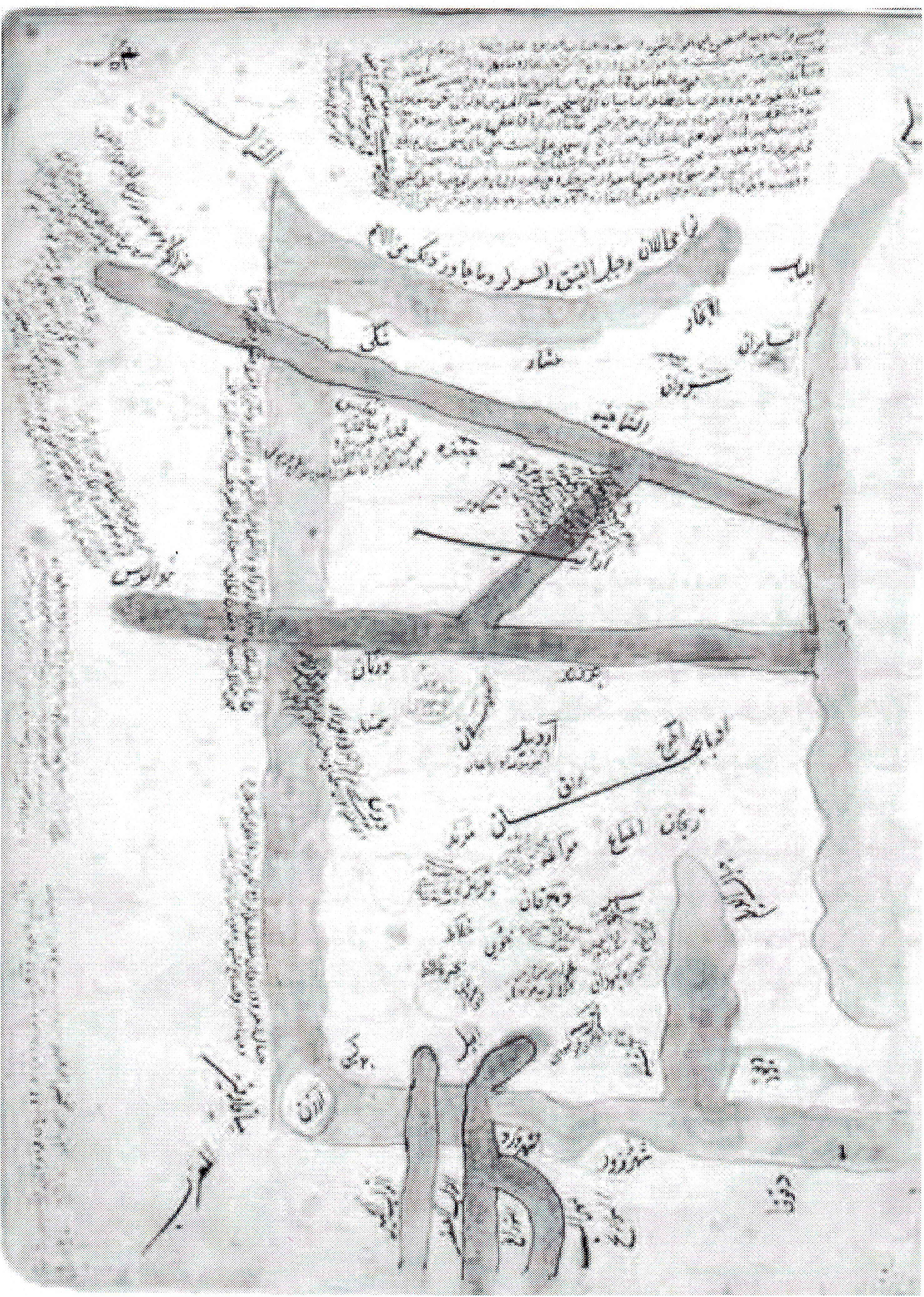
Map of Armenia and Azerbaijan

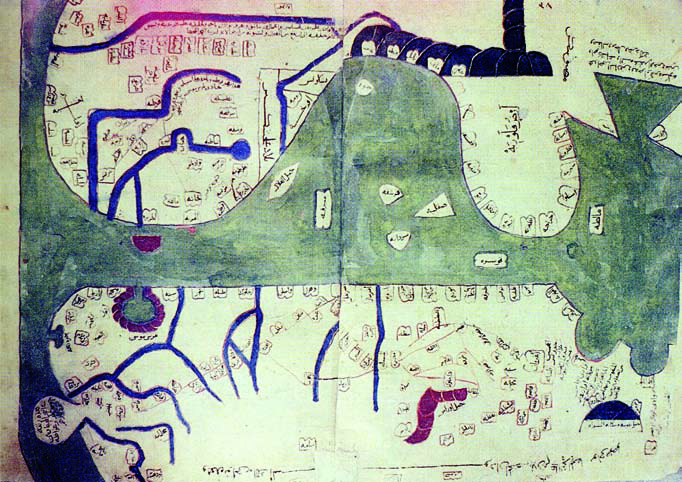
Map of Morocco

== See also ==
- Tabula Rogeriana.
