= Bibliothèque orientale =

Work by Barthélemy d'Herbelot

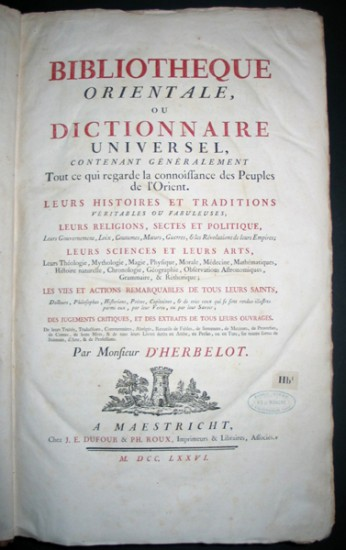
Title page from a 1776 edition of the Bibliothèque orientale

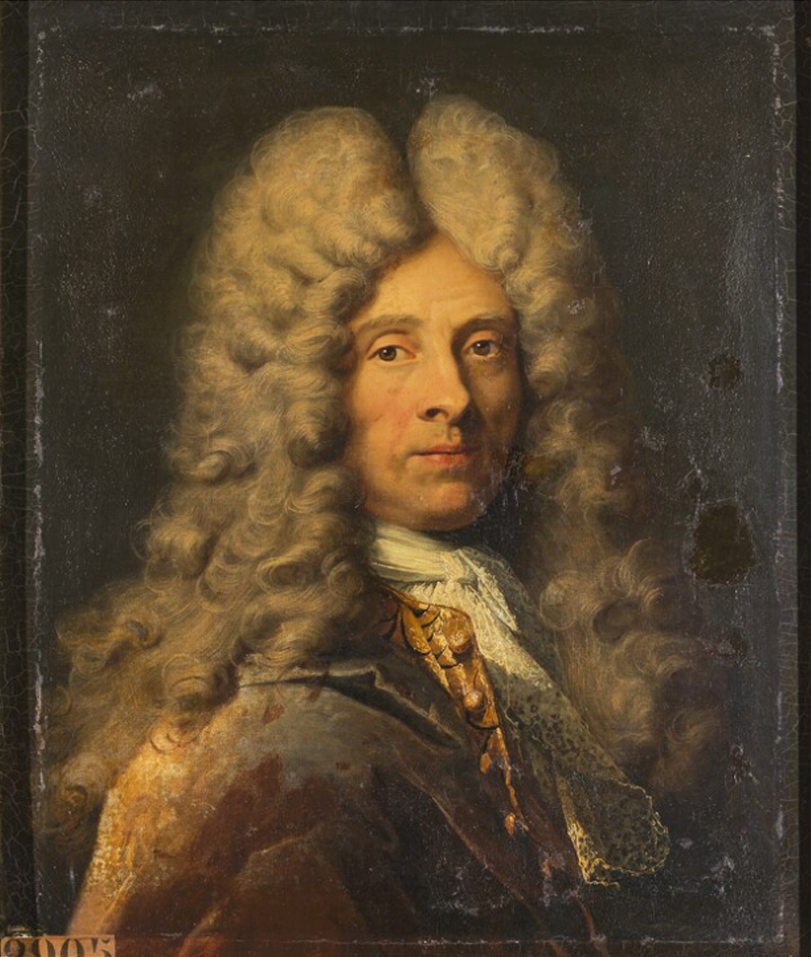
Portrait of Barthélemy d'Herbelot

The Bibliothèque orientale, ou Dictionnaire universel contenant tout ce qui regarde les connaissances des peuples de l'Orient (French for 'Oriental Library, or Universal Dictionary Containing Everything Relating to the Knowledge of the Peoples of the Orient'), better known as the Bibliothèque orientale (French: [biblijɔtɛk ɔʁjɑ̃tal]), is a reference work on Islamic civilization compiled by Barthélemy d'Herbelot and first published posthumously by Antoine Galland in 1697.

Comprising 8,158 alphabetically arranged articles, the Bibliothèque orientale was, according to Alexander Bevilacqua, "by far the most ambitious and encompassing creation to date" in early modern European scholarship on the Islamic world, and "a massive act of translation" which "brought hundreds of Arabic, Persian and Turkish books to the attention of European readers for the first time." As worded by Georg Lehner, "the Bibliothèque Orientale remained one of the most important reference works on Arabic-Islamic civilization up to the early nineteenth century."

== Composition ==
D'Herbelot drew heavily on the Kashf al-Zunun of the Ottoman Katib Çelebi. Bevilacqua argues that Katib Çelebi's bibliography provided "not just content but inspiration for the organization" of d'Herbelot's work.

The volume includes no Arabic script; all Arabic, Persian, and Turkish terms are rendered in French transliteration. According to Georg Lehner, "the exclusive use of oriental terms as lemmas shows the reluctance to classify the material according to 'Western' categories."

== Publication history ==
D'Herbelot died in 1695, before the work was published. It was subsequently edited and prepared for publication by Antoine Galland, who would later become famous for translating One Thousand and One Nights into French.

The Bibliothèque orientale was published in Paris in folio format in 1697, comprising 1,059 pages and 8,158 articles, preceded by a "Discours pour servir de préface" written by Galland.

The work was reprinted several times during the 18th century. A supplementary volume titled Supplément à la Bibliothèque orientale de Monsieur d'Herbelot appeared in 1780 and included contributions by Claude Visdelou and Galland.

== Significance and reception ==
Quoting Georg Lehner,

Throughout Europe, the Bibliothèque Orientale remained one of the most important reference works on Arabic-Islamic civilization up to the early nineteenth century. This may not only be seen from its use by leading eighteenth-century European scholars, but also from the fact that it was the only reference (for many entries e.g. in Zedler's Universal-Lexicon) dealing with the history of the Mongol empire. The impact of this work on the 'republic of letters' is shown by the fact, that Pierre Bayle had mentioned it in the preface of the first edition of his Dictionnaire historique. Moreover, a comparison of the editions of Moréri's Grand dictionnaire historique preceding and following the publication of the Bibliothèque Orientale illustrates the immediate influence on this work on general and encyclopaedic reference works.

Bevilacqua notes that "the Bibliothèque Orientale, which among other words introduced the term 'Islam' into French, irreversibly changed the way in which Europeans looked at Muslim lands."

Robert Irwin has described the Bibliothèque orientale as having been "a precursor of the modern Encyclopaedia of Islam and as such a landmark in the history of orientalism."

== Sources ==
- Amir-Moezzi, Mohammad Ali; Scheid, John (2000). L'Orient dans l'histoire religieuse de l'Europe (in French).
- Bevilacqua, Alexander (2016). "How to Organise the Orient: D'Herbelot and the Bibliothèque Orientale". Journal of the Warburg and Courtauld Institutes. 79. doi:10.1086/JWCI26322524.
- Lehner, Georg (2011). China in European Encyclopaedias, 1700–1850.
- Raleigh, Tegan (2017). "The Thousand and First Author: Thomas-Simon Gueullette's Repeating Fictions". The Canadian Review of Comparative Literature. 44 (4).
- Irwin, Robert (2025). "Rendering the strange familiar: Orientalist appropriations of Sufism". In Yazaki, Saeko; Conway, Michael (eds.). Sufism and Zen in the West.
