= Kemaleddin Mehmed =

16th c. Ottoman historian

Taşköprüzade Ahmet

Personal details
- Born: 1553
- Died: 22 August 1621 (aged 67–68)
- Parent: Taşköprüzade Ahmet (father)
- Family: Taşköprü

Kemaleddin Mehmed (1553 – 22 August 1621) was an Ottoman scholar.

== Biography ==
He was born in Istanbul, Ottoman Empire, into the Taşköprü family. He was thought by his father, the well-known Ottoman historian Taşköprüzade. He also studied with Sheikh Hafiz Ahmed Bukhari and Mahmud Hudayi.

He was professor in several madrasahs. In April 1576 he was appointed professor in Unkapanı. In October 1585 he reached the rank of Haseki Madrasa. He then worked as a judge. Kemaleddin Mehmed was judge in Thessaloniki in May 1591. He was then judge of Üsküdar in Cemâziyelevvel (February 1593). He later became the judge of Aleppo, and Damascus (June 1596). He was again judge in Aleppo, and in Bursa. He was appointed judge in Cairo in the winter of 1598, but before he got there his post was changed back to Bursa. In March 1599 he became judge in Galata. In February–March 1600 he was again appointed judge in Thessaloniki. In May 1603 he became judge in his place of birth, Istanbul.

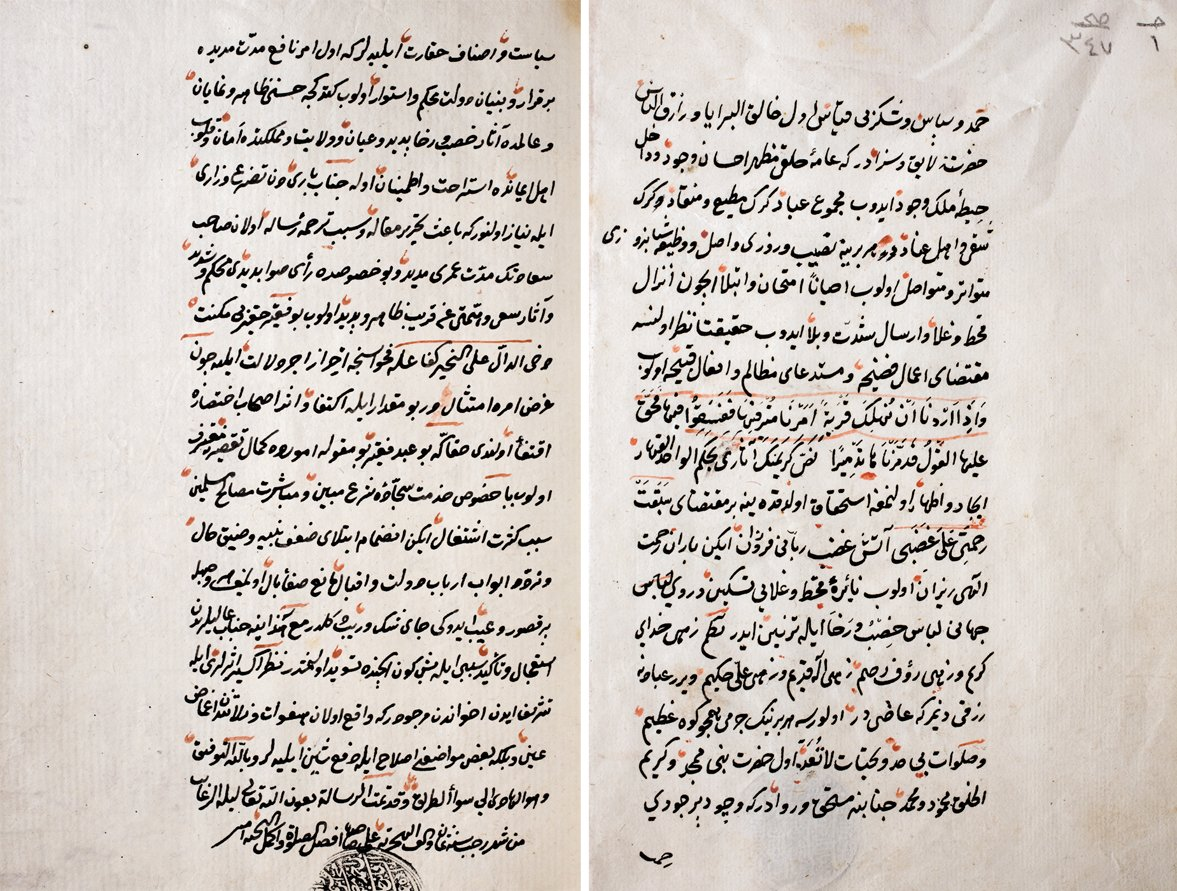
First and last pages of Kemâleddin Efendi's translation of Al-Maqrizi's Târîh-i Kaht-ı Mısır

He was appointed to the Anatolian kazasker in Cemâziyelevvel 1012 (October 1603) and went to Hungary with the army. He was given the Gallipoli country as an estate in 1612. In October 1615 he became Rumelia kazasker for the second time. He remained in this position until April 1617. In January 1621 he was again named kazasker of Rumelia. During his third appointment in Rumelia, he gave a fatwa that was criticized.

== Work ==
Kemâleddin Efendi produced and translated many works, some in Arabic. He translated and expanded with additions his father's work and printed the first Ottoman Encyclopedia, Mevzuatii l-ulum.

Among his other works there are the translations of Risale-i Hüseyin Vâiz and Hadith-i Erbaîn, written in verse and prose. They are in a uniform style and have annotations. He also produced Kasîde-i Bür' e Tahmî and Sûre-i Kehf. Another work, the Târîh-i Sâf is often attributed to him, however, it was actually produced by another author.

Kemaleddin had five sons. He taught his son-in-law Abdullah Efendi, who got a mulazam from Ebussuud Efendi.
