= Taşköprü family =

Prominent family of Ottomans of the 15th–17th centuries

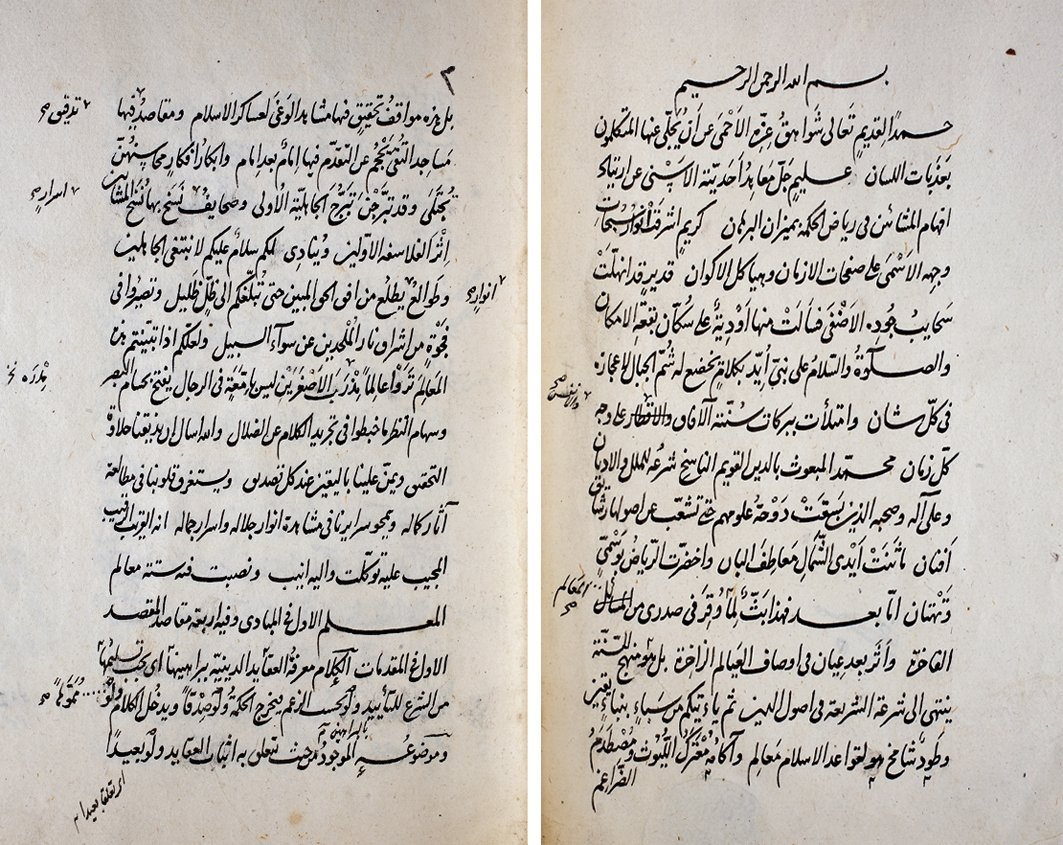
First two pages of Taşköprüzade's el-Meʿâlim fî ʿilmi'l-kelâm

The Taşköprü family is a Turkish family that rose to prominence in the Ottoman Empire for the important scholars, judges and artists it produced.

Many important historians and teachers were born in this family. They were a center of ulama, training other prominent scholars.

Among the best known members of the family is Taşköprülüzade İsameddin Ahmed bin Mustafa, better known as Taşköprüzade, famous for his great biographic encyclopedia. Taşköprüzade's father, Muslih al-Din Mustafa, was a noted scholar, the teacher of the Ottoman Sultan Selim I. Muslih al-Din Mustafa was the director of a medrese in Taşköprü, from which fact his son's name was derived. Ahmet (Taşköprüzade) was trained by his father, and later completed his edcutation in Constantinople.

While several members of them family became judges, they are said to have preferred to act as müderris. They also made significant contributions in the fields of poetry, literature and calligraphy.

== History ==
The family originates from Taşköprü, Kastamonu. According to Taşköprüzade, a member of the family, they trace their origin to Central Asia. They were forced to migrate due to Genghis Khan's westward campaigns. They passed Afghanistan and Iran, and settled in Taşköprü. The first famous member of the family is Hayreddin Halil Efendi b. Kāsım b. Hacı Safâ'dır (died in 1474–75). He was first educated in Kastamonu, then completed his education in Bursa and Edirne. Hayreddin then returned to his native Taşköprü, where he became a professor. He was professor at the Muzafferiye Madrasa. Sultan Mehmed invited him to the madrasa he had founded, the Sahn Madrasa. However, Hayreddin didn't leave his native Taşköprü. He married the sister of Muhyiddin Mehmed Efendi, a scholar from Niksar. They had two sons, Muslihuddin Mustafa and Kıvâmüddin Kasım. Both of them were part of the ilmiye.

Kıvâmüddin, born in 1462–63, received a good education and worked with the likes of Molla Lutfî and his well-known nephew. He worked as a professor in several madrasahs. He was also a calligrapher, and trained with Sheikh Hamdullah. He copied several works for Sultan Bayezid, and left a treatise He died in 1513, while a professor at İnegöl İshak Pasha Madrasa.

Kıvâmüddin's son Sheikh Mehmed Efendi rose to the position of sahn. Kıvâmüddin's other son, İbrahim Efendi, was a professor and a judge, and worked as a judge in Anatolia and Rumelia. He died in Mecca in 1657 and was buried in Jannat al-Mu'alla. Ibrahim's son Ahmed Efendi was a ilmye who became a professor in Süleymaniye Darülhadisi. He was appointed Judge of Aleppo, but died shortly after he took charge, in 1665. Ibrahim's other son Yahyâ Çelebi was professor in several madrashas. Yahyâ Çelebi died in 1669.

Muslih al-Din Mustafa was born in 1453. He was the teacher of the Ottoman Sultan Selim I. Muslih al-Din Mustafa was a judge in Aleppo and the director of a medrese in Taşköprü, from which fact his son's name was derived. Muslih also wrote poetry, under the pen name of "Hilmi" and left, among other things, a treatise on the science of ferâiz. He died in 1529. Muslih al-Din Mustafa had two sons, İsâmüddin Ahmed (the famous Taşköprizade) and Nizameddin Mehmed. Both his sons were part of the ilmiye. However, Nizameddin Mehmed died in young age. Ahmet (Taşköprüzade) was trained by his father, and later completed his edcutation in Constantinople.

Taşköprüzade was active as a teacher in Skopje, Edirne, and Dimetoka. In Edirne he thought in the medrese of Üç Şerefeli Mosque at first. Later, he was appointed the manager of Sultan Bayezid II's medical medrese. A member of the Khalwati order, in 1551 he became the qadi of Constantinople. However, his eyesight failing, he had to retire three years later.

Taşköprüzade's son Kemaleddin Mehmed translated and expanded with additions his father's work and printed the first Ottoman Encyclopedia, Mevzuatii l-ulum. Kemaleddin had five sons. He taught his son-in-law Abdullah Efendi, who got a mulazam from Ebussuud Efendi.

Taşköprüzade's other son Abu Hâmid Mehmed Efendi was a tutor of Ebussuud Efendi. He was going to become the judge of Haremeyn, but died of plague in Hama in 1597. He was buried in the grave of Azeri Çelebi.

== Members ==
- Hayreddin Halil Efendi b. Kāsım b. Hacı Safâ'dır (died in 1474–75)
  - Kıvâmüddin Kasım (b. 1462-63 - died in 1513)
    - Sheikh Mehmed Efendi
    - İbrahim Efendi (died in 1657)
      - Ahmed Efendi
  - Muslihuddin Mustafa (b. 1453 - died in 1529)
    - Nizameddin Mehmed
    - Taşköprülüzade Ahmet (1494 - 1561)
      - Abu Hâmid Mehmed Efendi
      - Kemaleddin Mehmed (1553-1621)
        - Kemaleddin's five sons
