= Kâtip Çelebi =

Ottoman polymath (1609–1657)

- كاتب جلبي

Personal life
- Born: Muṣṭafa ibn 'Abd Allāh; February 1609 Istanbul, Ottoman Empire
- Died: 26 September 1657 (aged 48) Istanbul, Ottoman Empire
- Era: Ottoman era
- Main interest(s): History of Civilisation, geography, cartography, science, medicine, Fiqh (Islamic Jurisprudence), Kalam (Islamic theology), Philosophy (particularly Illuminationism), Tafsir, Sufism
- Notable work: Kaşf az-Zunūn ‘an 'asāmī ‘l-Kutub wa-l’fanūn (كشف الظنون عن أسامي الكتب والفنون)
- Known for: Ottoman universal (bibliographic-biographic-historical-geographic-scientific) encyclopedias.
- Other names: Haji Kalfa, Hacı Halife
- Occupation: Bureaucrat, Historian, Muslim Scholar

Religious life
- Religion: Islam
- Denomination: Sunni
- Jurisprudence: Hanafi
- Creed: Sunni Kalam - Ishraqi Philosophical Syncretism

Muslim leader
- Influenced by: Ali Qushji, Al-Sharif al-Jurjani, Shihabuddin Suhrawardi

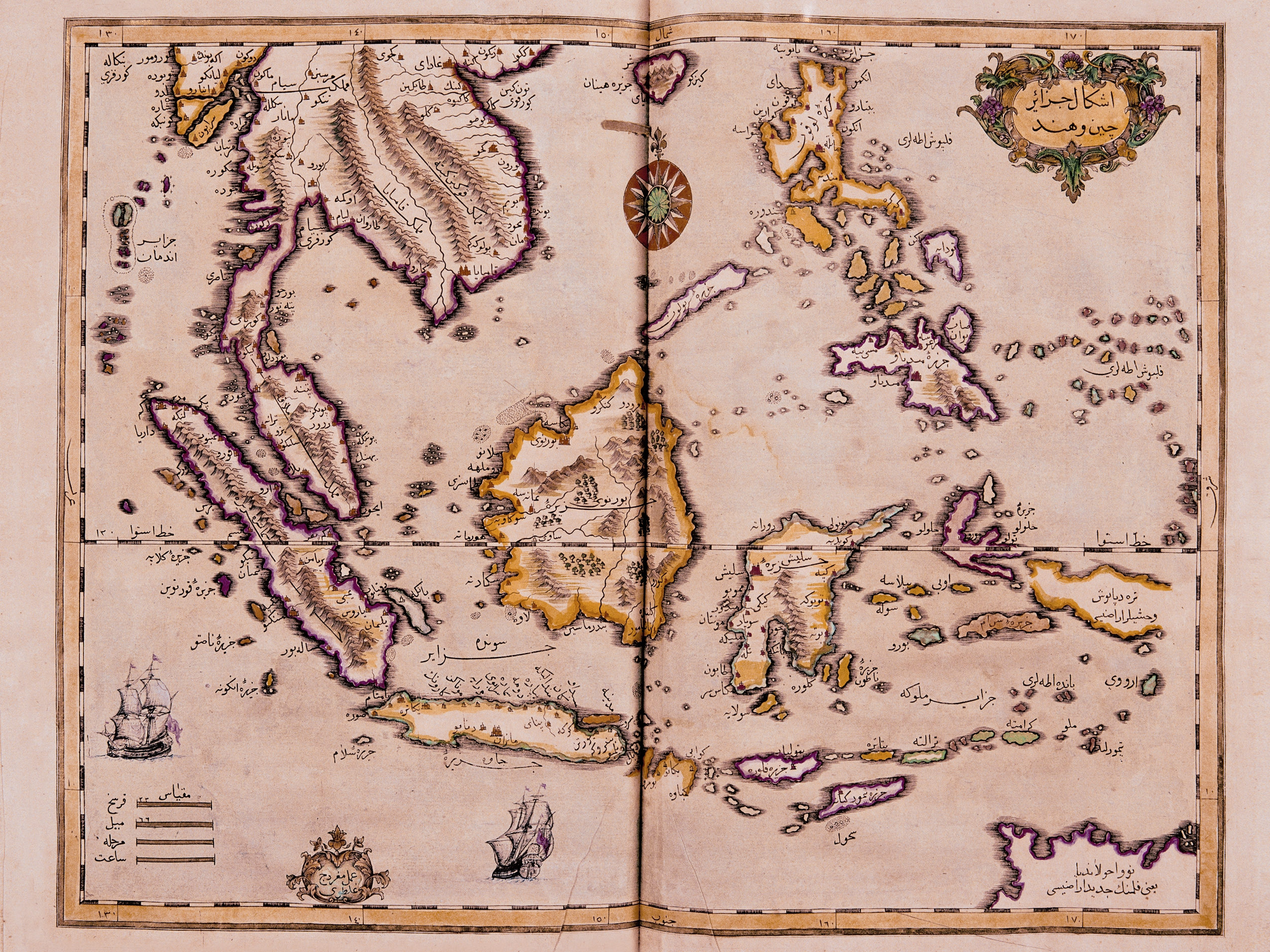
1728 map of the Indian Ocean and the Chinese Sea by Ibrahim Müteferrika, one of a series that illustrated Katip Çelebi's Universal Geography, the first printed atlas in the Islamic world.

Mustafa ibn Abdullah, known with the pen name Kâtip Çelebi (Note: 'Kâtip Çelebi' translates loosely as "Gentleman Scribe".) (كاتب جلبي) or Ḥājjī Khalīfa (حاجي خليفة) (Note: Numerous variants and spellings of his pen-names are found. Among the most common of these: Kātib Çelebi, Katib Tchélébi, ‘Abdallāh Kātib Jelebi, Chalabi; Hâcci Halfa (Turkish: Hacı Halife), Muṣṭafa Ben Hājī Khalīfah, Haji Khalifa, Hajji Khalifeh, Hazi Halife, Hadschi Chalfa, Khalfa, Kalfa, etc.) (1017 AH/1609 CE – 1068 AH/1657 CE) was a Turkish polymath and author of the 17th-century Ottoman Empire. He compiled a vast universal bibliographic encyclopaedia of books and sciences, the Kaşf az-Zunūn, and wrote many treatises and essays. “A deliberate and impartial historian… of extensive learning”, Franz Babinger hailed him "the greatest encyclopaedist among the Ottomans."

Writing with equal facility in Alsina-i Thalātha—the three languages of Ottoman imperial administration, Arabic, Turkish and Persian – principally in Arabic and then in Turkish, his native tongue— he also collaborated on translations from French and Latin. The German orientalist Gustav Flügel published Kaşf az-Zunūn in the original Arabic with parallel Latin translation, entitled Lexicon Bibliographicum et Encyclopaedicum (7 vols.) (Note: Critical edition with Arabic text and parallel Latin translation and commentary in six volumes (1835-1858) (digitized).) The orientalist Barthélemy d'Herbelot produced a French edition of the Kaşf az-Zunūn principally with additional material, in the great compendium, Bibliothèque orientale.

== Life ==
He was born Muṣṭafa ibn 'Abd Allāh (مصطفى بن عبد الله) in Istanbul in February 1609 (Dhu’l-Qa‘da 1017 AH). His father was a sipahi (cavalryman) and silāhdār (sword bearer) of the Sublime Porte and secretary in the Anadolı muhasebesi (Anatolian finance accountancy) in Istanbul. His mother came from a wealthy Istanbul family. From age five or six he began learning the Qur’ān, Arabic grammar and calligraphy, and at the age of 14 his father found him a clerical position in the imperial financial bureaucracy. He excelled in penmanship, accountancy and siyāqat ("Treasury cipher"). (Note: Siyāqat was a particular crabbed script used by financial administration of Ottoman Empire.) As the accountant of the commissariat department of the Ottoman army in Anatolia, he fought alongside his father on the Terjan campaign (1624) and in the failed expedition to recapture Baghdād from Persian control in 1625. On the return home his father died at Mosul, and his uncle died a month later. In 1626–1627 he was at the siege of Erzurum.

Çelebi had a love of learning from his father, and on his return to Istanbul in 1628 he attended the sermons of the charismatic preacher Qādīzāde, who inspired him to resume his studies. An inheritance allowed him to settle permanently in Istanbul. He continued for 34 years, interrupted only for military service on campaigns to Baghdād (1629) and Hamadan (1630). In 1633 he left his corps' winter quarters in Aleppo to make the Hajj, earning the title Hajji. He rejoined the imperial army at Diyarbakr, where he associated with scholars. He took part in the recapture of Erivan by Sultan Murad IV, and expeditions to Tabriz and Baghdād (1629-1631).

On his return in 1635 to Istanbul, Mehmed Kalfa, an old associate of his father's, secured him an apprentice position as Khalifa (second clerk), in the Audit Office of the Cavalry. He later obtained a post in the head office of the Commissariat Department. In 1645 a legacy left to him by a wealthy relative enabled him to dedicate himself full-time to scholarship and acquire books. With his master and friend A'rej Mustafa Efendi, he studied the commentary of al-Baydawi, The Roots of Law, commentaries on Ashkāl al-ta’sīs (Ideal Forms), (Note: Shams al-Dīn Muḥammad ibn Ashraf al-Samarqandī's geometry on the 35 propositions of Euclid.) al-Mulakhkhas (Summary) of Chaghmīnī, (Note: Mulakhkhas by Mahmūd ibn Muḥammad al-Chaghmīnī of Khwarazm was a work on astronomy.) ‘arūd (prosody) of Andalusī, and Ulugh Beg’s Zīj (Almanac). He also attended the ders-i 'amm (lecturers), Kurd 'Abd Allāh Efendi at Ayia Sophia and Kechi Mehmed Efendi at the Suleymānīye. In 1642, in order to carry on the chain of oral teaching, he attended Veli Efendi's lectures on the Nukhba, the Alfiya, (Note: Nukhbat al-fikr mustalah ahl al-ithr by al-Hāfiz Shihāb al-Dīn Aḥmad ibn ‘Alī al-‘Asqalānī (d.852/1448); Alfīyat al-‘Irāqī fī usūl al-hadith by al-Hāfiz Zayn al-Dīn ‘Abd al-Rahīm ibn al Ḥusayn (d. 806/1403).) and The Principles of Tradition. He also studied the Tawdīh, Isfahānī, Qādī-Mīr, al-Maqāsid (Object of Search) (Note: It is unclear if Celebi refers to a manual of astrology by Mīrim Chelebi Mahmūd ibn Muḥammad (d.1525) author, as several books share the title al-Maqāsid.), the Ādāb al-bahth (Rules of Disputation), Fanārī, the Tahdhīb and the Shamsiya.

He taught medicine, geography, geometry, the Sí fasl ('Thirty Sections') and the Bīst bāb ('Twenty Chapters') on the astrolabe, Elements of Accidence, al-Fanārī, the Shamsīya on logic, Jāmī, Mukhtasar, Farā’id, Multaqā, Durar, and Ali Qushji's treatises titled al-Muhammadiya on arithmetic and al-Fathīya on astronomy. (Note: He began a commentary on al-Muhammadiya which he never completed due to the deaths of his son and his pupil.) He wrote that his teaching method was “to enter every plurality by way of unity, and to master first principles by comprehending universals.” The astronomer Mevlana Mehmed ibn Ahmed Rumi al-Aqhisar was among those who attended his lectures.

His research ranged across lexicology, fiqh (jurisprudence), logic, rhetoric, tafsīr (Qur’ānic exegesis) and hadīth (Prophetic tradition), mathematics, medicine, mysteries of religion, astronomy, genealogy, history and chronicling.

Among his academic circle, he acquired the sobriquet “Kâtip Çelebi” (Learned Scribe). "Khatib" refers to a government clerk and "Chelebi" was used either for Ottoman princes or for scholars not part of the official hierarchy. His theology is described as Islamic orthodoxy combined with adherence to Ishrāqī (Illuminationist philosophy). The politician Köprülü Mehmed Paşa was a friend. It seems his tireless dedication to an arduous study regime, may have contributed to ill health and premature death in 1657 from a heart attack, aged just 49. On his death, Kâtip Çelebi left unfinished works. His only son died young and, in 1659, after his widow was deceased, his library was partly acquired by Levinus Warner for Leiden University (Legatum Warnerianum).

Çelebi’s taste for book acquisition had begun in Aleppo, and he would later expend a substantial part of his inheritance building his famous library, which came to be the largest in Istanbul in its day.

== Works ==
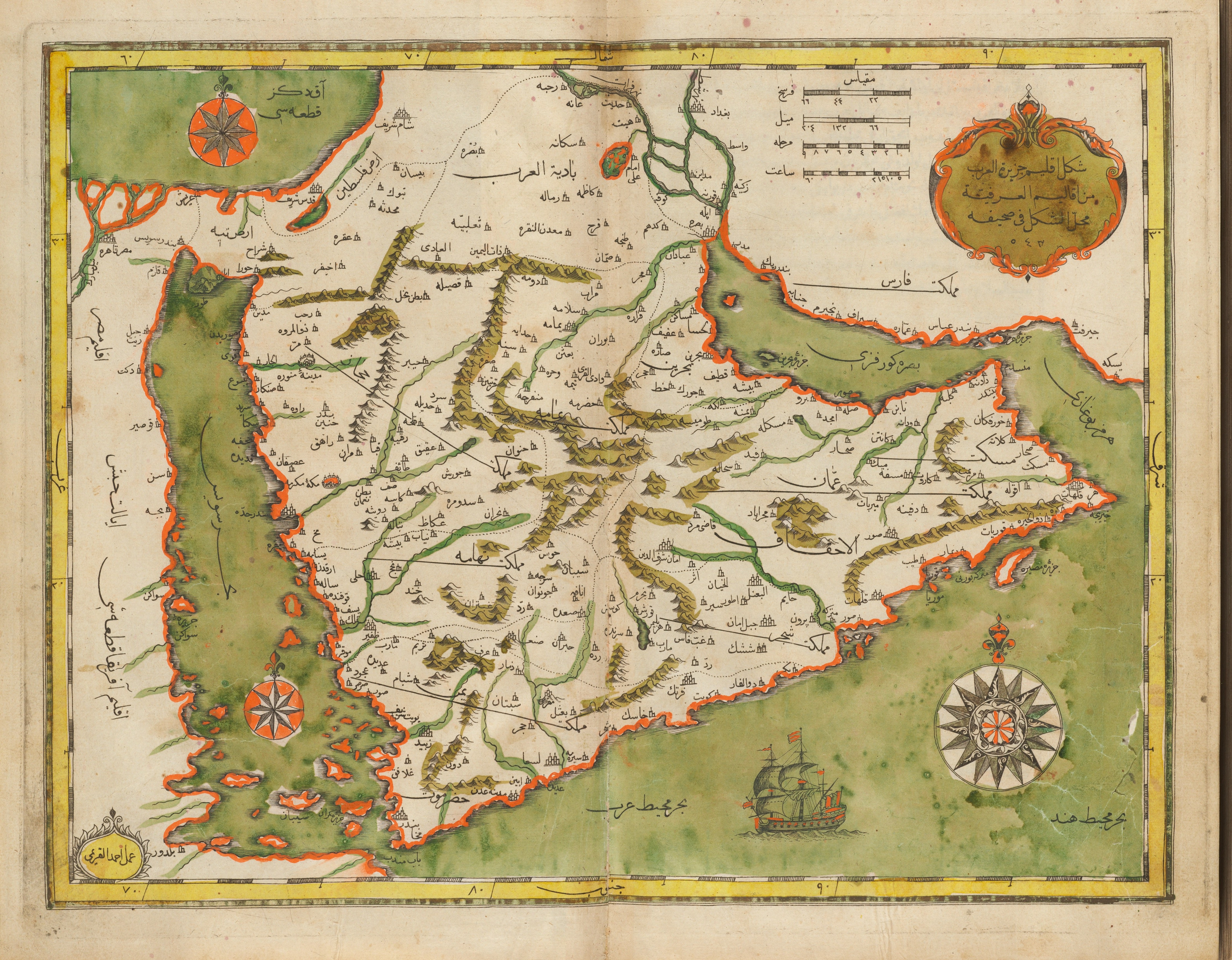
Map of Arabian Peninsula, Kitab-ı cihannüma [Istanbul, 1732] Typ 794.34.475 Houghton Library

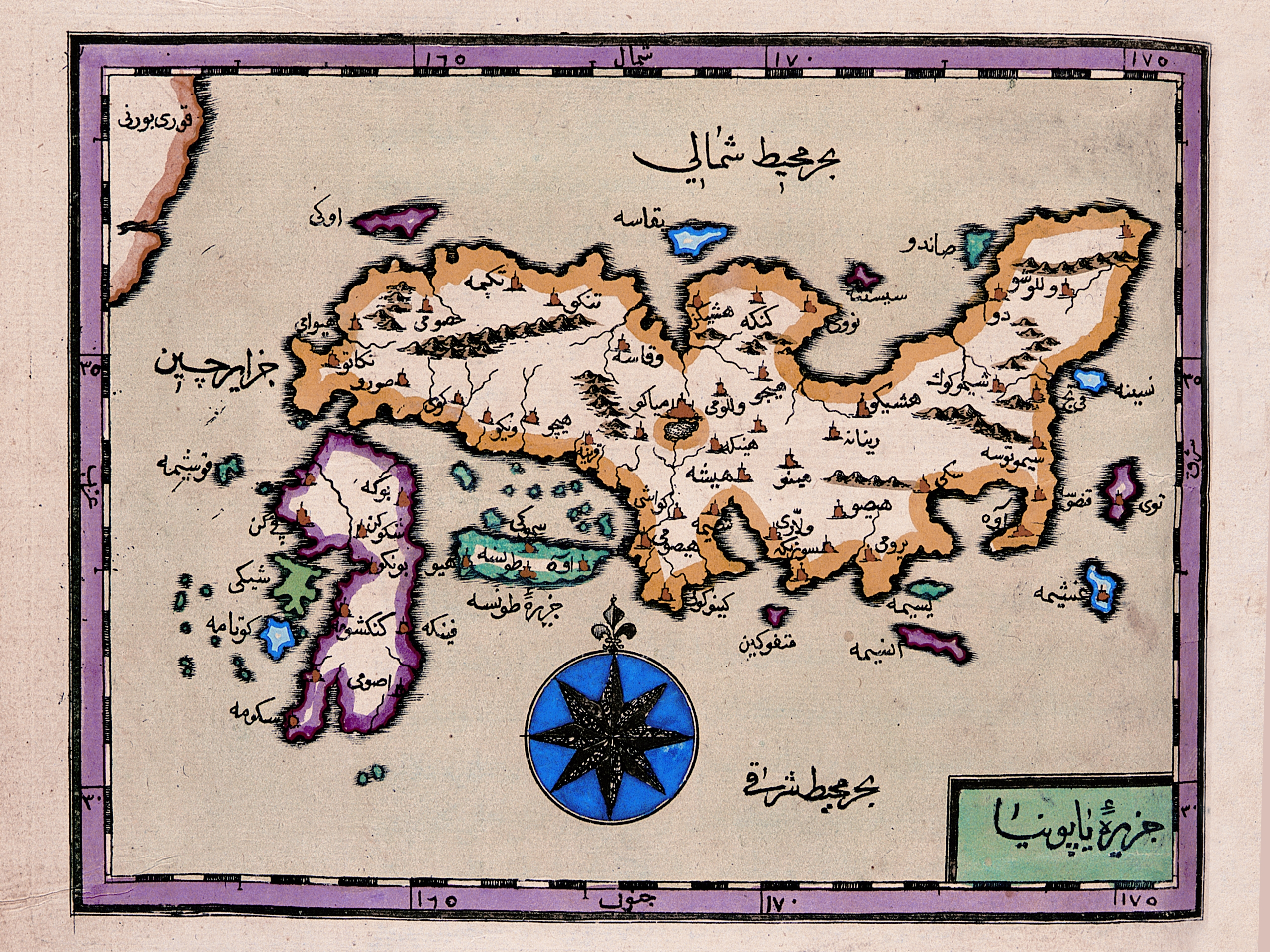
Map of Japan, Kitab-ı cihannüma [Istanbul, 1732] Cambridge University Library

Kâtip Çelebi was most productive in the decade up to his death in 1657. He authored at least 23 books, in addition to shorter essays and treatises:

- Fadhlakat al-Tawārīkh ('Compendium History') (1639); summary account of 150 dynasties. Fadhlakat; i) Arabic edition from Creation to c. 1639. Fezliké; ii) Turkish edition from 1000 AH to c. 1655. Index of 1,300 sources from original manuscript is lost.
- Taqwīm at-Tawārikh (تقويم التواريخ), ('Calendar of Histories' or ‘Chronological Tables’) (1648); Universal history from Creation of Adam until the year 1648. Written as an index to Fadhlaka partly in Turkish and partly in Persian. In 1697 Gio. Rinaldo Carli’s Italian translation was published titled Cronologia Historica.
- Cihânnümâ, (var., Djihān-numā, Jihannuma ) (جهان نما) (‘View of the World’); Two-part geographic dictionary begun in 1648: part I - seas, their configuration and islands; part II - countries, rivers, mountains, roads and lands newly discovered since the 15th century (i.e. America). Çelebi based the work on Lawāmi’ al-Nūr (‘Flashes of Light’) a translation by Mehmed Ikhlāsī’ (Note: Mehmed Efendi Ikhlāsī’ was a French priest convert to Islām, who introduced Çelebi to Western sources and assisted him with Latin translation for his book.) from the Latin work Atlas Minor by Gerardus Mercator (in the version published by Jodocus Hondius in Arnhem in 1621) ; the first use of European atlases and sources in Ottoman literature.
- Kashf aẓ-Ẓunūn ‘an 'asāmī ‘l-Kutub wa'l-funūn (كشف الظنون عن أسامي الكتب والفنون) (‘The Removal of Doubt from the Names of Books and the Arts’). Begun in Aleppo in 1042 AH/1632 CE and completed in about 1062 AH/1652 CE, it is a vast bibliographic-biographical dictionary in Arabic, and a research-tool for scholars. Its list, approx. 15,000 Arabic, Persian and Turkish titles, 9500 authors and 300 arts and sciences, comprises among the most extensive bibliographical dictionaries of Islamic literature. It was published as Lexicon Bibliographicum et Encyclopaedicum in Latin in 7 vols.
- Düstûr ül-Amel fî Islâh il-Halel / Dustūr al-amal li islāh al-khalal (دستور العمل) ('Code of Practice for the Rectification of Defects', or 'Instructions for the Reform of Abuses') (1653); This essay on the conduct of the State was published within a couple of years of Thomas Hobbes’s Leviathan, and contains some interesting parallels.
- Qānūnnāme-i tashrīfāt (‘Code of Ceremonies') (1653)
- Rajm al-rajīm bi’l-sīn wa’l-jīm (‘The Stoning of the Accursed with Sīn and Jīm’); a collection of fatwas (legal rulings).
- Mīzān al-ḥaqq fī iḫtiyār al-aḥaqq (Arabic: ميزان الحق في التصوف) (1656); ('Scales of Truth in the Choice of the Righteous One', or 'True Scales for the Detection of Truth'); “The Balance of Truth”; English translation and notes by Geoffrey L. Lewis (1957).
- Tarih-i Frengi - Translation of the Chronique de Jean Carrion (Paris, 1548)
- Rawnaq al-Sultāna – ('Splendour of the Sultanate'); translation of the Historia rerum in Oriente gestarum (Frankfurt, 1587). A history of Constantinople.
- Tuḥfat al-kibār fī asfār al-Bihār (تحفة الكبار في أسفار البحار) ('A Gift to the Great concerning Naval Expeditions') (1656) –The History of the Maritime Wars of the Turks (1831) English translation by James Mitchell.
- Sullam al-Wuṣūl ilā Ṭabaqāt al-Fuḥūl (سلم الوصول إلى طبقات الفحول) ('Ladder Leading to the Strata of the Eminent') (1651/2) Biographical dictionary of 8561 scholars, ancient and modern, to the letter Ṯāʾ, counterpart to Kashf al-Ẓunūn. Critical edition 2009. (Note: 2009 was the 400th anniversary of the author’s birth and in celebration UNESCO named 2009 Kātip Çelebi Year, and the I.R.C.I.C.A. (Research Centre for Islamic History, Art and Culture) recognised his significance to the culture heritage of the Ottoman era with the first publication of his great biographical dictionary Sullam Al-Wuṣūl from the Arabic original manuscript.)
- Tuḥfat al-Akhyār fī’l-Hukam wa-l’Amthāl wa-l’Asha’ār (تحفة الأخيار في الحكم والأمثال والأشعار) (‘The Precious Gift of the Elect, on Maxims, Proverbs, and Poems’) (1653); completed to the letter Jīm.
- Rumeli und Bosna, geographical treatise (tr. German)

== Legacy ==
İzmir Kâtip Çelebi University in İzmir is named after him.

The Newton-Katip Çelebi Fund operates an exchange program for science and innovation between Turkey and the UK.

== See also ==
- Evliya Çelebi
- Surat Al-Ard

== Bibliography ==
- Herbelot de Molainville, Barthélemy d' (1777). Bibliothèque Orientale; from Ḣājī Khalfah, Kashf al-zunūn) (in French). Vol. 3. La Haye, J. Neaulme & N. van Daalen.
- Bernath, Mathias; von Schroeder, Felix (1979). Biographisches Lexikon zur Geschichte Südosteuropas. Oldenbourg Verlag. p. 270. ISBN 978-3-486-48991-0. "Mustafa bin 'Abdullah (= Mustafa Sohn des Abdullah, gewöhnlich Katib oder Haci Halife genannt)"
- Chalabi, Katib (2010). Ihsanoğlu, Ekmeleddin (ed.). Sullam al-Wuṣūl (with introduction in English) (in Arabic).
- Don Babai, ed. (2004). "Reflections on the past, visions for the future". Historians of the Ottoman Empire. Harvard University, Center for Middle Eastern Studies. pp. 97–99. ISBN 978-0-9762727-0-0.
- Encyclopædia of Islam (Leiden, 1954) vol. 4, s.v. Ḥād̲j̲d̲j̲ī K̲h̲alīfai.
- Hadschi Chalfa, Mustafa Ben Abdalla (1812). Rumeli und Bosna, geographische (in German). Translated by von Hammer, Joseph. Wien.
- Hagen, Gottfried (2003). Ein osmanischer Geograph bei der Arbeit: Entstehung und Gedankenwelt von Katib Celebis Ğihannüma. Berlin: Klaus-Schwarz-Verlag. ISBN 3-87997-303-2.
- Hagen, Gottfried (March 2007). Cornell Fleischer (ed.). "Kātib Çelebī. In: Cemal Kafadar, Hakan Karateke". Historians of the Ottoman Empire.
- Halife', Hazi (1697). Cronologia Historica (in Italian). Translated by Carli, Gio. Rinaldo.
- Katib Jelebi, Mustafa Ben Abdallah (1835). Gustav Flügel (ed.). Lexicon Bibliographicum et Encyclopaedicum (Kashf az-Zunun) (in Arabic and Latin). Vol. 1. Translated by Gustav Flügel. Leipzig: The Oriental Translation Fund of Gt. Brit. & Ireland., (Vol.,2; Leipzig, 1837), (Vol.,3; London, 1842), (Vol.,4; London, 1845), (Vol.,5; London, 1850), (Vol.,6; London, 1852).
- Klaus Kreiser (2008). Der osmanische Staat 1300-1922 (in German). Oldenbourg. p. 101f. ISBN 978-3-486-58588-9.
- Kreiser/Neumann (2003). Kleine Geschichte der Türkei (in German). Reclam. pp. 190, 208, 235f, 239f. ISBN 3-15-010540-4.
- Kreutel, Liex Richard Franz (1979). Mustafa bin 'Abdullah, in: Biographisches Lexikon zur Geschichte Südosteuropas (in German). Vol. 3. München. p. 270 f.
- Lewis, G.L. (1957). The Balance of Truth (translated from Mīzān al-ḥaqq of Katib Chelebi with an introduction and notes). London.
- Mitchell, James (1831). The History of the Maritime Wars of the Turks (translated from "Tuḥfat al-kibār" of Haji Khalifeh). London: Oriental Translation Fund.
- Piterberg, Gabriel (2003). An Ottoman Tragedy: History and Historiography at Play. California: University of California Press. pp. 46–47. ISBN 978-0520930056.
- Shefer-Mossensohn, Miri (2015). Science Among the Ottomans: The Cultural Creation and Exchange of Knowledge. Texas: University of Texas Press. pp. 64–66. ISBN 978-1477303597.
- Taeschner, Franz (1982). Die osmanische Literatur in Handbuch der Orientalistik: Turkologie (in German). Brill publishers. p. 316f. ISBN 90-04-06555-5.
- Zemmin, Florian (2011). "Islamische Verantwortungsethik im 17. Jahrhundert. Ein weberianisches Verständnis der Handlungsvorstellungen Kātib Čelebis (1609-1657)". Bonner Islamstudien (in German) (26). Berlin: ebv-Verlag. ISBN 978-3-86893-065-8.

Attribution
