= Kitāb al-Ḥashāʾish =

Medieval Arabic pharmacological and botanical book

- Author: Based on De Materia Medica by Pedanius Dioscorides
- Original title: كتاب الحشائش
- Translator: Istifan ibn Basil (trad.); Ḥunayn ibn Isḥaq (rev.)
- Language: Arabic
- Subject: Materia medica; Pharmacology; Botany
- Genre: Scientific treatise
- Publication date: 9th century
- Publication place: Abbasid Caliphate
- Media type: Manuscript

Kitāb al-Ḥashāʾish (Arabic: كتاب الحشائش, Book of Medicinal Plants) is a medieval Arabic pharmacological and botanical book that deals with medicinal plants, minerals, and animal-derived substances. The work forms part of the Islamic scientific tradition of materia medica and reflects the transmission, translation, and expansion of Greco-Roman medical knowledge in the medieval Islamic world. It is based on De materia medica which was written by Pedanius Dioscorides, a Greek physician in the Roman army. It was widely read for more than 1,500 years until supplanted by revised herbals in the Renaissance, making it one of the longest-lasting of all natural history and pharmacology books.

The manuscript copy of Kitāb al-Ḥashāʾish are preserved in the Khuda Bakhsh Oriental Library.
