= Miri Shefer-Mossensohn =

Professor of Middle Eastern history at Tel Aviv University

Miri Shefer-Mossensohn (Hebrew: מירי שפר-מוסנשון) is professor of Middle Eastern history at Tel Aviv University, and the former Head of the university's Zvi Yavetz School of Historical Studies. She specializes in Ottoman & Turkish Studies, with a focus on the history of medicine, cultural history and environmental history..

In 2020, Shefer-Mossensohn's online learning course titled "Arab-Islamic History: From Tribes to Empires”, garnered over 20,000 students from 155 countries, including from "Pakistan, Indonesia, Qatar and Afghanistan". It was ranked among top 50 online courses according to one poll.

Shefer-Mossensohn is a regular news commentator on Turkey and Middle Eastern affairs in the Israeli press, including in staple news outlets like Ynet and Haaretz.

== Selected works ==
- Miri Shefer-Mossensohn, Science among the Ottomans: The cultural creation and exchange of knowledge (University of Texas Press, Austin, 2015).
- Shefer-Mossensohn, Miri, and Keren Abou Hershkovitz. "Early Muslim Medicine and the Indian Context: A Reinterpretation." Medieval Encounters 19.3 (2013): 274–299.
- Shefer-Mossensohn, Miri. "A Sick Sultana in the Ottoman Imperial Palace: Male Doctors, Female Healers and Female Patients in the Early Modern Period1." Hawwa 9.3 (2011): 281–312.
- Miri Shefer-Mossensohn, Ottoman Medicine: Healing and Medical Institutions: 1500-1700 (SUNY Press, Albany, 2009).
- Mossensohn, Miri Shefer. "Health as a social agent in Ottoman patronage and authority." New Perspectives on Turkey 37 (2007): 147–175.
