= Kashf al-Zunun =

1650s encyclopedia of books and sciences

Kashf al-Zunun 'an Asami al-Kutub wa al-Funun
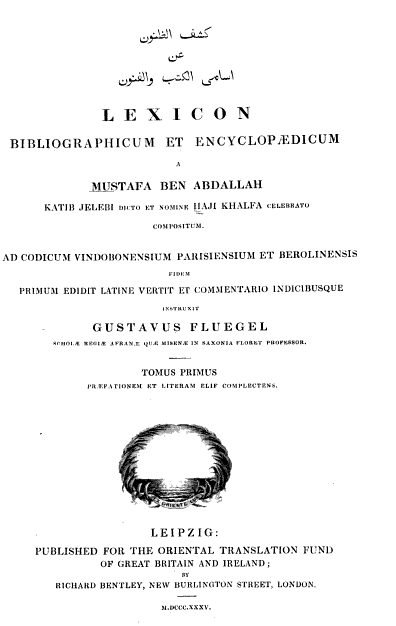
- Author: Kâtip Çelebi
- Original title: كشف الظنون عن أسامي الكتب والفنون
- Language: Arabic, Latin, French
- Genre: Bibliographic-encyclopedia
- OCLC: 469358915

Kashf al-Zunun 'an Asami al-Kutub wa al-Funun (The Removal of Doubt from the Names of Books and the Arts) is a bibliographic encyclopedia of books and sciences compiled by Turkish polymath Kâtip Çelebi. It was written in Arabic and was based on the Miftāḥ al-Saʿāda wa-miṣbāḥ al-Siyādah (Note: Miftāḥ al-Saʿāda wa-miṣbāḥ al-Siyādah (مفتاح السعادة ومصباح السيادة في موضوعات العلوم} loosely translates: 'The Key to Happiness and the Lamp of Lordship'.) by the c.16th Ottoman historian, Taşköprüzade. However the Kaşf substantially enlarges it, cataloging titles of approximately 15,000 books; 9,500 names of authors; and 300 sciences and arts. The work is seen as a significant example of and contribution to Ottoman historiography.

At the age of twenty-five in 1633, while in Aleppo, Celebi began compiling and composing the work; it occupied him for the next twenty years until its completion in 1652. An account of this is contained in another of his widely read books, "Mizan al-Haq," where he writes:

"On my stay in Aleppo, I would visit bookshops to browse, and then when I had returned to Istanbul and came into some money, I began acquiring books and letters. In 1638, a relative died and left me a more substantial legacy, which was spent in large part collecting the great works which I had seen in Aleppo, Istanbul and in the public repositories of the Sultanate of Oman". (Note: Catalogue reprinted in Bulaq copy of printed edition of the Turkish Information Agency in (1941-1943), published in several volumes and editions.)

Celebi died suddenly in 1657, leaving many works in unfinished or draft form.

== Contents ==
- Vol.1. Preface & Letter alif
- Vol.2. Letters bá-jím
- Vol.3. Letters há-sín
- Vol.4. Letters shín-cáf
- Vol.5. Letters káf-mím ( -moghíth)
- Vol.6. Letters mím (mofátehat- )-yá
- Vol.7. Library catalogues of Cairo, Damascus, Aleppo, Rhodes and Istanbul.

== Editions ==
- Muhammad Azti Effendi Boshnah Zadeh (d. 1681).
- Ibrahīm al-Rūmi al-Arabji (d. 1775) mentioned by Khalil al-Muradi in his biographic dictionary Silk al-Durar (Arabic).
- Ahmed Hanífzádeh, Mollae El-Hájj Ibrahím Haníf Efendi, ed., (حنيف زاده) (d.1802) titled (Athārnū) (اثارنو). Contains 5000 books. Appended by Flügel in Vol.VI, Leipzig edition (1835–1858) with Latin translation and a volume for Oriental libraries. (Note: Aḥmad Ḥanīf-Zādah. (اثارنو) Nova Opera ab Ahmed Hanifzádeh ad continuandum Haji Khalfae Lexicon Bibliographicum collecta et ad ordinem literarum disposita… Edidit G. Fluegel. [With a Latin translation.] 1852 – London.- Oriental Translation Fund of Great Britain and Ireland. Muṣṭafā ibn Allāh, called Kātib Chelebī or Ḥajī Khalfah. Lexicon Bibliographicum, etc. tom. 6. 1835 etc. 4o. 14003.g.3. and 15000.e.1.) (Note: Catalogue of Arabic books in the British Museum by British Museum. Dept. of Oriental Printed Books and Manuscripts; W.W. Elliott & Co; Fulton, A. S. (Alexander Strathern) 1894. Catalogue of Arabic books in the British Museum, p.208)
- Sheikh Islam Aref Hikmat, ed., (d.1858) up to the letter jím (c). (See Al-Arab Al-Arab 2: 897).
- Ishmael Pasha al-Baghdadi, ed., (d.1921), titled The Explanation of the Makenun. Contains 19000 books and was followed by translations of the authors (1941).
- Ismail Saeb Singer, ed.
- Jamil al-‘Uẓmā (جميل العظم) ('The Great Beauty') (1933), titled al-Sirr al-Maṣūn (السر المصون -خ) ('Well-kept Secret' - kh) with introduction (1000 page) titled Book of Science and Travel (الإسفار عن العلوم والأسفار).
- Mohammed Al-Sadiq Al-Nefir (1938), titled Salwa Al-Mahzun.
- Muhammad bin Mustafa al-Bakri ed., (d. 1782), Khulāsat Tahqíq az-Zunūn (خلاصة تحقيق الظنون)('Investigation of Suspicions, abridged'); Index to al-Kashf and amendments.
- Ali Khairi, ed., (d.1909) Ḍiyā’ al-‘Aiūn (ضياء العيون) (Illumination of the Eminent); a footnote to al-Kashf.
- Sources of Andalusian heritage: the publications of the Cultural Center in Abu Dhabi, pitfalls of correcting Haji Khalifa in dealing with the heritage of Andalusia.
- Abridgement and supplement; Hussein Abbasi Nabhani Halabi, ed., (d.1684), titled ('The Complete Memorial of Antiquities').

== Translations ==
- Lexicon Bibliographicum et Encyclopaedicum,(1835-58) Arabic-Latin by Gustav Leberecht Flügel
- Bibliothèque Orientale, (1697) French by Barthélemy d'Herbelot and Antoine Galland, with contributions from Johann Jacob Reiske and Henry Albert Schultens.

== Bibliography ==
- Kashf Aa Zunun. Bayrūt: Dār al-Kutub al-ʻIlmīyah. 2008. ISBN 978-2745155009.
- Hājī Khalfah (1892). Kashf al-ẓunūn. Vol. 2. Dersa'ādet Ḥasan Ḥilmī el-kütübī.
- Haji Khalfah (2010). Kashf al-ẓunūn. Bayrūt: Nabu Press.
- Haji Khalfah. Lexicon Bibliographicum et Encyclopaedicum. Translated by Gustav Flugel. Oriental translation fund of Great Britain & Ireland.
- Haji Khalfah (1777). Bibliothèque orientale, ou dictionnaire universel contenant tout ce qui regarde la connoissance des peuples de l'Orient (in French). Translated by Barthélemy d'Herbelot. La Haye, J. Neaulme & N. van Daalen.
- Katib Jelebi, Mustafa Ben Abdallah (1835). Gustav Flügel (ed.). Lexicon Bibliographicum et Encyclopaedicum (Kashf az-Zunun) (in Arabic and Latin). Vol. 1. Translated by Gustav Flügel. Leipzig: The Oriental Translation Fund of Gt. Brit. & Ireland., (Vol.,2; Leipzig, 1837), (Vol.,3; London, 1842), (Vol.,4; London, 1845), (Vol.,5; London, 1850), (Vol.,6; London, 1852).
- d'Herbelot, Barthélemy (1777). Bibliotheque orientale (in French). La Haye: J. Neaulme & N. van Daalen., v.1 (A-E), v.2 (F-M), v.3 (N-Z)
