= Barthélemy d'Herbelot =

French orientalist (1625–1695)

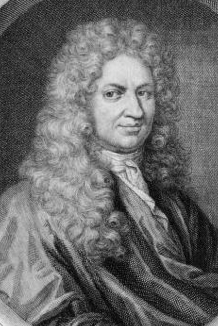
Portrait of d'Herbelot by Gérard Edelinck

Barthélemy d'Herbelot de Molainville (English: /dɛrbəˈloʊ/ der-buh-LOH, French: [baʁtɛlemi dɛʁbəlo]; 14 December 1625 – 8 December 1695) was a French Orientalist.

== Bibliography ==
Born in Paris, he was educated at the University of Paris, and devoted himself to the study of oriental languages, going to Italy to perfect himself in them by converse with the orientals who frequented its seaports. There he also made the acquaintance of Holstenius, the Dutch humanist (1596–1661), and Leo Allatius, the Greek scholar (1586–1669). On his return to France after a year and a half, he was received into the house of Fouquet, superintendent of finance, who gave him a pension of 1500 livres. Losing this on the disgrace of Fouquet in 1661, he was appointed secretary and interpreter of Eastern languages to the king.

A few years later he again visited Italy, when the grand-duke Ferdinand II of Tuscany presented him with a large number of valuable Oriental manuscripts, and tried to attach him to his court. Herbelot, however, was recalled to France by Colbert, and received from the king a pension equal to the one he had lost. In 1692 he succeeded Jacques d'Auvergne in the chair of Syriac, at the Collège Royal. He died in Paris on 8 December 1695.

His great work is the Bibliothèque orientale, ou dictionnaire universel contenant tout ce qui regarde la connoissance des peuples de l'Orient, which occupied him nearly all his life, and was completed in 1697 by Antoine Galland. It is based on the immense Arabic bibliography (the Kashf al-Zunun) of Hadji Khalfa (Katip Çelebi), of which indeed it is largely an abridged translation, but it also contains the substance of a vast number of other Arabic and Turkish compilations and manuscripts. The Bibliothèque was reprinted at Maastricht (fol. 1776), and at The Hague (4 vols quarto, 1777–1799). A popularising version was also issued in 6 vols octavo (Paris, 1781–83). Of the four editions, the "best" edition is the 4 vol quarto edition of The Hague. That edition is enriched with the contributions of the Dutch orientalist Schultens, Johann Jakob Reiske (1716–1774), and by a supplement provided by Visdelou and Antoine Galland. Herbelot's other works, none of which have been published, comprise an Oriental Anthology, and an Arabic, Persian, Turkish and Latin Dictionary.

== See also ==
- Sufi studies
- François Pétis de la Croix
