= Paolo Morigia =

Italian historian

Reverend Paolo Morigia
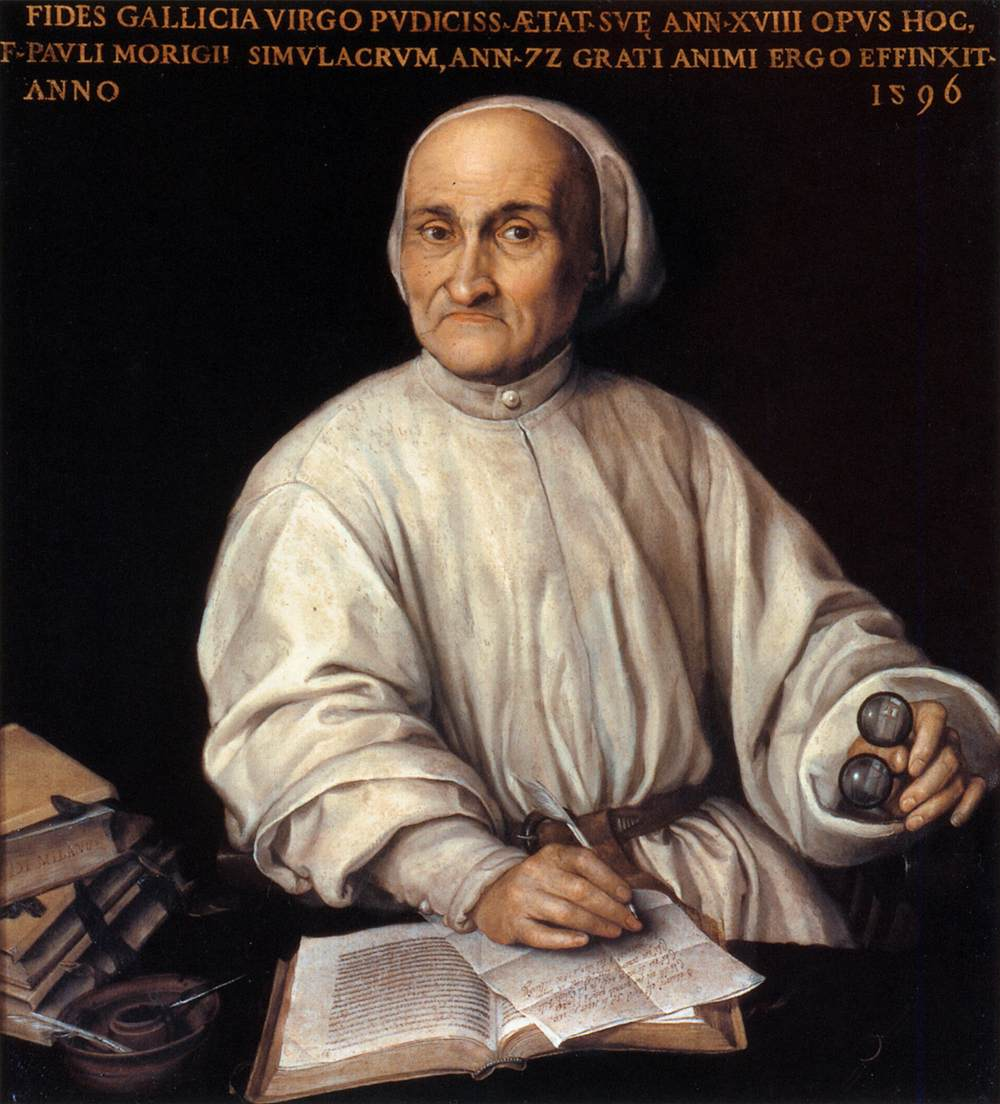
- Fede Galizia, Portrait of Paolo Morigia, oil on canvas, 88 x 79 cm, Pinacoteca Ambrosiana, Milan, 1596
- Born: January 1, 1525; Milan, Duchy of Milan
- Died: 1604 (aged 79); Milan, Duchy of Milan
- Resting place: Convent of San Girolamo, Milan
- Occupations: Catholic priest; historian
- Title: prior
- Parent(s): Damiano Morigia and Angela Morigia (née Migliavacca)

Academic work
- Discipline: History
- Sub-discipline: History of Milan, Church history

Paolo Morigia (1 January 1525 – 1604) was an Italian scholar and a Jesuate. His prolific writings focus on the history of his native city on the one hand, and of the Catholic Church, its saints and its religious practices on the other.

== Biography ==
Paolo Morigia was born in Milan in 1525 to a wealthy and noble family. At the age of seventeen he entered the order of the Jesuati, founded by Giovanni Colombini of Siena in 1360.

A prolific author, he is best remembered for his works on the history of Milan. A meticulous historian, Morigia "diligently searched through public and private archives for 'contracts, privileges, epitaphs, and other authentic [i.e., nonnarrative] writings,' from which he quoted abundantly. And he read carefully through all of the ancient and modern historians who had ever said anything about Milan."

Morigia wrote also a popular devotional work called the Giardino spirituale which included prayers, daily meditations, preparations for confession and communion, and a discourse on dying well.

He died in Milan in 1604 and was buried in the church of the convent of San Girolamo, belonging to the order.

Morigia was on friendly terms with several important personalities of his time, including Gabriele Paleotti, Giulio Sfondrati and Charles Borromeo. He was one of Fede Galizia's earliest patrons, and in his La Nobiltà di Milano (The Nobility of Milan), a collection of short biographies of Milanese writers and artists published in 1595, he wrote that she showed signs of "becoming a truly noble painter." Galizia also made a portrait of Morigia.

== Works ==
- Istoria et Origine della famosa Fontana della Madonna di Caravaggio. Milan: presso il Colonna. 1545.
- Istoria dell'Origine di tutte le Religioni. Venice: appresso Pietro da Fino. 1569.
- Paradiso de' Gesuati, nel quale si racconta l'origine dell'ordine de' Gesuati di S. Girolamo e le vite del B. Giovanni Colombini, fondatore di esso ordine, e d'alcuni de' suoi discepoli. Venice: presso Domenico e Giovanni Battista Guerra. 1582.
- Istoria dell'Antichità di Milano. Venice: appresso i Guerra. 1592.
- Historia brieue dell'augustissima casa d'Austria. Bergamo: per Comin Ventura. 1593.
- Historia de' personaggi illustri religiosi, divisa in cinque libri. Bergamo: per Comin Ventura. 1594.
- Della nobiltà de i Signori XL del consiglio di Milano, libri VI. Milan: per Francesco Paganello. 1595. Chapters XVI to XIX, are an important source for the history of Late Renaissance art.
- Il Duomo di Milano descritto. Milan: per Francesco Paganello. 1597.
- Tesoro precioso de' milanesi, nel quale si raccontano tutte le opere di carita christiana che si fanno in Milano, ospedali, case pie, scuole, letture, etc. Milan: per Gratiadio Ferioli. 1599.
- Istoria della nobiltà del Lago Maggiore, nella quale si descrive il fiume Ticino, con la descrizione di tutte le terre e borghi che giacciono nelle sue riviere, con gli uomini degni di lode che sono usciti da quei luoghi. Milan: per Hieronimo Bordone, & Pietro Martire Locarni compagni. 1603.

== Bibliography ==
- Picinelli, Filippo (1670). Ateneo dei letterati milanesi. Milan: Vigone. pp. 452–3.
- Cusani, Francesco (1877). "Paolo Moriggia e Giuseppe Ripamonti storici milanesi". Archivio Storico Lombardo. 4: 43–69.
- Gagliardi, Isabella (2012). "MORIGIA, Paolo". Dizionario Biografico degli Italiani (in Italian). Vol. 76: Montauti–Morlaiter. Rome: Istituto dell'Enciclopedia Italiana. ISBN 978-88-12-00032-6.
- Gagliardi, Isabella (2005). "La Historia dell'origine di tutte le religioni di Paolo Morigia tra memoria e censura". Nunc alia tempora, alii mores: storici e storia in età postridentina. Florence: Leo S. Olschki. pp. 93–110. doi:10.1400/187877.
