= André Tacquet =

Brabantian mathematician and priest (1612–1660)

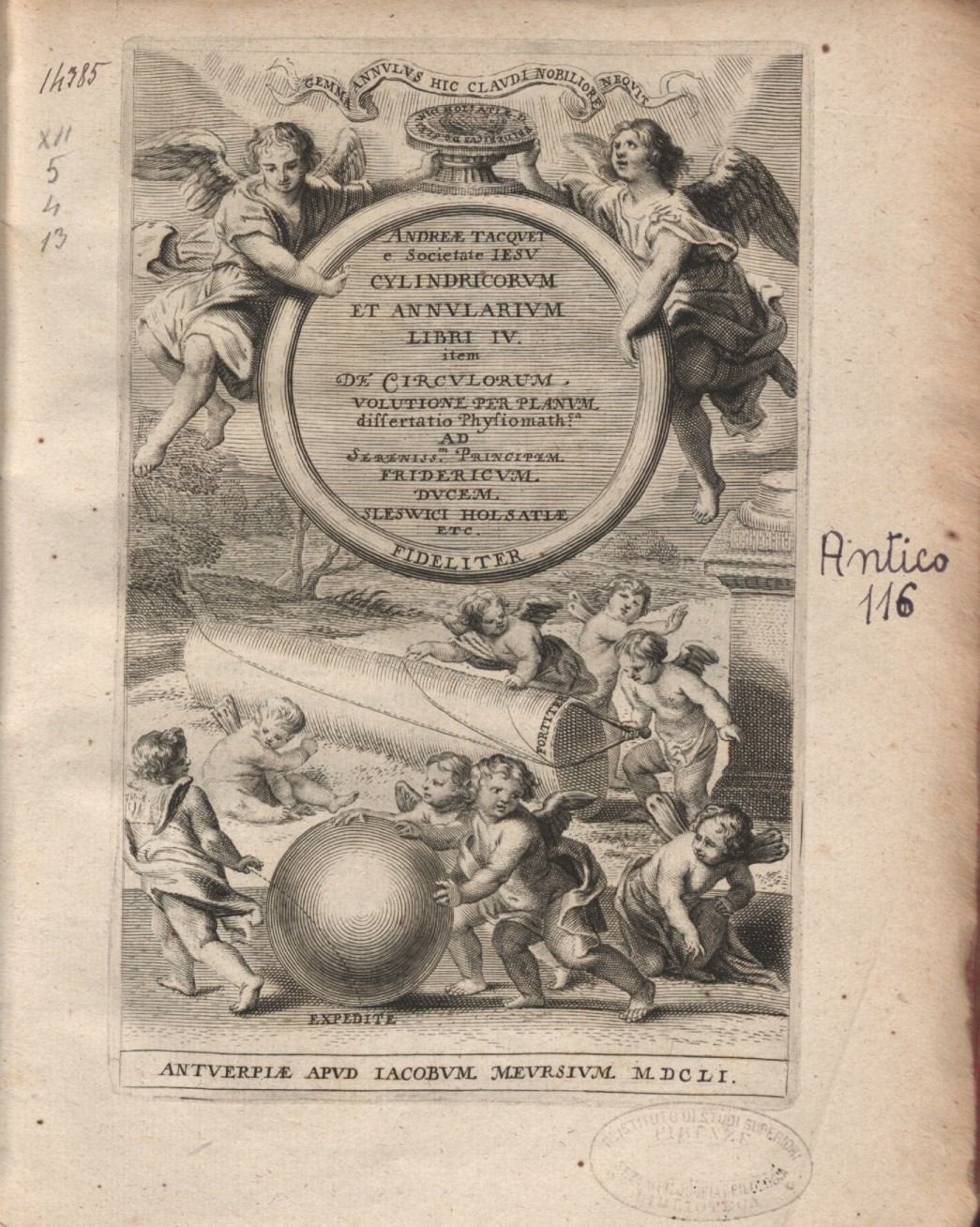
Cylindricorum et annularium libri, 1651

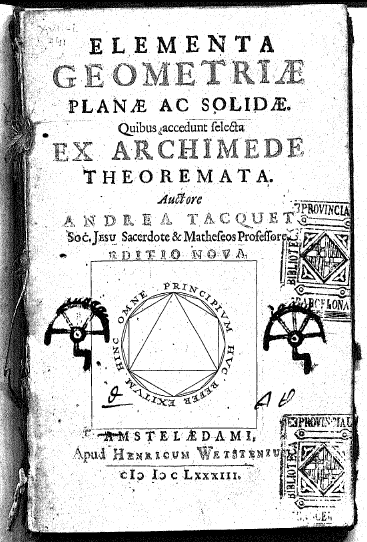
Title page of his Elementa Geometriae...'

André Tacquet (French pronunciation: [ɑ̃dʁe takɛ]; 23 June 1612 Antwerp – 22 December 1660 Antwerp, also referred to by his Latinized name Andrea Tacquet) was a Brabantian mathematician and Jesuit priest. Tacquet adhered to the methods of the geometry of Euclid and the philosophy of Aristotle and opposed the method of indivisibles.

== Life ==
André Tacquet was born in Antwerp, and entered the Jesuit Order in 1629. From 1631 to 1635, he studied mathematics, physics and logic at Leuven. Two of his teachers were Grégoire de Saint-Vincent and Francois d'Aguilon.

Tacquet became a brilliant mathematician of international fame and his works were often reprinted and translated (into Italian and English). His most famous work, which influenced the thinking of Blaise Pascal and his contemporaries, is Cylindricorum et annularium (1651). In this book Tacquet presented how a moving point could generate a curve and the theories of area and volume.

He died in Antwerp.

In honor of André Tacquet, his name has been given to a small crater in the northeast part of the Moon, near the southern edge of Mare Serenitatis.

== Opposition to the method of indivisibles ==
Tacquet claimed in his 1651 book Cylindricorum et annularium libri IV that

[the method of indivisibles] makes war upon geometry to such an extent, that if it is not to destroy it, it must itself be destroyed.

The Jesuat Stefano degli Angeli provided a detailed response, defending Cavalieri's method.

== Works ==
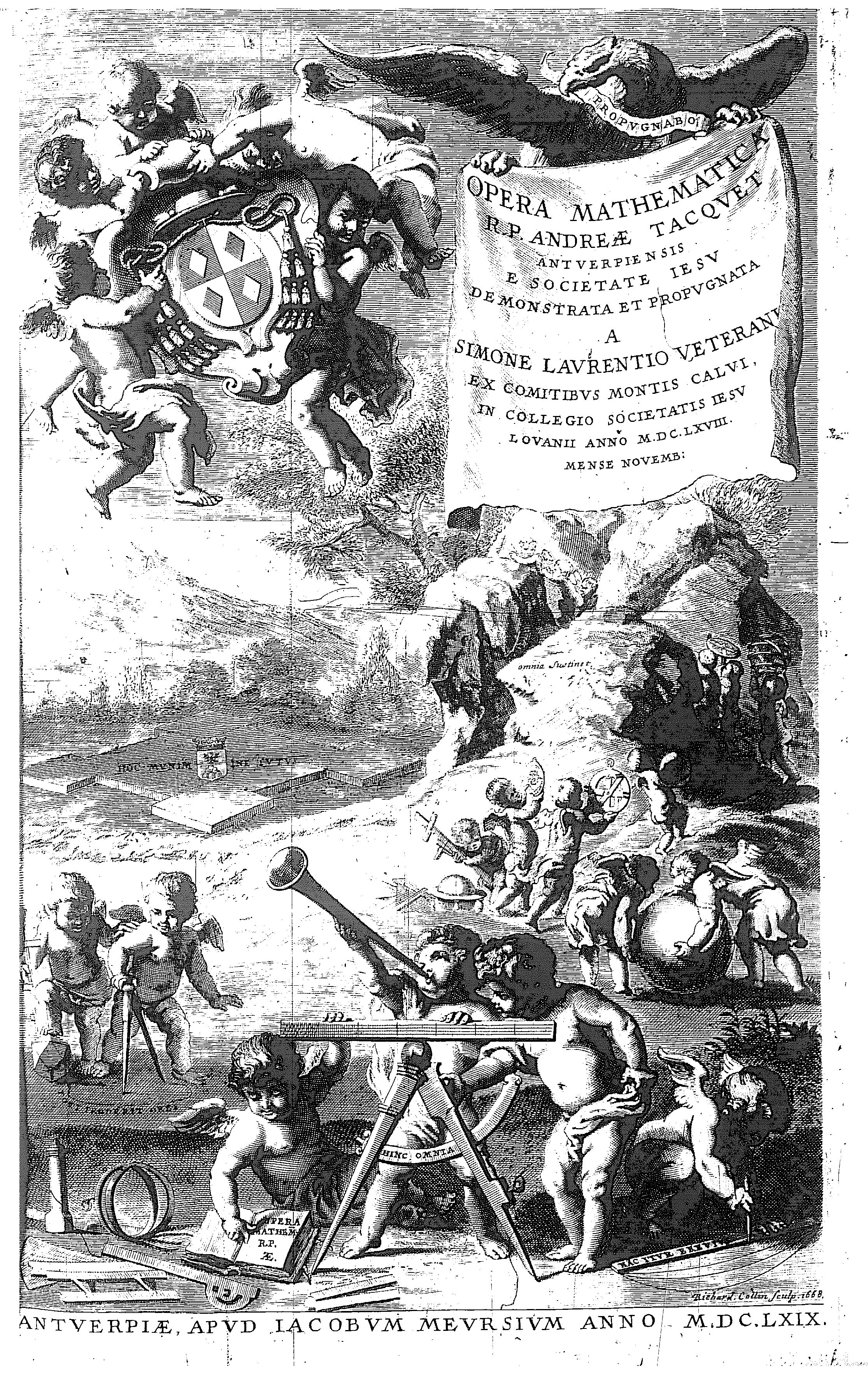
Opera mathematica, 1669

- 1651: Cylindricorum et annularium libri IV (Antwerp) full text
- 1654: Elementa geometriae (Antwerp)
- 1656: Arithmeticae theoria et praxis (Louvain)
- 1659: Cylindricorum et annularium liber V (Antwerp) full text
- 1669: Opera mathematica (in Latin). Antwerpen: Jacob van Meurs.
- 1725: Elementa Euclideae, geometriae (Amsterdam) full text

== See also ==
- List of Jesuit scientists
- List of Roman Catholic scientist-clerics
