= Abscissa and ordinate =

Horizontal and vertical axes/coordinate numbers of a 2D coordinate system or graph

Cartesian plane with marked points (signed ordered pairs of coordinates). For any point, the abscissa is the first value (x coordinate), and the ordinate is the second value (y coordinate).

In mathematics, the abscissa (/æbˈsɪs.ə/; plural abscissae or abscissas) and the ordinate are respectively the first and second coordinate of a point in a Cartesian coordinate system:

abscissa $\equiv x$-axis (horizontal) coordinate
ordinate $\equiv y$-axis (vertical) coordinate

Together they form an ordered pair which defines the location of a point in two-dimensional rectangular space.

More technically, the abscissa of a point is the signed measure of its projection on the primary axis. Its absolute value is the distance between the projection and the origin of the axis, and its sign is given by the location on the projection relative to the origin (before: negative; after: positive). Similarly, the ordinate of a point is the signed measure of its projection on the secondary axis. In three dimensions, the third direction is sometimes referred to as the applicate.

== Etymology ==
Though the word "abscissa" (from Latin linea abscissa 'a line cut off') has been used at least since De Practica Geometrie (1220) by Fibonacci (Leonardo of Pisa), its use in its modern sense may be due to Venetian mathematician Stefano degli Angeli in his work Miscellaneum Hyperbolicum, et Parabolicum (1659). Historically, the term was used in the more general sense of a 'distance'.

In his 1892 work Vorlesungen über die Geschichte der Mathematik ("Lectures on history of mathematics"), volume 2, German historian of mathematics Moritz Cantor writes:

Gleichwohl ist durch [Stefano degli Angeli] vermuthlich ein Wort in den mathematischen Sprachschatz eingeführt worden, welches gerade in der analytischen Geometrie sich als zukunftsreich bewährt hat. […] Wir kennen keine ältere Benutzung des Wortes Abscisse in lateinischen Originalschriften. Vielleicht kommt das Wort in Uebersetzungen der Apollonischen Kegelschnitte vor, wo Buch I Satz 20 von ἀποτεμνομέναις die Rede ist, wofür es kaum ein entsprechenderes lateinisches Wort als abscissa geben möchte.

At the same time it was presumably by [Stefano degli Angeli] that a word was introduced into the mathematical vocabulary for which especially in analytic geometry the future proved to have much in store. […] We know of no earlier use of the word abscissa in Latin original texts. Maybe the word appears in translations of the Apollonian conics, where [in] Book I, Chapter 20 there is mention of ἀποτεμνομέναις, for which there would hardly be a more appropriate Latin word than abscissa.

The use of the word ordinate is related to the Latin phrase linea ordinata appliicata 'line applied parallel'.

== In parametric equations ==
In a somewhat obsolete variant usage, the abscissa of a point may also refer to any number that describes the point's location along some path, e.g. the parameter of a parametric equation. Used in this way, the abscissa can be thought of as a coordinate-geometry analog to the independent variable in a mathematical model or experiment (with any ordinates filling a role analogous to dependent variables).

== See also ==
- Function (mathematics)
- Relation (mathematics)
- Line chart
