= Fede Galizia =

Italian artist (c. 1578–c. 1630)

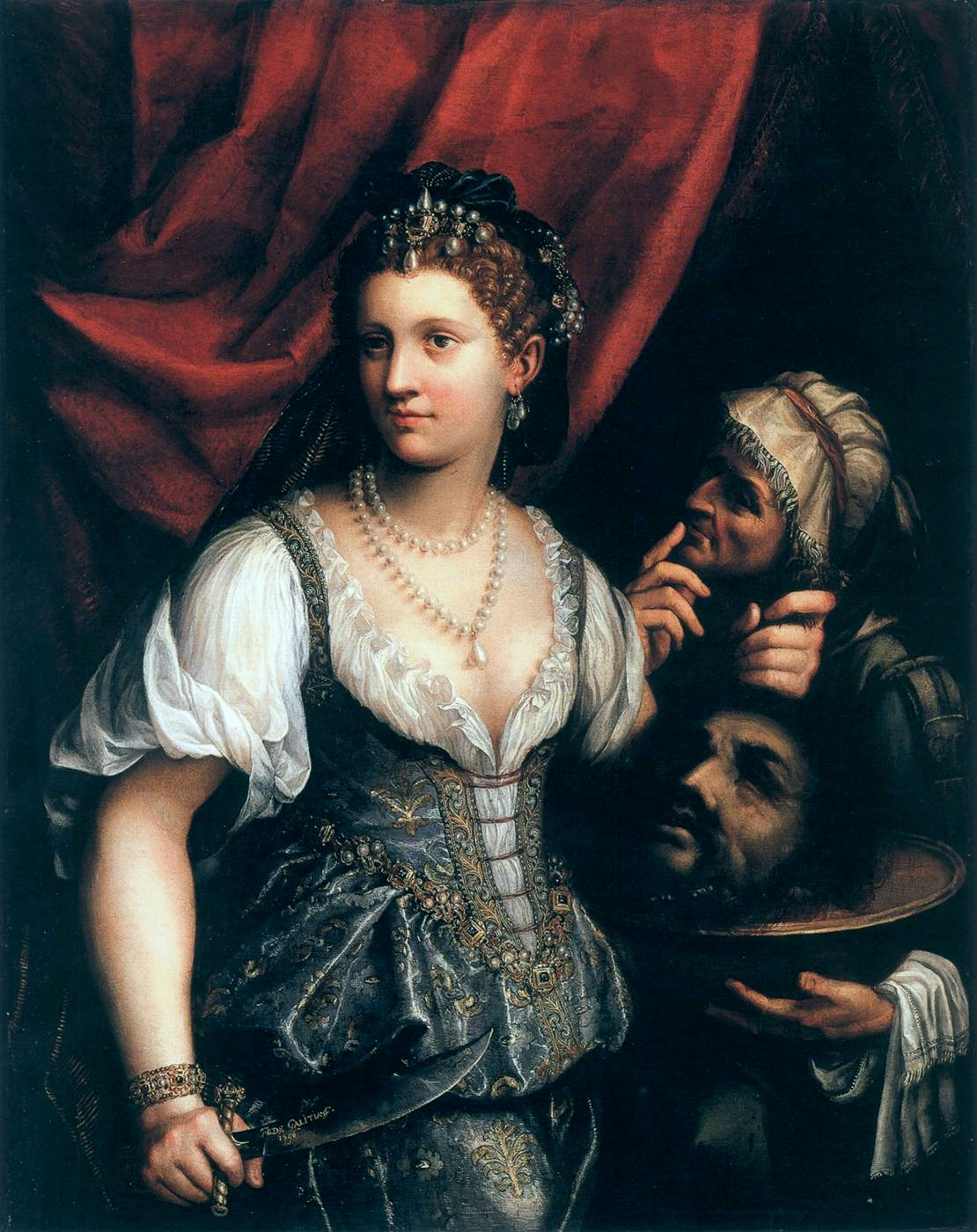
- Judith with the Head of Holofernes (1596). The figure of Judith is believed to be a self-portrait.
- Born: Fede Galizia c. 1578; Milan
- Died: c. 1630; Milan
- Known for: Painting
- Movement: Mannerism

Fede Galizia (c. 1578 – c. 1630) was an Italian painter of still-lifes, portraits, and religious pictures. She is especially noted as a painter of still-lifes of fruit, a genre in which she was one of the earliest practitioners in European art. She is perhaps not as well known as other female artists, such as Angelica Kauffman and Élisabeth Vigée Le Brun, because she did not have access to court-oriented or aristocratic social circles, nor had she sought the particular patronage of political rulers and noblemen.

== Life ==
Fede Galizia was born in Milan, probably in 1578. Her father, Nunzio Galizia, also a painter of miniatures, had moved to Milan from Trento. Fede (whose name means "faith") learned painting and likely also engraving from him. By the age of twelve, she was sufficiently accomplished as an artist to be mentioned by Gian Paolo Lomazzo, a painter and art theorist friend of her father, who wrote, "[T]his girl dedicates herself to imitate the most extraordinary of our art." By her later teen years, she had established an international reputation as an artist.

At a young age, Galizia was already an established portrait painter handling many commissioned works. Her father may have been inspired to train his daughter by the example of Sofonisba Anguissola, who was from Cremona, around 50 miles from Milan. Perhaps it was her father's influence as a miniaturist that led to Galizia's attention to detail in her portraits. Her treatment of jewels and clothing made her a very desirable portrait painter. She was often commissioned to paint religious and secular themes as well. Several of her paintings based on the deuterocanonical story of Judith and Holofernes, a popular theme in art of the period, survive in private collections. Perhaps her earliest was Judith with the Head of Holofernes painted in 1596, which is now in Sarasota, Florida at the Ringling Museum of Art. She also created miniatures and altarpieces for convents. Galizia never married or had any children, instead leaving her life items to a cousin, Anna Galizia, and a nephew, Carlo Henrico. On June 21, 1630, she made her will, and is thought to have died of the plague in Milan shortly afterward.

== Style ==
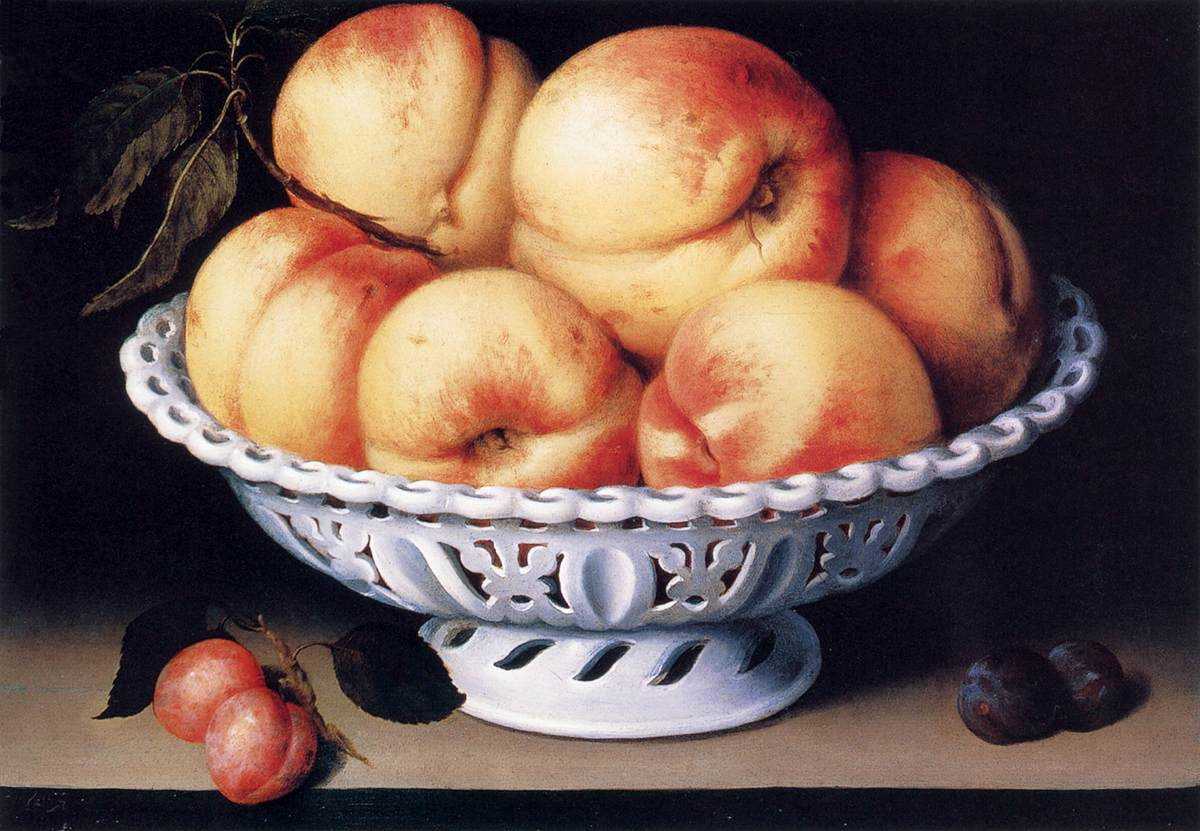
White Ceramic Bowl with Peaches and Red and Blue Plums (1610)

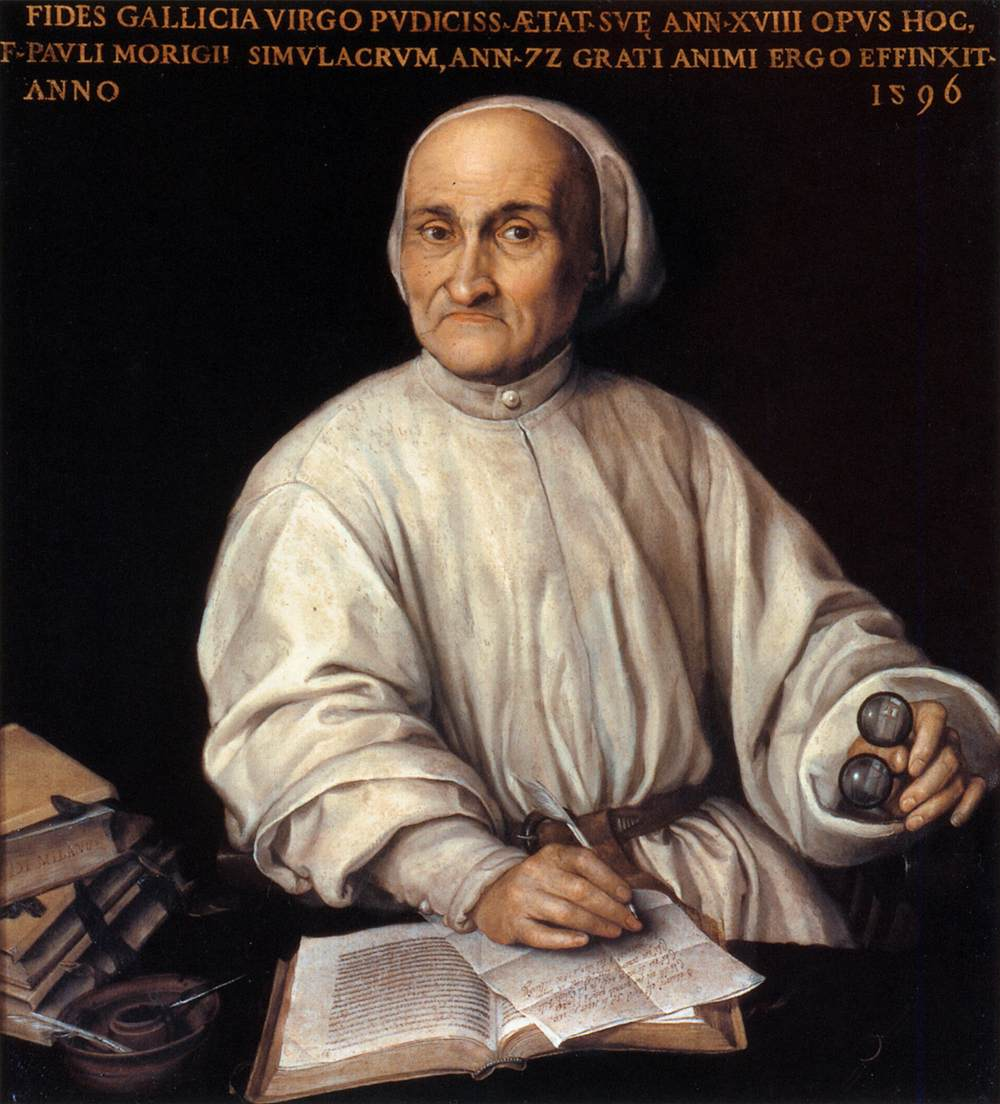
Portrait of Paolo Morigia (1592–1596)

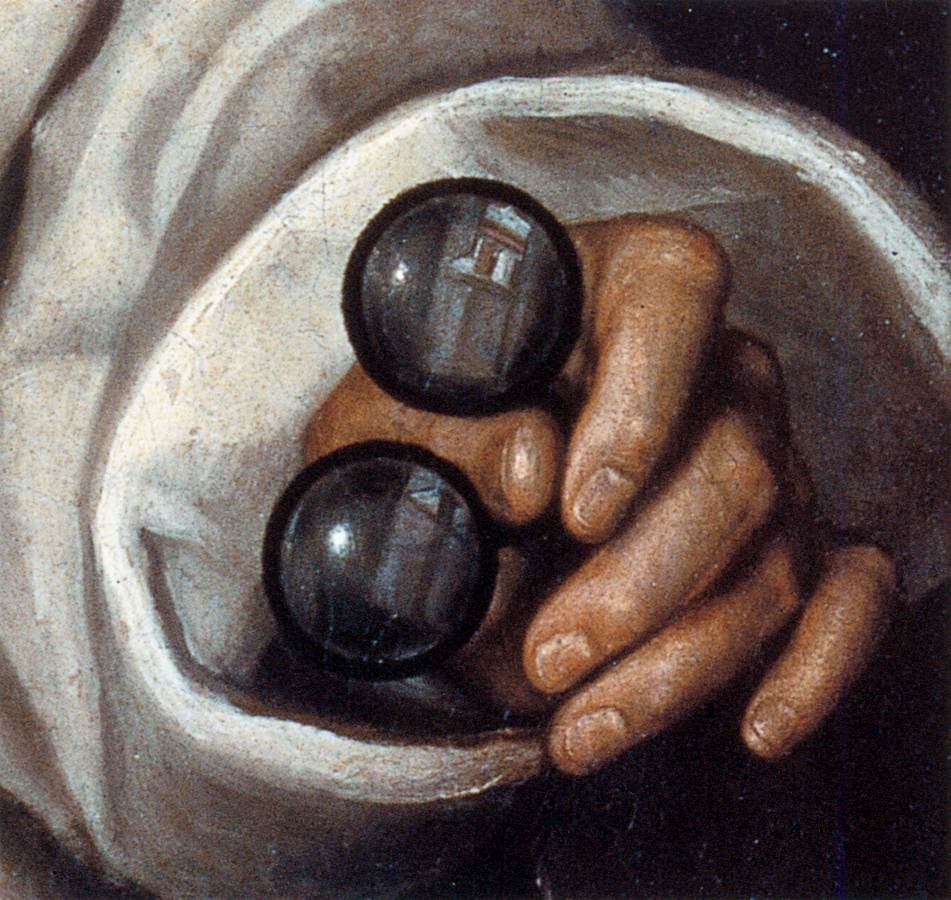
Close-up of reflection in the glass lenses of Portrait of Paolo Morigia (1596)

The style of her painting derived from the naturalistic traditions of the Renaissance in Italy, with a sharply realistic approach. Galizia's artistic skills are evident in her portrait of Paolo Morigia, General of the Jesuati, a scholar, writer and historian, and one of her earliest patrons and supporters. Her Portrait of Paolo Morigia (1596) depicts the subject writing a poem about the picture Galizia was painting. She received several public commissions for altarpieces in Milanese churches, including the Noli me tangere (1616; Milan, S. Stefano) made for the altar of Santa Maria Maddalena Church.

When not painting portraits, Galizia was primarily interested in painting still lifes, a genre in which she was a pioneer and for which she is best remembered. Although very few contemporary sources mention Galizia's still life paintings, they are the majority of her surviving works. Sixty-three works have been catalogued as hers, of which 44 are still-lifes. Her only known signed still life, made in 1602, is the first known dated still life by an Italian artist. However, her paintings were not given the recognition they deserved until well into the 20th century, when special attention was given to her work in studies made in 1963 and 1989.

Galizia showed a style related to the Lombard mannerism of the late 16th century, centred in Mantua, but known internationally, especially in France. Galizia’s still-lifes are among the earliest examples of painting in a new genre in which women, partly because they were excluded from other kinds of painting, would later excel. Galizia’s still-lifes differ from her father's works in their greater detail and more vibrant colours. Most of these works featured fruit centrepieces in simple, frontal arrangements. They were often composed of a basket or bowl filled with a single type of fruit, such as peaches or pears, with a few fruits, sometimes sliced, scattered at the base of the bowl.

Many of her still-lifes had fresh flowers or other fruits set on the counter to provide a noticeable contrast and scale, as seen in her work titled, Still-life with Peaches and a Porcelain and a Bowl. Galizia's work displayed the influence of such works as Caravaggio's Basket of Fruit. Associating with the more restrained style of the Counter Reformation period, she did not explore the more lavish compositions and forms taken up by many of her contemporaries working in this genre; she preferred instead a severe compositional style like that seen in Francisco de Zurbarán's slightly later still life paintings.

Another one of her notable paintings is Judith with the Head of Holofernes, depicting the biblical heroine Judith holding the severed head of the Assyrian general Holofernes. This painting is significant not only for its artistic merits, but also for its portrayal of a strong and assertive female figure, which was somewhat unconventional for this time period. Judith and the head of Holofernes was featured in the Baltimore Museum of Art, in the recent exhibition ‘Making Her Mark: A History of Women Artists in Europe, 1400–1800'.

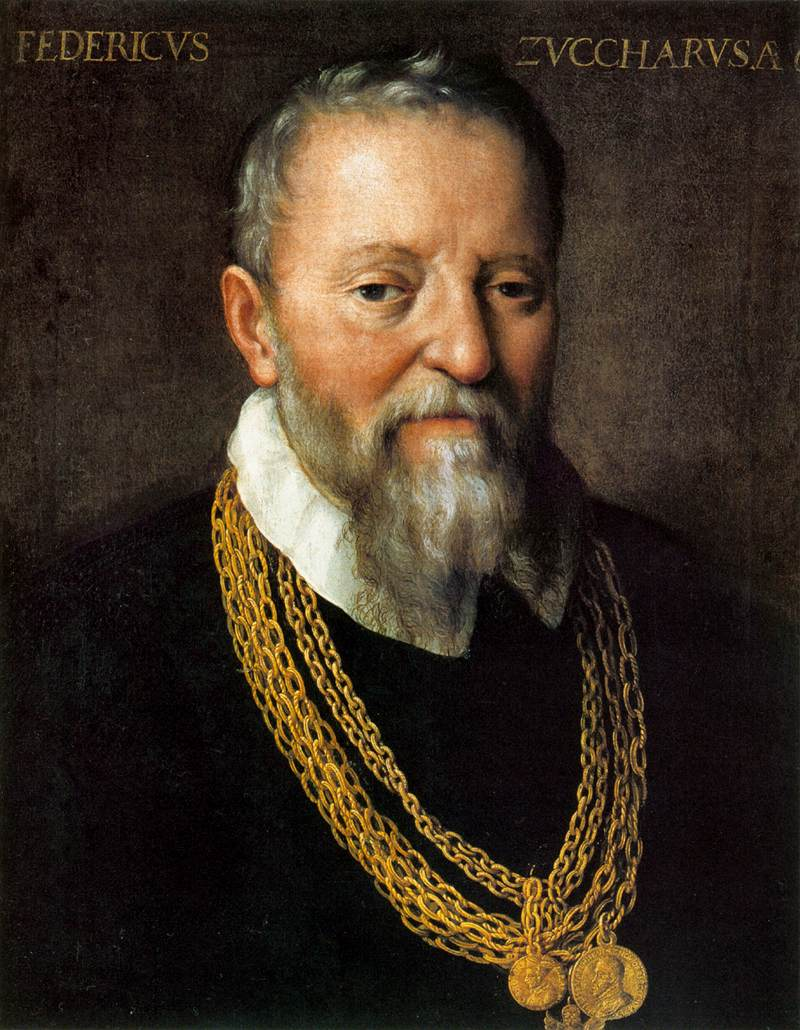
Portrait of Federico Zuccari (1604)

Galizia’s paintings were deft with detail, perfectly balanced, and her attention to shadow, light, and texture was unrivalled at the time. She was particularly good at creating inviting spaces in her paintings. Her compositions are not crowded. They look as if one could reach out and touch the fruit, grasp it, and pull it from the painting without disturbing the rest of the work. Her graceful, flowing arrangements were natural and poetic.

Portrait of Paolo Morigia (1596) was painted when Galizia was only eighteen. Each detail of the figure is painted in analytic detail. Galizia employs mimesis (imitation of reality) in the depiction of Morigia’s glasses: the reflection of the lenses shows the room Morigia is sitting in, thus heightening the illusion of reality.

Galizia is recognized as a pioneer in the treatment of still-life in European painting. Currently, it is unknown the number of paintings Galizia executed. Many works that could have possibly been hers have been attributed to her male counterpart Panfilo Nuvolone, who drew significant inspiration from Galizia. She may have inspired the Bergamese Francesco Codino and the Baroque still life painter Giovanna Garzoni.

== Notable Collections ==
Galizia's work is represented in numerous museums and public collections, including:

- The National Gallery of Art, Washington. Still Life of Apples, Pears, Cucumbers, Figs, and a Melon, c. 1625–1630, 2023.3.2
- John and Mable Ringling Museum of Art. Judith and Holofernes, 1590s, SN684
- Pinacoteca Ambrosiana, Milan. Portrait of Paolo Morigia, 1592–1595.
- Silvano Lodi Collection, Campione. White Ceramic Bowl with Peaches and Plum, ca. 1610.
- Muzeum Narodowe w Warszawie, Warsaw. Pedestal Plate with Southern Fruit, 1600-25.

== Gallery ==
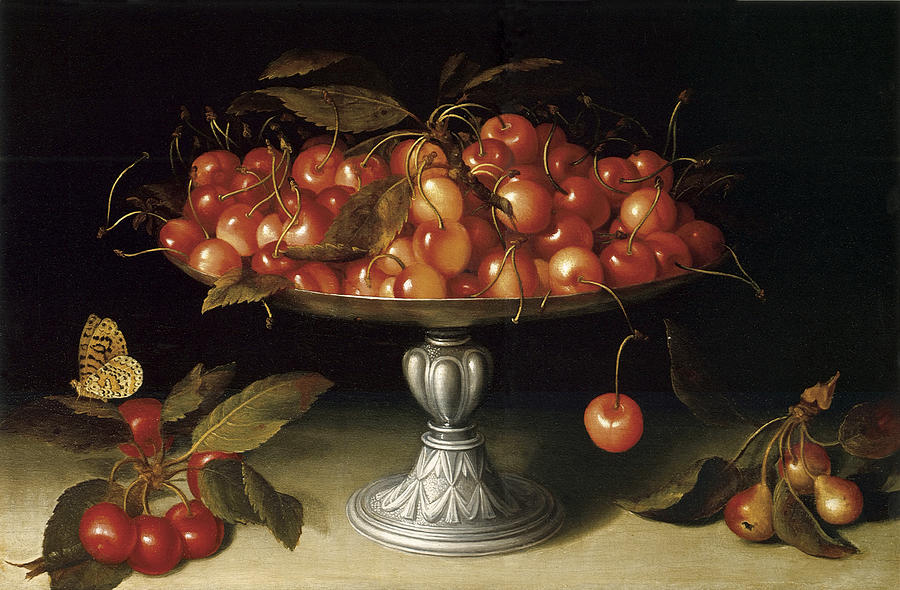
Cherries in a silver compote with crabapples on a stone ledge

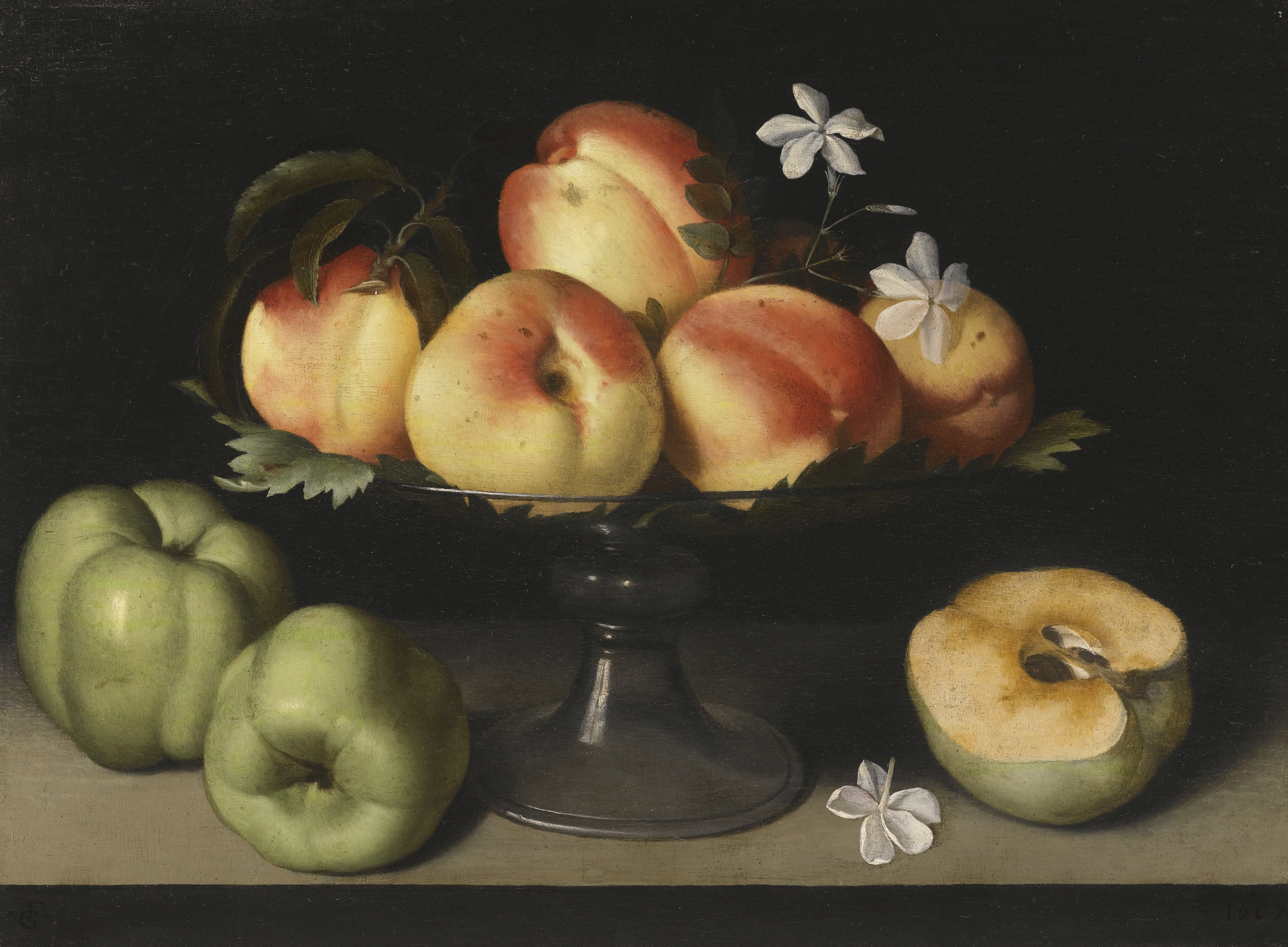
Glass tazza with peaches, jasmine flowers and apples, 1607

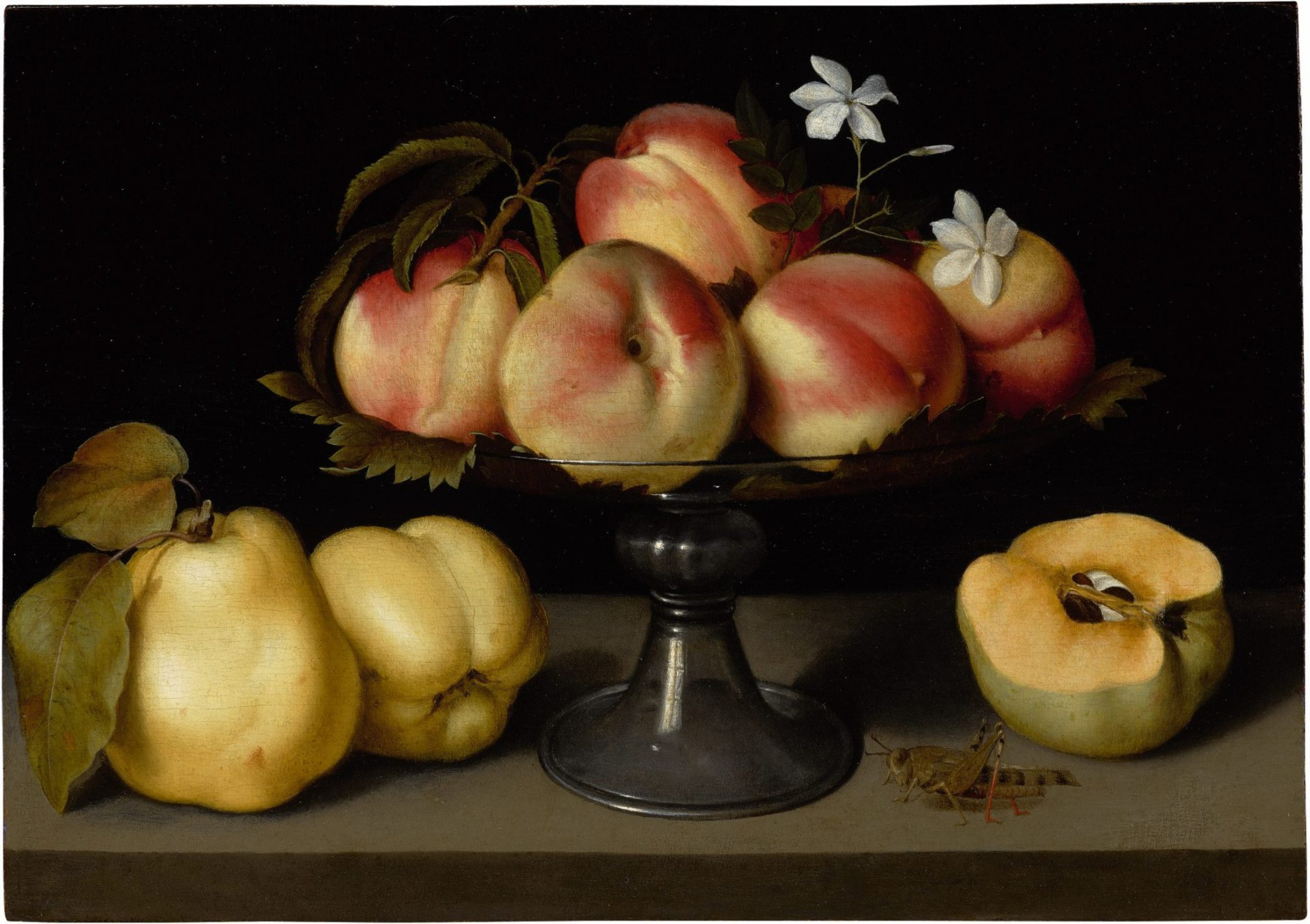
Glass tazza with peaches, Jasmine flowers, quinces and a grasshopper, c. 1610

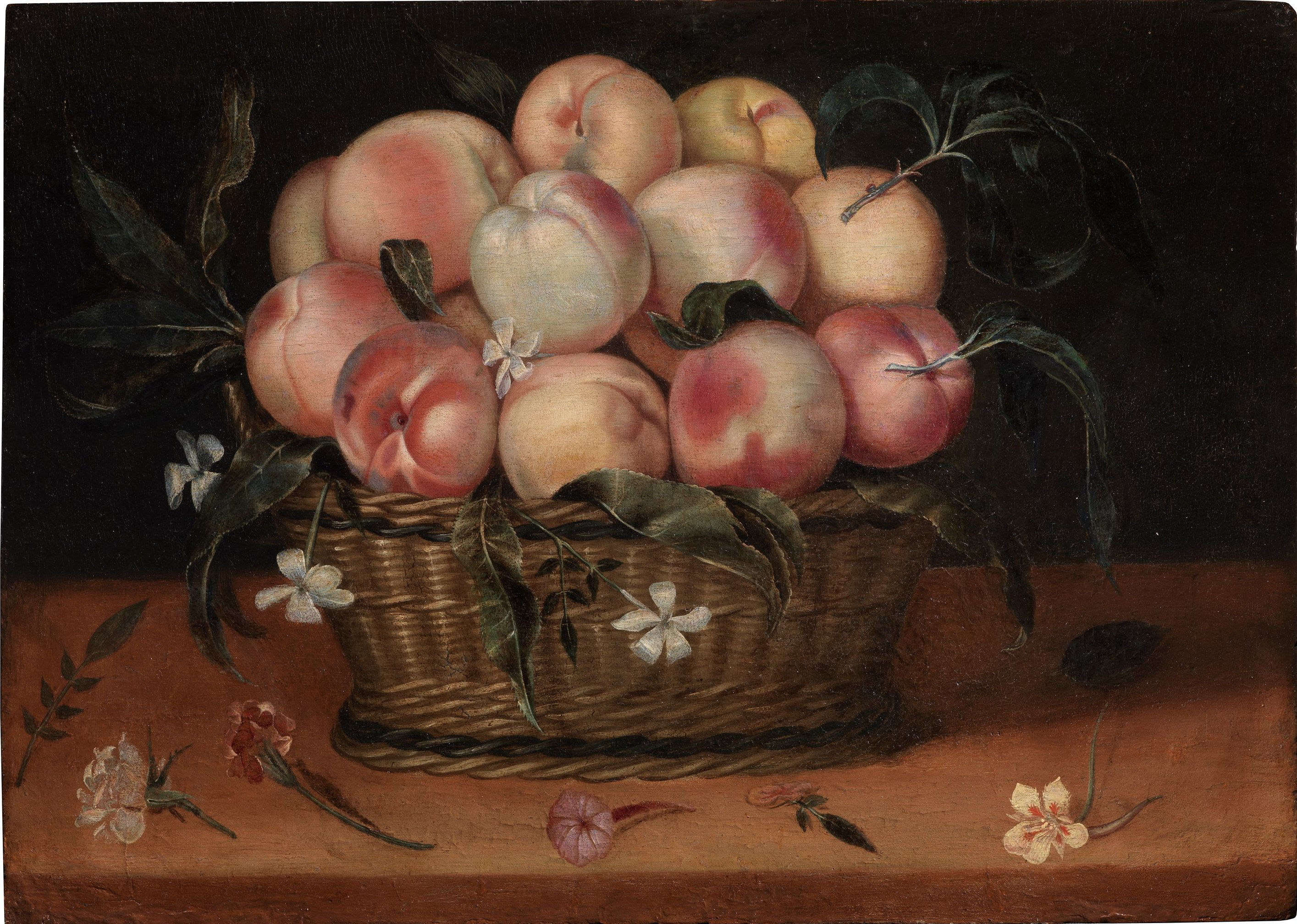
Wicker basket with peaches, jasmine flowers, rose and carnation

== Bibliography ==
- Banta, Andaleeb Badiee, Alexa Griest, and Theresa Kutasz Christensen, eds. Making Her Mark: A History of Women Artists in Europe, 1400–1800. Toronto, Ontario: Goose Lane Editions 2023. Published in conjunction with an exhibition of the same title, organized and presented at the Baltimore Museum of Art, 1 October 2023 – 7 January 2024 and the Art Gallery of Ontario, 30 March 2024 – 1 July 2024. ISBN 9781773103181
- Chadwick, Whitney, Women, Art, and Society, Thames and Hudson, London, 1990 ISBN 978-0-500-20354-5
- Harris, Anne Sutherland and Linda Nochlin, Women Artists: 1550–1950, Los Angeles County Museum of Art, Knopf, New York, 1976 ISBN 978-0-394-41169-9
- Segal, Sam (March 1998). "An early still life by Fede Galizia". The Burlington Magazine. CXL (1140): 164–171.
