= Muhammad ibn Yusuf al-Warraq =

Andalusían Historian and Geographer

Muhammad ibn Yūsuf al-Warrāq

Personal life
- Born: 904 Guadalajara
- Died: 973 or 974 Córdoba
- Era: Caliphate of Córdoba
- Region: Al-Andalus
- Main interest(s): Islamic history, geography

Religious life
- Religion: Islam

Muhammad ibn Yūsuf al-Warrāq (Arabic: محمد بن يوسف الورّاق) (* 904 in Guadalajara; † 973 or 974 in Córdoba) (in present-day Spain) was an Andalusían historian and geographer.

== Life ==
He spent many years in Kairouan and returned to Cordoba during the reign of Caliph al-Hakam II.

== Works ==
Al-Warrāq wrote for al-Hakam II a series of historical and geographical works on North Africa, none of which have survived whole, although many fragments of his extensive production are preserved in al-Bakri's Book of Roads and Kingdoms from one century later. From the extracts transcribed in al-Bakri's work relying on al-Warrāq, one can conclude that the latter was the first to mix geography and history. Any geographical subject is accompanied by its historical context and a detailed description. Ibn Hazm mentioned that his roots lay in the Berber tribal confederation of the Zenata.

== See also ==
- Al-Bakri
- Zenata
