= Al-Bakri (crater) =

Lunar crater

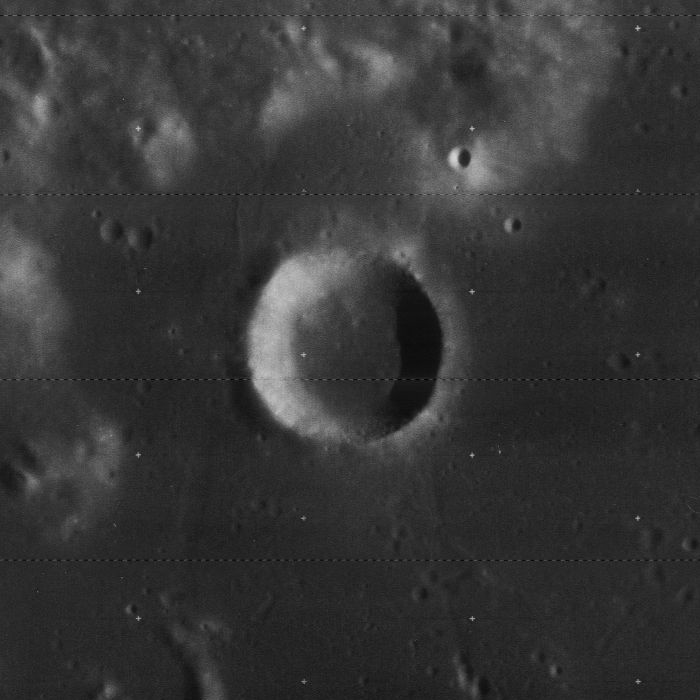
- Lunar Orbiter 4 image
- Coordinates: 14.34°N 20.25°E
- Diameter: 12.21 km (7.59 mi)
- Depth: 1.1 km (0.68 mi)
- Colongitude: 340° at sunrise
- Eponym: Abu Abdullah al-Bakri

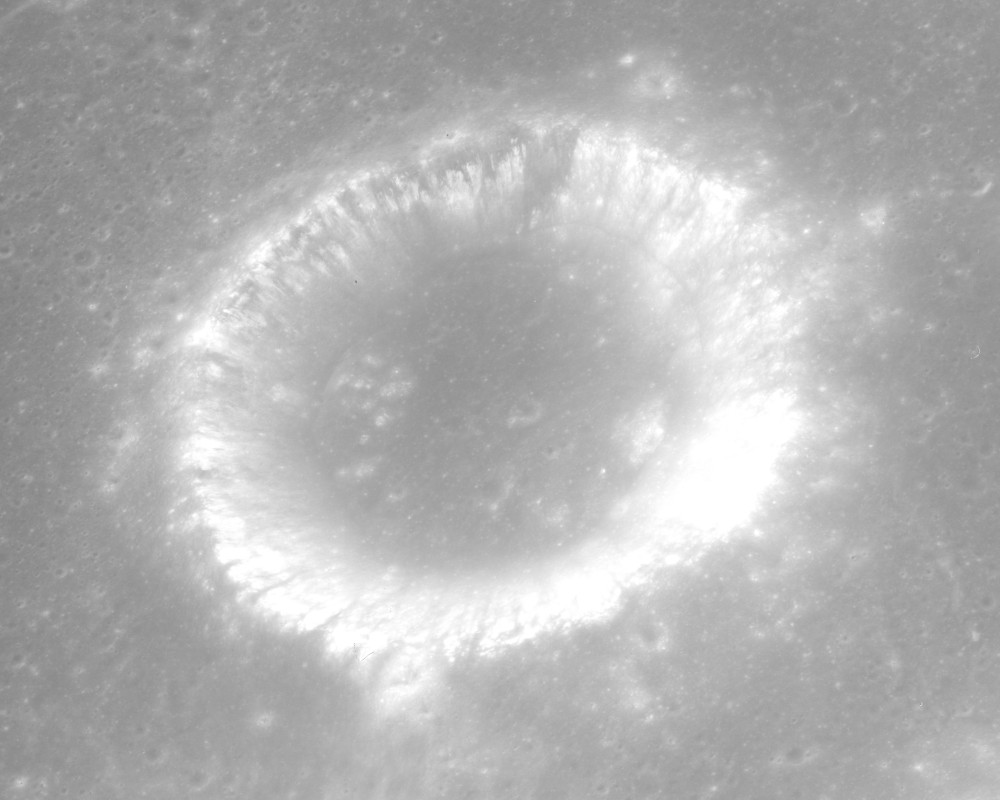
Oblique view from Apollo 15

Al-Bakri (Arabic: البكري) is a small lunar impact crater on the northwest edge of Mare Tranquillitatis. It is just south of the eastern arm of the Montes Haemus that borders the Mare Serenitatis to the north. To the east-northeast is the prominent crater Plinius. South of the crater are the rilles of the Rimae Maclear. The rim of this crater is rich in high calcium pyroxene, while the floor is mare material.

Al-Bakri was designated Tacquet A prior to being assigned a name by the IAU in 1976. It is named after the Spanish Arab geographer and historian Abu Abdullah al-Bakri (1010-1094). The tiny Tacquet crater lies to the northwest on the Mare Serenitatis.
