= Portrait of Paolo Morigia =

Painting by Fede Galizia

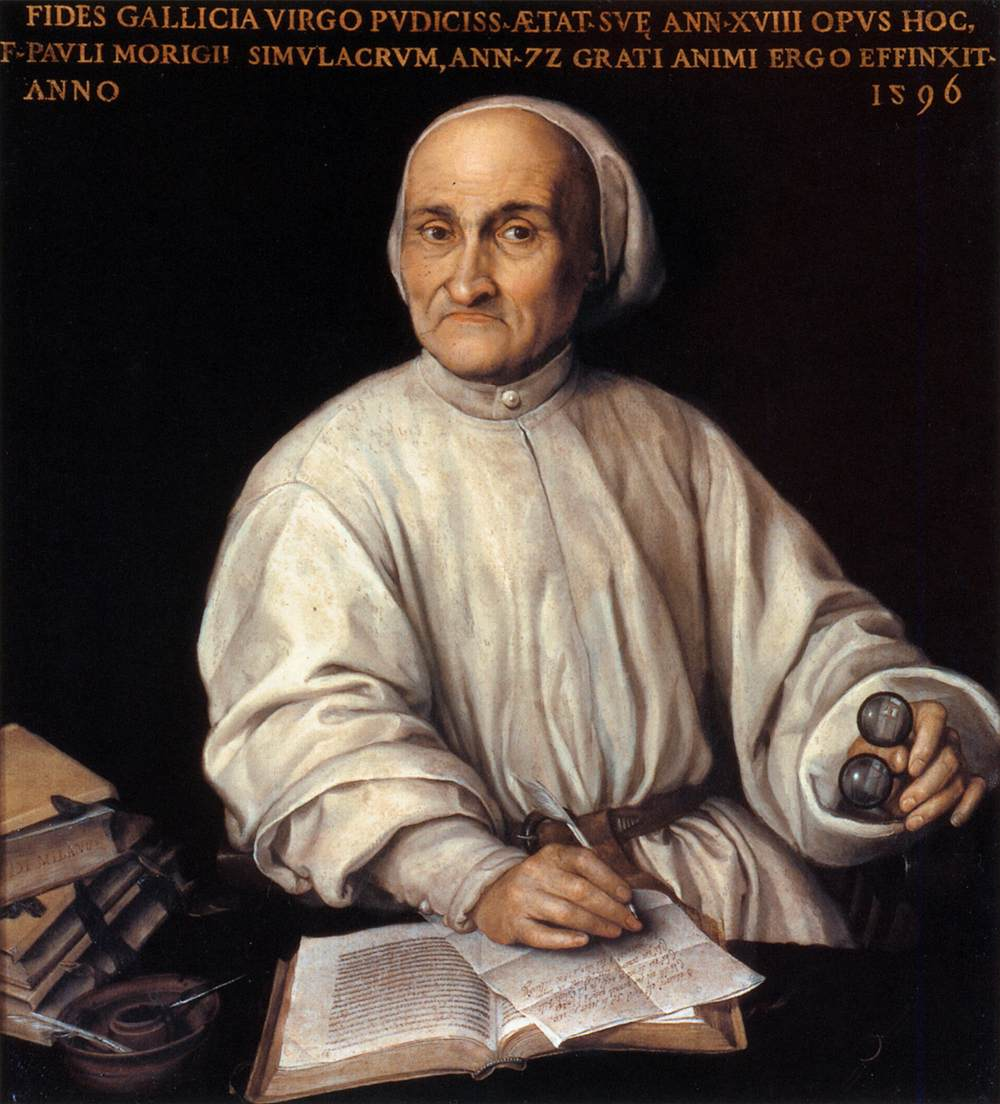
Portrait of Paolo Morigia (1592-1595) by Fede Galizia

Portrait of Paolo Morigia is a 1592–1595 oil on canvas painting by Fede Galizia, painted for the church of San Gerolamo in Milan and donated in 1670 to the Pinacoteca Ambrosiana in the same city, where it still hangs.

Fogolari described and dated the work based on the inscription at the top, which reads "FIDES GALICIA VIRGO PUDICISS. AETAT SUAE ANN. XVIII OPUS HOC F. PAULI MORIGII SIMULACRUM ANN. 72 GRATI ANIMI ERGO EFFINXIT. ANNO 1596". Later archival research by Berra showed that the inscription was spurious, however.

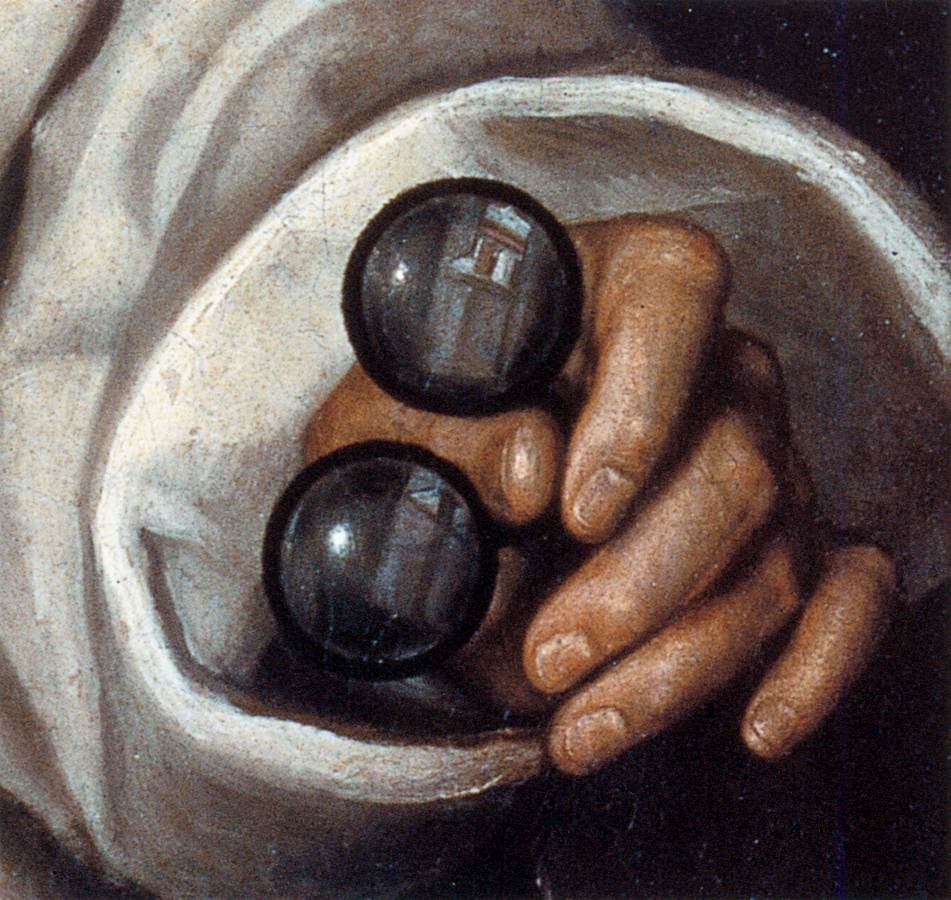
Detail of the spectacles

Its subject is the historian and Jesuit Paolo Morigia, holding spectacles in his left hand and writing the lyrics of a madrigal with his right. The reflection of the windows in the spectacle lenses shows the influence of contemporary Flemish art, whilst the great expressivity of the lips draws on Giovanni Battista Moroni's realism and the physiognomical studies then particularly popular in Lombardy thanks to Leonardo da Vinci.

The madrigal lyrics were published by Sutherland Harris and reading "Fu già GALITIA FEDE / Che per tenermi dopo morto in vita / Qui spirante, e qui vivo a te m'addita.". They are autobiographical and translate as "I once was GALIZIA FEDE / Who wanted to keep me alive after my death / Here expiring, and here alive, it points me to you." To the right is her book Historia dell'antichità di Milano, published in Venice in 1592. In his following book, the 1595 La nobiltà di Milano, Morigia praised a portrait of him by Fede Galizia. This allows the work to be securely dated between 1592 and 1595.
