= Al-Bakri =

Arab Andalusian geographer and historian (c. 1040–1094)

Abū ʿUbayd ʿAbd Allāh ibn ʿAbd al-ʿAzīz ibn Muḥammad ibn Ayyūb ibn ʿAmr al-Bakrī
- أبو عبيد عبد الله بن عبد العزيز بن محمد بن أيوب بن عمرو البكري

Personal life
- Born: 1040 Huelva
- Died: 1094 (aged 53–54) Córdoba
- Era: Caliphate of Córdoba
- Region: Al-Andalus
- Main interest(s): Islamic history, geography

Religious life
- Religion: Islam

Abū ʿUbayd ʿAbd Allāh ibn ʿAbd al-ʿAzīz ibn Muḥammad ibn Ayyūb ibn ʿAmr al-Bakrī (Arabic: أبو عبيد عبد الله بن عبد العزيز بن محمد بن أيوب بن عمرو البكري), or simply al-Bakrī (c. 1040–1094) was an Arab Andalusian historian and a geographer of the Medieval Maghreb (including Al-Andalus).

== Life ==
Al-Bakri was born in Huelva, the son of the sovereign of a short-lived principality established there by his family when the Caliphate of Cordoba fell in 1031. Al-Bakri belonged to the Arab tribe of Bakr. When his father was deposed by al-Mu'tadid (1042–1069) of the ruler of Taifa of Seville, he then moved to Córdoba, where he studied with the geographer al-Udri and the historian Ibn Hayyan. He spent his entire life in Al-Andalus, most of it in Seville and Almeria. While in Seville, he was there when El Cid arrived to collect tributes from Alfonso VI. He died in Córdoba without ever having travelled to the locations of which he wrote.

== Works ==
Al-Bakri wrote about Europe, North Africa, and the Arabian peninsula. Only two of his works have survived. His Mu'jam mā ista'jam contains a list of place names mostly within the Arabian peninsula with an introduction giving the geographical background. His most important work is his Kitāb al-Masālik wa-al-Mamālik ("Book of Highways and of Kingdoms") (كتاب المساليك والمماليك). This was composed in 1068, based on literature and the reports of merchants and travellers, including Muhammad ibn Yūsuf al-Warrāq (904–973) and Abraham ben Jacob. It is one of the most important sources for the history of West Africa and gives crucial information on the Ghana Empire, the Almoravid dynasty and the trans-Saharan trade. Although the material borrowed from al-Warraq dated from the 10th century, he also included information on events that occurred close to the time that he wrote.

Al-Bakri mentions the earliest urban centres in the trans-Saharan trade to embrace Islam, late in the 10th century, Gao was one of the very few along the Niger River to have native Muslim inhabitants. Other centres along the serpentine bends of the great river eventually followed: Takrur (Mauritania, Senegal); Songhay (Mali); Kanem-Bornu (Chad); and Hausa territories (Nigeria). By the 11th century, reports on these and other flourishing Islamic cities made their way north to Al-Andalus in southern Iberia, enabling Al-Bakri to write in his Kitab al-Masalik wa al-Mamalik (Book of Highways and Kingdoms): "The city of Ghana consists of two towns situated on a plain" and that "One of these towns, which is inhabited by Muslims, is large and possesses twelve mosques in one of which they assemble for the Friday prayer. There are salaried imams and muezzins, as well as jurists and scholars."

His works are noted for the relative objectivity with which they present information. For each area, he describes the people, their customs, as well as the geography, climate and main cities. Similar information was also contained in his written geography of the Arabian Peninsula, and in the encyclopedia of the world in which he wrote. He also presented various anecdotes about each area. Parts of his main work have been lost, and of the surviving parts, some have never been published.

== Legacy ==
The crater Al-Bakri on the Moon is named after him.

== See also ==
- Muhammad al-Idrisi, a 12th-century geographer who lived in Sicily
