= Book of Roads and Kingdoms (al-Bakri) =

Eleventh-century geography text by Abu Abdullah al-Bakri

- Author: Abu Abdullah al-Bakri
- Original title: كتاب المسالك والممالك
- Language: Arabic
- Subject: Geography
- Genre: Non-fiction
- Published: 1067-1068
- Publication place: Al-Andalus (present-day Spain)
- Media type: Manuscript

Book of Roads and Kingdoms or Book of Highways and Kingdoms (Arabic: كتاب المسالك والممالك, Kitāb al-Masālik wa'l-Mamālik) is an eleventh-century geography text by Abu Abdullah al-Bakri.

It was written in 1067-8 in Córdoba, al-Andalus (present-day Spain). Al-Bakri based his work on the accounts of traders, the writings of Muhammad ibn Yūsuf al-Warrāq, (On the Topography of North Africa), and Ibrahim ibn Yaqub. Despite the fact that al-Bakri never left al-Andalus, his writings are regarded as objectively reporting the accounts of other travelers by contemporary historians, and much of what he wrote is substantiated in other sources.

He described a wide array of regions from the Atlantic Ocean, through the Sahara, to Central Africa, giving descriptions of the geography, people, culture and political situation in each region. The Book of Roads and Kingdoms exists today only in fragmentary form. It is sometimes confused with a work by the same name written in the ninth century by Ibn Khordadbeh.
