= Ibrahim ibn Yaqub =

10th-century Hispanic Jewish merchant

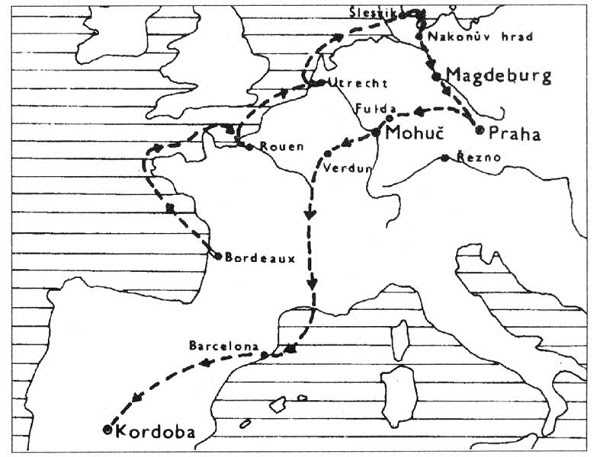
Ibrahim ibn Yaqub's journey.

Ibrahim ibn Yaqub (Arabic: إبراهيم بن يعقوب Ibrāhīm ben Yaʿqūb al-Ṭarṭūshi or al-Ṭurṭūshī; Hebrew: אברהם בן יעקב, Avraham ben Yaʿakov; fl. 961–962) was an Andalusi Jewish traveler from Tortosa known and esteemed in the 10th century for his knowledge in science, medicine, and geography. He visited the court of the Umayyad Caliph of Córdoba, Al-Hakam II, who enlisted him to travel to several European countries, especially the Holy Roman Empire of Otto the Great.

He was probably a merchant, who may have also engaged in diplomacy and espionage. His travelogue, Kitab al-Istibsar includes descriptions of various cities and regions as well as accounts of the customs and daily life of the people he encountered on his travels.

== Biography ==
His family hailed from Umayyad-ruled Ṭurṭūšah (now Tortosa) close to the mouth of the Ebro: he may also have lived in Córdoba. Some written and oral history and his writings suggest that he had a Jewish background. Nonetheless, it has also been argued by most historians that he was a Muslim of Jewish background, and Bernard Lewis states: "There is some uncertainty to whether he was a professing Jew or a Muslim of Jewish origin."

Sent by the Umayyad Caliph of Córdoba, Al-Hakam II, in 961–62 he travelled in Western and Central Europe and in Italy at least as far as Rome, where he was received with an audience with Otto I, Holy Roman Emperor during the first week of February.

Nothing is known about his return to al-Andalus (the Muslim-ruled part of the Iberian Peninsula), nor of any further travel. The memoirs and commentaries of his journey, possibly first presented to the Cordoban caliph Al-Hakam II (961–976), have been lost; only excerpts by later authors have been preserved, principally Abu Abdullah al-Bakri's Book of Highways and of Kingdoms and the work of Zakariya al-Qazwini, possibly via the writings of Al-Udri.

His work is widely known as providing the first reliable description of the Polish state under Mieszko I, the first historical ruler of Poland. He is also noted for his description of the Vikings living in Hedeby; of the Nakonid fortification at Mecklenburg Castle; and of what was, in all likelihood, the nucleus of the later ducal castle and palace at Schwerin. Ibrahim ibn Yaqub has a unique place in Czech history as the first person to mention the city of Prague and its Jewish community in writing. He also mentioned Czech Boleslaus I, Duke of Bohemia and Kraków as part of Duchy of Bohemia.

== See also ==
- Vineta
- At-Turtushi
- Benjamin of Tudela

== Bibliography ==
- "Ibrāhīm ibn Ya‛qūb al-Isrā’īlī al-Ṭurṭūshī," by Lutz Richter-Bernburg, in: The Oxford Companion to World Exploration, David Buisseret, editor-in-chief, 2 vols., Oxford UP 2007, I:402b-403b
