= Tacquet (crater) =

Lunar crater

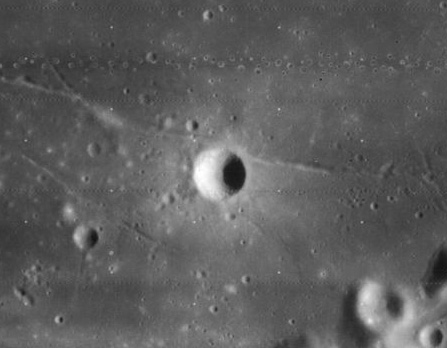
- Lunar Orbiter 4 image
- Coordinates: 16.64°N 19.20°E
- Diameter: 6.43 km (4.00 mi)
- Depth: 1.10 km (0.68 mi)
- Colongitude: 340° at sunrise
- Eponym: André Tacquet

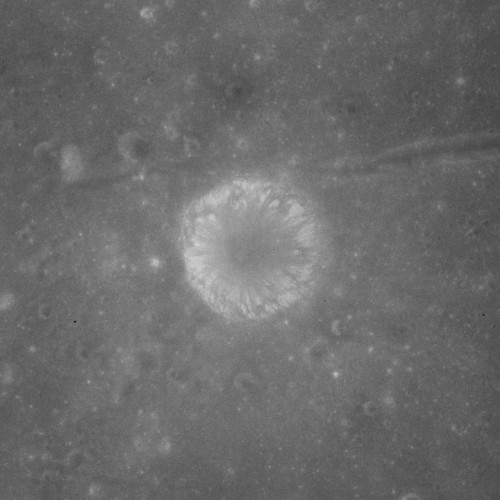
Apollo 15 image

Tacquet is a small, bowl-shaped crater that lies near the southern edge of Mare Serenitatis, in the northeast part of the Moon. The surface near the crater is marked by high-albedo ejecta. To the west is a system of rilles designated the Rimae Menelaus. It was named after Brabantian mathematician André Tacquet (1612-1660).

== Satellite craters ==
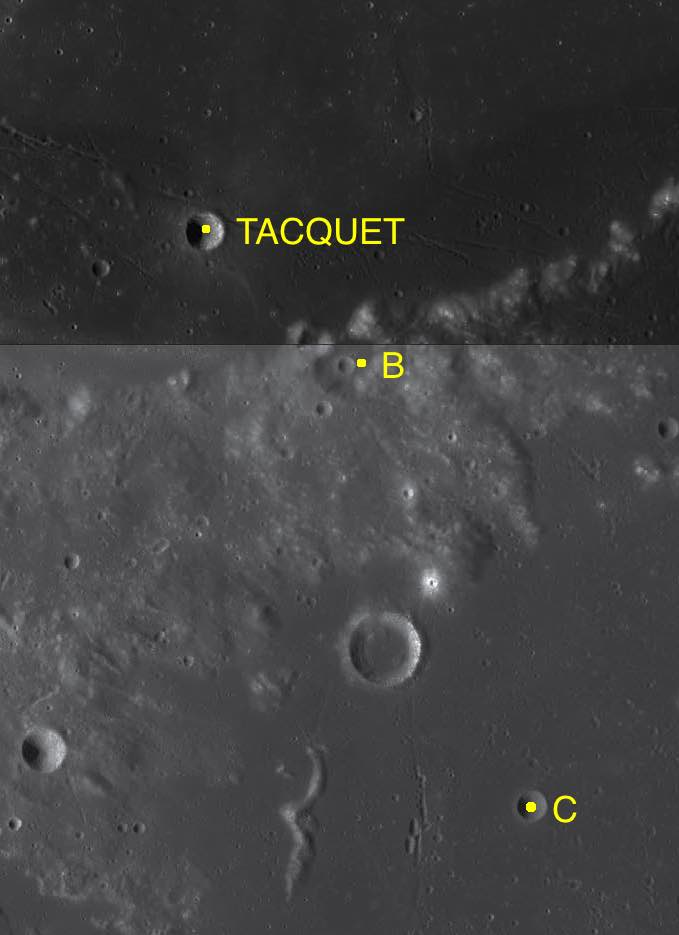
Satellite craters of Tacquet

By convention these features are identified on lunar maps by placing the letter on the side of the crater midpoint that is closest to Tacquet.

Tacquet	Latitude	Longitude	Diameter
B	15.8° N	20.0° E	14 km
C	13.5° N	21.1° E	6 km

The following craters have been renamed by the IAU.

- Tacquet A — See Al-Bakri (crater).
