= Giovanni Colombini =

Blessed Giovanni Colombini
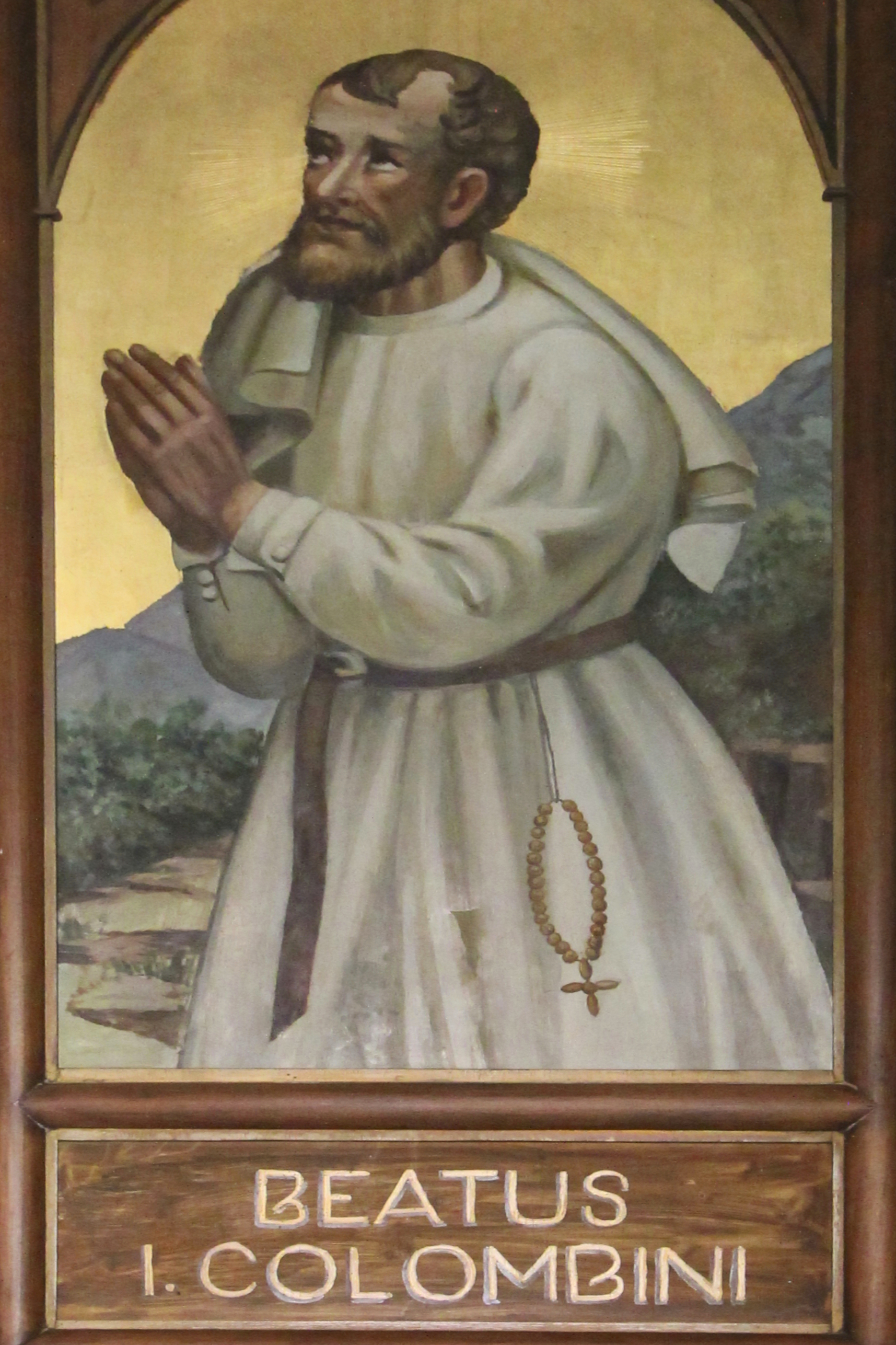

Founder of the Gesuati
- Born: c. 1304; Siena, Italy
- Died: 31 July 1367 (aged 63); Abbadia San Salvatore
- Honored in: Roman Catholic Church
- Beatified: 1583, Rome by Pope Gregory XIII
- Feast: 31 July
- Attributes: religious habit

Giovanni Colombini (c. 1304 – 31 July 1367) was an Italian merchant and founder of the Congregation of Jesuati (not to be confused with the Jesuits, the Society of Jesus, founded in the 16th century by Ignatius of Loyola).

== Biography ==
He was born at Siena into an old patrician family, he was several times elected gonfalonier. A biography of Mary of Egypt brought about a conversion in his life. He visited hospitals, tended the sick, and made large donations to the poor. After illness, he made his house the refuge of the needy and the suffering, washing their feet with his own hands.

His son having meanwhile died and his daughter taken the veil, Colombini with the approval of his wife, on whom he first settled a life-annuity, divided his fortune into three parts: the first went to endow a hospital, the second and third to two cloisters. Together with his friend Francisco Mini, Colombini lived henceforward a life of poverty, and begged for his daily bread. He was joined by three of the Piccolomini and by members of other patrician families, who likewise distributed all their goods among the poor.

Many of the Sienese complained that Colombini was inciting all the most promising young men of the city to "folly", and succeeded in procuring his banishment. Accompanied by twenty-five companions, Colombini visited in succession Arezzo, Città di Castello, Pisa and other Tuscan cities. He resumed on his return his former charitable occupations.

On the return of Pope Urban V from Avignon to Rome (1367), Colombini asked him to sanction the foundation of the followers' Institution. A commission appointed by Urban and presided over by Cardinal William Sudre, Bishop of Marseilles, having attested them free of the taint of the Fraticelli, whose views some people had accused them of holding, the pope gave his consent to the foundation of their congregation. The name Jesuati (Jesuates) had already been given to them by the populace of Viterbo because of their constant use of the locution "Praise be to Jesus Christ". From the very beginning, they had a special veneration for St. Jerome, whence the longer title, Clerici apostolici s. Hieronymi ("Apostolic Clerics of St. Jerome").

Urban selected as their habit a white soutan, a white four-cornered hood hanging round the neck and falling in folds over the shoulders, and a mantle of a dun colour; the soutane was encircled by a leathern girdle, and sandals were worn on the feet. Their occupations were to be the care of the sick, the burial of the dead, prayer, and strict mortification (including daily scourging).

Their statutes were at first based on the Rule of St. Benedict, modified to suit the aims of the congregation, but the Rule of St. Augustine was later adopted. Colombini died while moving to Acquapendente, a week after the foundation of his institute, having appointed Mini his successor. Pope Gregory XIII inserted Colombini's name in the Roman Martyrology, fixing 31 July for the celebration of his feast.

== Later history of the Order ==
Under Mini and his successor, Jerome Dasciano, the Jesuati spread rapidly over Italy. and in 1606 the Holy See allowed the reception of priests into the congregation. Some authorities have claimed that abuses crept in subsequently. The congregation was suppressed by Pope Clement IX in 1668 as of little advantage to the interests of the Church. Other scholars have argued that the order was suppressed in retaliation for the activities of its members such as Stefano degli Angeli in advocating Galilean theories as well as the method of indivisibles thought by the Jesuits to be contrary to church doctrine.

The Jesuatesses or Sisters of the Visitation of Mary, founded about 1367 at the suggestion of Colombini by his cousin Catharine Colombini of Siena (d. 20 October 1387), spoke as little as possible, fasted very strictly, and chastised their bodies twice daily. They survived in Italy until 1872.

== Sources ==
- Baluze, Étienne (1764). Giovanni Domenico Mansi (ed.). Miscellanea. Vol. IV. Lucca: apud V. Junctinium, sumptibus J. Riccomini. p. 566.
- Pardi, G. (1895). "Della vita e degli scritti di Giovanni Colombini da Siena". Bull. Senese Stor. II: 1–50, 202–30.
