= Stefano degli Angeli =

Italian mathematician (1623–1697)

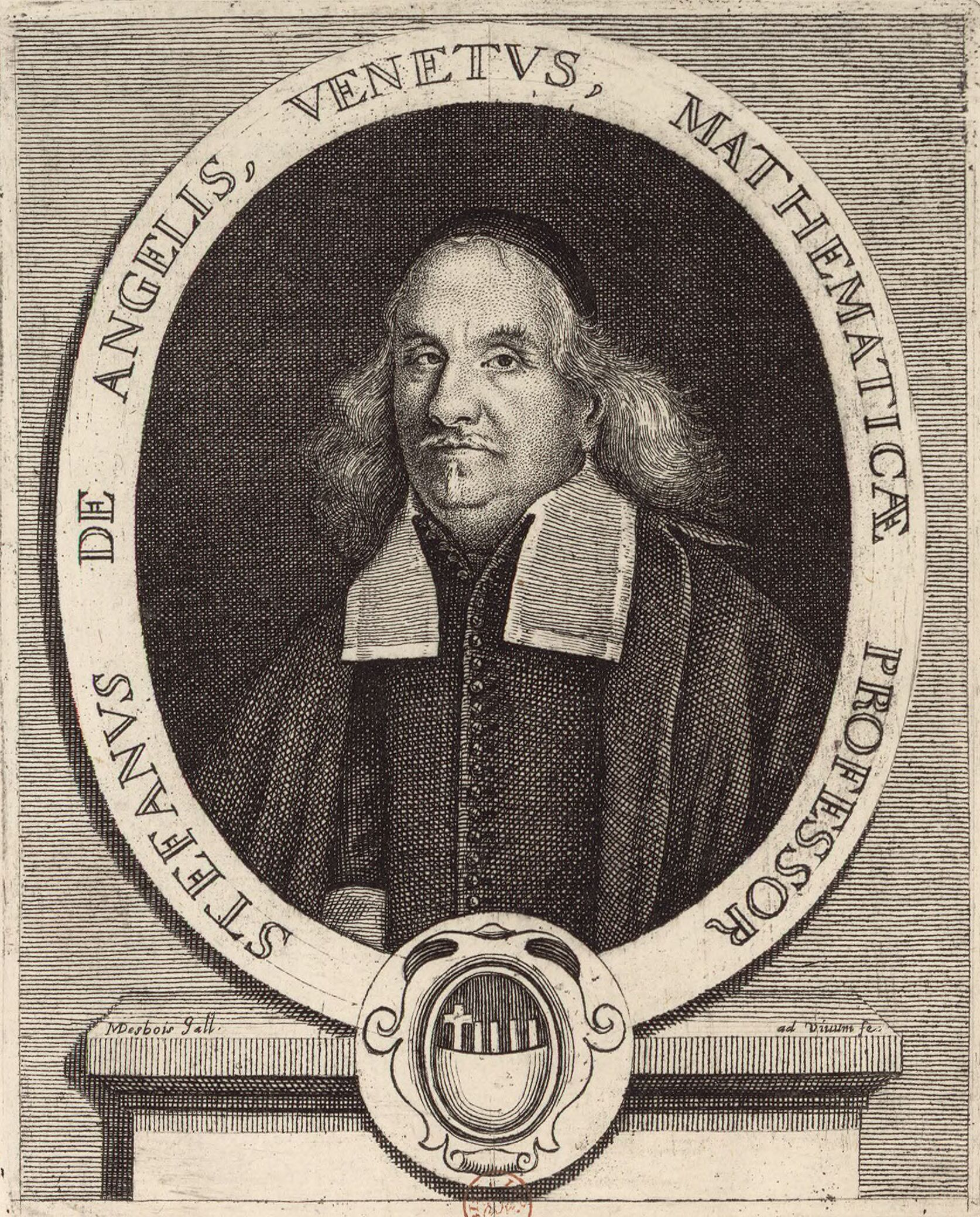
Martial Desbois - Stefano degli Angeli.

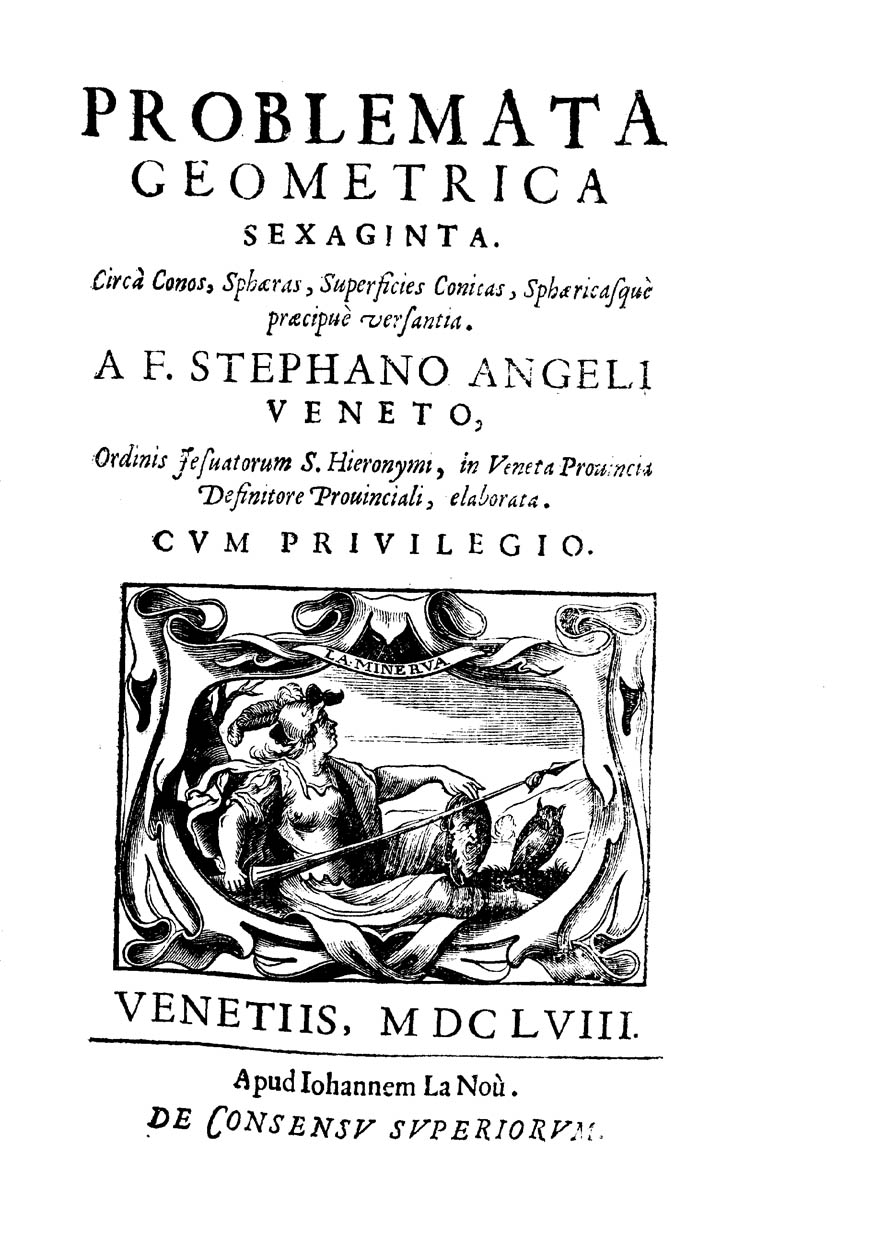
Problemata geometrica sexaginta, 1658

Stefano degli Angeli (Venice, 23 September 1623 – Padua, 11 October 1697) was an Italian mathematician, philosopher, and Jesuate.

He was a member of the Catholic Order of the Jesuats (Jesuati). In 1668, the order was suppressed by Pope Clement IX. Angeli was a student of Bonaventura Cavalieri. From 1662 until his death, he taught at the University of Padua.

From 1654 to 1667, he devoted himself to the study of geometry, continuing the research of Cavalieri and Evangelista Torricelli based on the method of Indivisibles. He then moved on to mechanics, where he often found himself in conflict with Giovanni Alfonso Borelli and Giovanni Riccioli.

Jean-Étienne Montucla in his monumental Histoire des mathématiques (Paris, 1758), lavishes praise on Angeli (II, p. 69).

== Move to Venice and defence of indivisibles ==
Angeli moved from Rome to his native city of Venice in 1652 and began publishing on the method of indivisibles. The method had been under attack by Jesuits Paul Guldin, Mario Bettini, and André Tacquet. Angeli's first response appeared in an "Appendix pro indivisibilibus," attached to his 1658 book Problemata geometrica sexaginta, and was aimed at Bettini. Alexander (2014) shows how indivisibles and infinitesimals were perceived as a theological threat and opposed on doctrinal grounds in the 17th century. The opposition was spearheaded by clerics and more specifically by the Jesuits. In 1632 (the year Galileo was summoned to stand trial over heliocentrism), the Society's Revisors General, led by Father Jacob Bidermann, banned teaching indivisibles in their schools. Cavalieri's indivisibles and Galileo Galilei's heliocentrism were systematically opposed by the Jesuits and attacked through a spectrum of means, be it mathematical, academic, political, or religious. Bettini called the method of indivisibles "counterfeit philosophising" and sought to discredit it through a discussion of a paradox presented in Galileo's Discorsi. Angeli analyzes Bettini's position and proves it untenable.

== De infinitis parabolis ==
In the preface to his work De infinitis parabolis (1659), Angeli examines the criticisms of indivisibles penned by Jesuit Tacquet, who claimed in his 1651 book Cylindricorum et annularium libri IV that

[the method of indivisibles] makes war upon geometry to such an extent, that if it is not to destroy it, it must itself be destroyed. Angeli writes that Tacquet's criticisms were already raised by Guldin and satisfactorily answered by Cavalieri. In his work, Tacquet asked rhetorically: "Who does this reasoning convince?" Angeli responds incredulously: Whom does it convince? Everyone except the Jesuits. Angeli proceeds to give an impressive list of European mathematicians that have accepted the method of indivisibles, including Jean Beaugrand, Ismael Boulliau, Richard White, and Frans van Schooten. Angeli is trying to portray the Jesuits as the lone holdouts against a method that is being universally accepted. However, as Alexander points out, the mathematicians cited reside north of the Alps. Of the three Italians that Angeli cites, Torricelli, Rocca, and Raffaello Magiotti, only the former had in fact published on indivisibles, and in any case by 1659 all three were dead. Despite his protestations to the contrary, Angeli was, in his own land, alone.

James Gregory studied under Angeli from 1664 until 1668 in Padua.

Andersen notes that Angeli, who was a Jesuat like Cavalieri, remarked that the circles opposed to the method of indivisibles mainly contained Jesuit mathematicians.

== Composition of the continuum ==
Tacquet warned that unless the method of indivisibles is destroyed first, it will destroy geometry. Tacquet's concern reflected the Jesuits' commitment to geometry as practised by Euclid, as well as their commitment to Aristotelian philosophy that rejected the notion that the continuum is made up of indivisibles. Angeli followed his teacher Cavalieri and argued that the composition of the continuum has no bearing on the method of indivisibles, and "even if the continuum is not composed of indivisibles, the method of indivisibles nevertheless remains unshaken". Angeli then went beyond his teacher's cautious advocacy of the method by declaring that the effectiveness of the method of indivisibles provides evidence that the continuum is, in fact, composed of indivisibles, contrary to the Jesuit position.

== Fall of the Jesuats ==
On 6 December 1668 Pope Clement IX issued a brief suppressing the Jesuati order, counting Angeli among its members, on the grounds that "no advantage or utility to the Christian people was to be anticipated from their survival". Writes Alexander: "It was a stunningly violent and unexpected end to an old and venerable order. Founded by the Blessed John Colombini in 1361 to tend for the poor and the sick, it had survived for [over] three centuries." While Angeli had previously published no fewer than nine books promoting and using the method of indivisibles, he did not publish a word on the topic ever again.

== Works ==
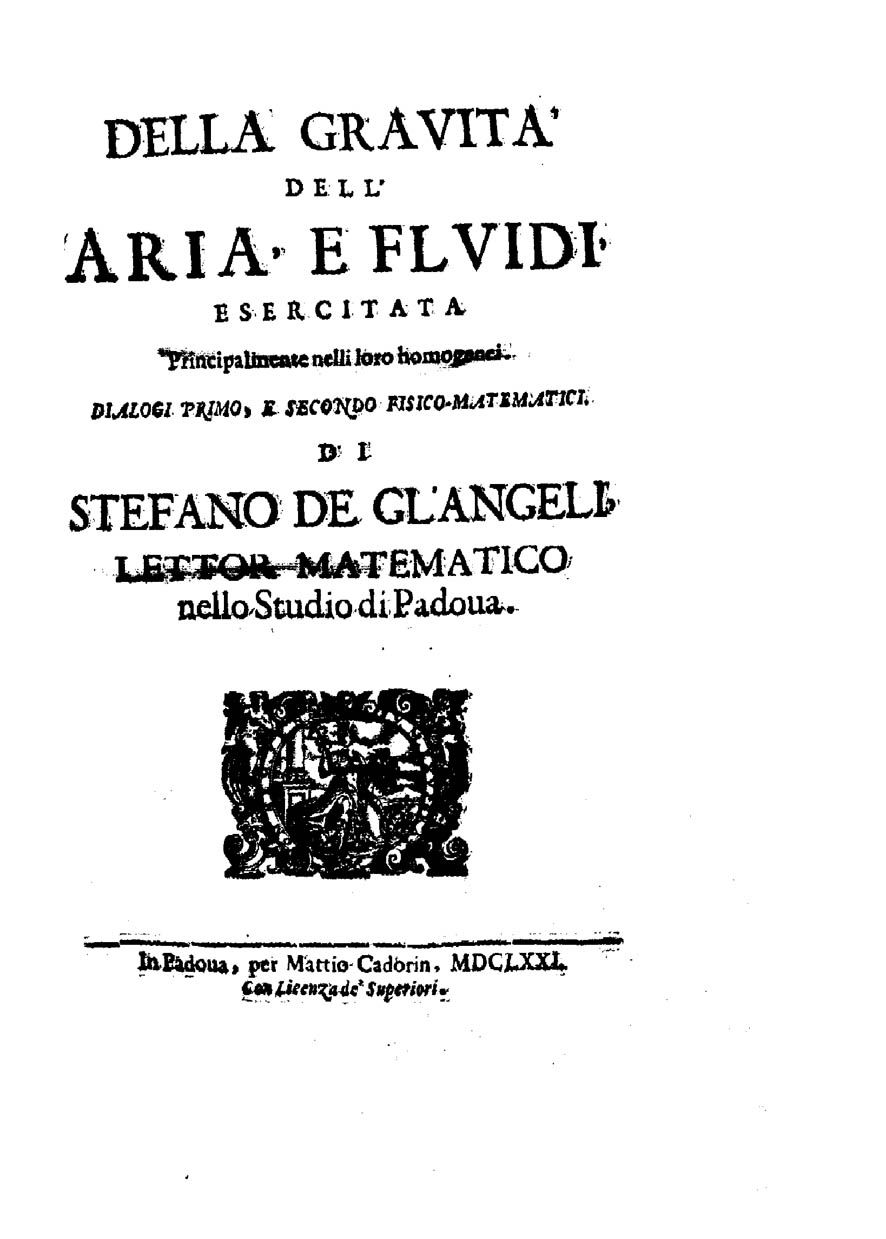
Della gravità dell'aria e fluidi, esercitata principalmente nei loro omogenei, 1671

- Problemata geometrica sexaginta (in Latin). Venetiis: apud Iohannem La Noù. 1658.
- De infinitis parabolis, de infinitisque solidis ex variis rotationibus ipsarum, partiumque earundem genitis (in Latin). Venetiis: apud Ioannem La Noù. 1659.
- Miscellaneum geometricum (in Latin). Venetijs: apud Ioannem La Noù. 1660.
- De infinitorum spiralium spatiorum mensura (in Latin). Venetijs: apud Ioannem La Noù. 1660.
- Accessionis ad steriometriam, et mecanicam, pars prima (in Latin). Venetijs: apud Ioannem La Noù. 1662.
- Della gravità dell'aria e fluidi, esercitata principalmente nei loro omogenei (in Italian). Padua: Matteo Cadorino. 1671.

== Sources ==
- Mario Gliozzi (1961) "Stefano degli Angeli", Biographical Dictionary of Italians, volume 3, Rome, Institute of the Italian.
