= Jesuati =

Italian religious order (1360–1668)

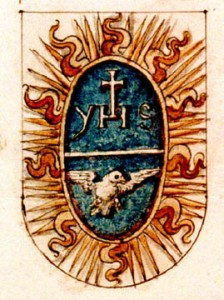
Jesuati

The Jesuati (or Jesuates) were a religious order founded by Giovanni Colombini of Siena in 1360. The order was initially called Clerici apostolici Sancti Hieronymi (from Latin: Apostolic Clerics of Saint Jerome) because of a special veneration for St. Jerome and the apostolic life the founders led. The order was abolished by Pope Clement IX on 6 December 1668.

== History ==
Colombini had been a prosperous merchant and a senator in his native city, but, coming under ecstatic religious influences, abandoned secular affairs and his wife and daughter (after making provision for them), and with a friend of like temperament, Francesco Miani, gave himself to a life of apostolic poverty, penitential discipline, hospital service and public preaching.

The name Jesuati was given to Colombini and his disciples from the habit of calling loudly on the name of Jesus at the beginning and end of their ecstatic sermons. The senate banished Colombini from Siena for "imparting foolish ideas to the young men of the city", and he continued his mission in Arezzo and other places, only to be honourably recalled home on the outbreak of the bubonic plague. Howard Eves writes that the order was then "dedicated to nursing and burying the victims of the rampant bubonic plague."

Colombini went out to meet Urban V on his return from Avignon to Rome in 1367, and implored his approval for the new order and a distinctive habit. Before this was granted, Colombini was required to clear the movement of a suspicion that it was connected with the heretical sect of Fraticelli. He died on 31 July 1367, soon after papal approval had been given. The guidance of the new order, whose members (all lay brothers) gave themselves entirely to works of mercy, devolved upon Miani.

== Suppression of the Order ==
Their rule of life, originally a compound of Benedictine and Franciscan elements, was later modified on Augustinian lines, but traces of the early penitential idea persisted, e.g. the wearing of sandals and a daily flagellation. Paul V in 1606 arranged for a small proportion of clerical members. Later in the 17th century the Jesuati became known as the Aquavitae Fathers, possibly because of the alcohol they administered as medical treatment of the sick they cared for.

The order was abolished by Pope Clement IX in 1668, perhaps because abuses had crept in. Amir Alexander wrote that it was likely in reaction to its support of the practitioners of the method of indivisibles, including Bonaventura Cavalieri and his students: this method was fiercely opposed by the rival, and more powerful, order of the Jesuits who viewed it as a religious threat.

Mathematician Bonaventura Cavalieri was a member from the age of fifteen until his death. Other illustrious members included Stefano degli Angeli and the poet Bianco da Siena.

The female branch of the order, the Jesuati sisters, founded by Caterina Colombini (d. 1387) in Siena, and thence widely dispersed, survived the male branch by 200 years, existing until 1872 in small communities in Italy.

== Bibliography ==
- Telesforo Bini, Laudi spirituali del Bianco da Siena, povero gesuato del secolo XIV, Lucca, G. Giusti, 1851 (Edition of poems I–XCII).
- Franca Ageno, Il Bianco da Siena. Notizie e testi inediti, Genova-Roma-Napoli, Società Anonima Editrice Dante Alighieri, 1939 (Edition of poems XCIII–CXI).
- Bianco da Siena, Serventesi inediti, edited by Emanuele Arioli, Pisa, ETS, 2012 (Edition of poems CXII–CXXII).
- Feo Belcari, Vita del beato Giovanni Colombini da Siena, fondatore de' poveri Gesuati con parte della vita d'alcuni primi suoi compagni, edited by Antonio Cesari, Verona, Tipografia erede Merlo, 1817.
- Vittoria Deudi, I Gesuati e il loro poeta Bianco da Siena, Bullettino senese di storia patria, 1911, XVIII pp. 396–412.
