= De motu antiquiora =

Mathematical book authored by Galileo Galilei

De motu antiquiora ("The Older Writings on Motion"), or simply De Motu, is Galileo Galilei's early written work on motion (not to be confused with Newton's De motu corporum in gyrum, which shares the abbreviated name, De Motu). It was written largely between 1589 and 1592, but was not published in full until 1890. De Motu is known for expressing Galileo's ideas on motion during his Pisan period prior to transferring to Padua.

Galileo left the manuscript unfinished and unpublished in his lifetime due to several uncertainties in his understanding and his mathematics. It is unclear whether this book was initially made out to be a book in the form of a dialogue or a more conventional way of writing. The reason for this is that Galileo worked on this book for many years, creating multiple copies of each section. In the last parts of his work, the writing style changes from an essay to a dialogue between two people who strongly uphold his views. Galileo would later incorporate select arguments and examples from his De Motu into his subsequent works Le Mecaniche (On Mechanics), Discorso intorno alle cose che stanno in su l'acqua (Discourse on Floating Bodies), and Discorsi e dimostrazioni matematiche intorno a due nuove scienze (Discourses and Mathematical Demonstrations Relating to Two New Sciences).

Throughout De Motu, Galileo rejects Aristotle's views on the physics of motion, often with mocking tones, through various reductio ad absurdum arguments that demonstrate how Aristotle's assumptions on motion logically result in absurd conclusions that were contrary to observation or against his original assumptions, thus proving that the assumptions must be false. However, despite his frequent stinging criticism of Aristotle’s physics, Galileo’s De Motu still clung to the classical elements as a foundational cause for motion in which all matter moves toward its respective natural place in the universe.

He further proposes an alternative theory to motion in which, instead of motion being propagated by the rushing of air (as was taught by the Peripatetics), it is believed that the true weight of a body can only be measured in a void, that the weight of the body in a medium is modified by its buoyancy in the medium (i.e., apparent weight), that the weight resulting from this buoyancy causes the body's natural motion, that projectile motion (distinct from natural motion) is believed to be the result of an impressed forced that modifies a weight of the projectile, and that the impressed force depletes over time much like how a hot object returns to its natural coldness.

De Motu is notable for containing the earliest reference of Galileo’s interest in pendulums in which he observes that heavier objects would continue to oscillate for a greater amount of time than lighter objects. However, he misattributes this phenomenon as evidence that the impressed force in a moving body self-depletes faster in lighter bodies than in heavier bodies as opposed to air resistance having a greater effect on the lighter body.

It’s questionable how much of Galileo’s ideas in De Motu were original. Some of the ideas of the De Motu are found in antiquity, others in the Middle Ages and among Galileo’s immediate predecessors in Italy. The subjects discussed in the essay are largely the subjects that had long been under discussion in academic circles, but while the solutions put forth by Galileo to individual problems are not, in general, original discoveries, the work as a whole gives a distinct impression of originality. This is due to the underlying unity of conception, the skillful linking of ideas, the constant recourse to mathematics, and the lucidity of the reasoning and the style.

== Publication history ==
De Motu may have been originally intended for publication, but Galileo eventually abandoned it in an incomplete form. What remains now includes a first draft essay on motion, several reworked portions of the essay, a dialogue, a set of topics and propositions, and a series of fragmentary thoughts, notes, and memoranda.

Portions of the manuscript were first published in 1854 in Volume 11 of Eugenio Albèri’s edition of Galileo’s works, and the remaining portions were published in 1883 by Antonio Favaro. The manuscript was later published under the title De Motu in volume I of the National Edition of the works of Galileo, edited in 1890 by Favaro, which contained certain manuscripts written in Latin in Galileo’s own hand. The first and only English translation of the essay portion of De Motu translated by I. E. Drabkin was published in 1960 under the title On Motion and On Mechanics, which was included alongside Stillman Drake's translation of Galileo's Le Mecaniche.

== Influences and origins of Galileo's Pisan dynamics ==
Historians have debated the exact influences and development of Galileo’s early dynamics during his Pisan period and whether his early concepts of impressed forces were directly descended from the medieval impetus theory of the 14th century.

Pierre Duhem proposed that Galileo’s Pisan dynamics was a continuation of the tradition taught by Jean Buridan and Nicole Oresme, in which Galileo continued to perfect the impetus theory throughout his career, potentially drawing influence from Giambattista Benedetti whose dynamics are generally described as a partisan of the impetus physics.

Alexandre Koyré also noted Benedetti's potential influence on Galileo but argued, against Duhem, that Galileo’s Pisan dynamics was an attempt to achieve a coherent mathematical formulation of medieval impetus modeled after Archimedes’ statics, but instead of perfecting it, as suggested by Duhem, Galileo ultimately failed, which led him to abandon the medieval tradition and began anew into his Paduan period.

Ernest Moody pointed out that Galileo’s arguments that rejected Aristotle’s explanation for projectile motion were exactly the same as those used by Buridan and Albert of Saxony, and was therefore not original; however, Moody argued against Duhem and Koyré that Galileo’s early dynamics were not modeled after the Buridan impetus, but rather based upon 11th-century Avenpace’s dynamics, which stemmed from the ideas of 6th-century John Philoponus of Alexandria. Moody suggests that it’s possible Galileo may have learned of Avenpace’s theories through Benedetti, but that it’s also possible that he may have learned of Avenpace through his contemporary, Jerome Borro, who wrote about Averroes’s criticism against Avempace’s arguments against Aristotelian physics. Further, Galileo was also influenced by his senior colleague at Pisa, Francisco Bonamico, who also discussed the problem of projectile motion in his own De Motu and mentioned that Philoponus is the originator of the theory of impressed forces. Moody suggests that Bonamico was acquainted with the medieval tradition of impetus physics, but only at a second- or third-hand account, especially in regard to the 14th-century contribution to mechanics, which is what led Koyré to assume that Bonamico’s views were an approximation of Buridan’s impetus and were the same as the impressed force theory of Philoponus, Peter John Olivi, and Francis of Marchia. Moody also credits the works of Benito Pereira, J. C. Scaliger, and Jacob Zabarella as potential influences.

== Distinguishing Galileo's early impressed forces from Buridanist impetus ==
Moody asserts that there is not only a developmental difference but also in meaning between Galilean impressed forces (virtus impressa) and Buridanist impetus: Buridan’s impetus was an “enduring reality” (res permanens) that would remain undiminished forever if left unimpeded by air and gravity, much like the modern treatment of momentum; whereas Galileo’s impressed forces were primarily self-depleting that is supplementally impeded by air resistance. This meant that the explanations for natural acceleration were radically different from each other since, for an object falling indefinitely in a void, the object’s Buridan impetus and speed would infinitely increase forever, whereas Galilean impressed force would eventually decay asymptotically to nothing as the object approaches a terminal velocity in the void.

Another further distinction is made regarding rotational motion, specifically in explaining the rotation of the celestial spheres. Prior philosophers, such as Avicenna, al-Ghazali, Moses Maimonides, and most Christian scholastic philosophers, thought that the rotation of the celestial spheres required a constant force to maintain its rotation, and identified Aristotle's “intelligences” that pushed these spheres with the angels of revelation, thereby associating an angel with each of the spheres. Buridan proposed that impetus wouldn’t need to posit angels or “Intelligences” as movers of the heavens, for if we suppose that God, at the creation of the world, set the heavenly bodies in motion at their present rates of rotation, no further action by a “mover” would be required, because their original impetus would endure undiminished forever, in the absence of resistance or of opposed forces. Galileo, on the other hand, only partially answers this question by asserting that the rotation of the celestial sphere is not the result of a forced motion since the spheres do not recede from the center of the universe, nor is it natural motion since spheres do not appear to approach a natural place. This further raised the question if the rotation of the spheres moved perpetually or if they would eventually come to rest in the absence of a force, however, Galileo leaves the question unanswered.

== Synopsis of the essay portion ==
Galileo arranged his essay into unnumbered chapters; enumerated chapters were later added by Drabkin to facilitate cross-referencing. The reader is cautioned that, although Galileo’s arguments may appear sound throughout, some of his arguments contain errors due to flawed premises or mathematics.

=== Chapter 1: Heaviness and lightness ===
Galileo begins by defining heaviness and lightness, which is effectively the equivalent of the modern concept of specific gravity or relative density. Two substances are considered equally heavy when they are equal in both volume and weight. A first substance is called “heavier” than a second substance when the first weighs more than the second while both are equal in volume.

In this same arrangement, the second substance is called “lighter” than the first; however, Galileo defines "lightness (levius)" in the sense of being "less heavy (in gravitate minor)" than something else in a relative sense. In other words, all things have some degree of inherent heaviness and not an inherent lightness. In later reworkings of the De motu, Galileo emphasizes this distinction by removing the use of "light" throughout the work with substitutions of "less heavy." Thus, a reworked chapter 2 begins with, "That heavier bodies are by nature located nearer the center, and less heavy farther from the center, and why." With this distinction, Galileo is able to emphasize that upward motion is indeed forced motion by a heavier medium rather than by the object's inherent levity.

=== Chapter 2: Heavy substances are by nature located in a lower place and light substances in a higher place ===
Galileo assumes a quasi-Aristotelian arrangement of the universe based on the classical elements where things move according to their proper place: earth rests at the center, water is above earth, air is above water, and fire is above air. Based on this arrangement, it appears Galileo assumes a Ptolemaic system that places Earth at the center of the universe, despite his later acknowledgment of Nicolaus Copernicus’s De revolutionibus orbium coelestium in Chapter 20.

Galileo indicates that Aristotle gave no reason for the arrangement of the classical elements other than that everything must be disposed in some arrangement as provided by divine providence; however, Galileo finds this view unsatisfactory and believes that Aristotle was potentially incorrect in his criticism of the ancient monist and atomist theories. He argues that, if the monists and atomists were correct, it would provide a logical explanation for the arrangement of the elements: heavier bodies would enclose more particles of that matter in a narrower space and would also occupy narrower places, such as those near the center of the universe (Galileo claims that spaces become narrower as we approach the center of a sphere without further elucidating his meaning). For example, earth elements occupy a small amount of space, whereas air elements occupy an ample amount of space. Galileo concludes that the arrangement of the universe isn’t randomly chosen, but is executed with both prudence and justice.

=== Chapter 3: Natural motion is caused by heaviness or lightness ===
Bodies (composed of the classical elements) are at rest when at their proper place, but when displaced above a lighter body, they will move down below the lighter body unless the lighter is forced to remain under the heavier. The converse applies to lighter bodies. For “natural” motion (as opposed to “violent” upward-projectile motion), both the heaviness/lightness of the body and the heaviness/lightness of the medium are to be compared, for if water were not lighter than stone, a stone would not sink in water. Galileo reemphasizes that heaviness/lightness (i.e., density) should be observed strictly as previously defined, as it’s not the weight of the entire body of water that is considered, but rather the weight of a portion of the water equal in volume to the body that is passing through the water. Motion is then correlated to the relative heaviness between two bodies, which Galileo sets out to prove in subsequent chapters.

=== Chapter 4: Proof that bodies of the same heaviness as the medium move neither upward nor downward ===
Said proof is provided.

=== Chapter 5: Proof that bodies lighter than water cannot be completely submerged ===
After providing said proof, Galileo concludes that it’s obvious that bodies heavier than water are necessarily submerged (for if it weren’t, then it would be lighter than water, and therefore contrary to its assumption) and must continue to move downward (for if they did not, then it must have equal or less weight than water). Moreover, since bodies that move downwards must be heavier than the medium, it can be said that heavy bodies move downward by reason of their weight.

=== Chapter 6: An analogy between bodies moving naturally and the weights of a balance ===
Since natural motion results due to the heaviness/lightness of the medium and the body, and since the respective heaviness/lightness can be compared through respective weights with equal volumes, Galileo recognizes that the same can be said of weights on a balance, and that, in viewing the lever as an analogy for motion, it can be easily understood why solids lighter than water (e.g., wood) are not completely submerged in water – the heavier cannot be raised by the heavy. Under this assumption, the cause of motion for bodies moving naturally (in the same manner as weights in balance), both up and down, can be referred to weight alone.

Through this lever analogy, a mobile moves by force and by the extruding action of the medium. For when wood is forcibly submerged, the water thrusts the wood back out when the water moves towards its own proper place. In the same way, a stone in freefall is thrust from its position and is impelled downward because it is heavier than the medium. Thus, natural motion may be considered “forced.”

=== Chapter 7: The cause of speed and slowness of natural motion ===
Differences in speed of motion occur in two ways: either the same body moves in different media, or different bodies move through the same media; furthermore, the case in which different bodies move in different media can be simplified down to these two ways. In both cases, the speed of motion depend upon the same cause: the greater or lesser weight of the media and the moving bodies. In this argument, Galileo focuses on the primary cause of motion rather than any “accidental” (e.g., the shape of the body) or external cause.

Aristotle claimed that the same body moves more swiftly in a rarer medium than in a denser medium, and that therefore the cause of slowness of motion is the density of the medium, and the cause of speed is rareness of the medium; however, Galileo points out that Aristotle asserted this claim on the basis of no other reason than from experience (i.e., we see a moving body move more swiftly in air than in water) and that this explanation of the cause to produce this effect is insufficient since there are many moving bodies that move more swiftly with natural motion in denser media than in rarer ones. For example, an inflated bladder of air falls slowly in air but rises quickly in water. Furthermore, Galileo notes that, for downward motion, a heavier substance moves more swiftly than a lighter, and for upward motion, the lighter substance will move more swiftly.

In the case of motion of the same body moving in different media, a body that is heavier than a medium will move more swiftly in the medium than in another medium in which the body is less heavy; moreover, a body that is lighter than a medium will move more swiftly in the medium than in another medium in which the body is less light. Therefore, if we find in what media a given body is heavier, we shall have found the media in which it will fall more swiftly. Furthermore, if we can find how much heavier the same body is in one media than another, we will know how much faster it will move.

=== Chapter 8: Different bodies moving in the same medium maintain a ratio of speeds different from what is said by Aristotle ===
Galileo states that two bodies may differ in two ways: 1) they are of same material but have different size (i.e., volume), and 2) they are of different material but a) they differ in size and weight, b) differ in weight but not size, or c) differ in size but not weight. He then refutes Aristotle’s claims for each situation.

Aristotle claims that, in the case of naturally moving bodies that are of the same material, the larger moves more swiftly, such that a large piece of gold would move more swiftly than a small piece, and that the ratio of their speeds is the same as the ratio of their sizes. Galileo asserts that this is ridiculous because this would imply that, for two lead balls, one ball a hundred times larger than the other, both falling from a great height, then the lighter ball would take a hundred times longer to fall than the heavier ball, but this does not happen.

Instead, Galileo argues that objects made of the same material, though different in size, will fall with the same speed, and that anyone surprised by this will also be surprised to realize that a large piece of wood will float no less than a small piece of wood. In another example, Galileo proposes that a piece of wax be mixed with sand so that it becomes slightly heavier than water and begins to sink slowly. When comparing a piece of mixed-wax that is a hundredth part of the first considered wax, Galileo argues that no one would believe that the smaller piece of wax would take a hundred times longer to sink. The same may be said for the analogy of weights on a balance: for two large and equal weights are balanced, and a minuscule weight is added to one side, the heavier side will fall, but it won’t fall any faster than if the two weights were small weights instead. Similarly, for water and wood, where one weight on the balance represents the weight of the wood and the other weight represents the weight of a volume of water that is equal in volume of the wood, if the weight of the volume of water is equal to the weight of the wood, the wood will not sink, but if the wood is made a little heavier so that it sinks, it will not sink faster than a small piece of the same wood, which initially weigh the same as an equally small volume of water, and then is made a little heavier.

In another argument, Galileo considers an assumption: if there are two bodies with one body moving with natural motion more swiftly than the other, then a combination of the two bodies will move more slowly than the body that, by itself, moves more swiftly, and also the combination will move faster than the body that, by itself, moved more slowly. For example, a ball of wax and an inflated bladder are both submerged in water and both move upward in the water, but the inflated bladder moves faster than the wax. If the two are connected to each other, the combination will rise more slowly than the bladder alone, but more swiftly than the wax alone. The same may be said for downward-falling bodies: if one is of wood and the other an air bladder, the wood falls faster than the air bladder, but when connected, together they fall with an intermediate speed. With this assumption, Galileo then returns to Aristotle’s claim that heavier bodies of the same material fall faster: if two bodies of the same material but different sizes (and likewise weights) fall with different speeds, then when connected together, the assumption leads us to believe that the combined bodies will have an intermediate speed; however, the combination of the two bodies will have a total weight that is greater than any of the standalone bodies. Therefore, according to Aristotle, the combined weight should fall even faster than either of the standalone bodies, which leads to self-contradiction. The only way to correct the contradiction is to reject Aristotle’s claim and assume that the two bodies of same material but different size (and weight) fall at the same speeds. This same argument will appear again in Galileo’s Two New Sciences.

A caveat is then recognized: the weights of the bodies of same material cannot be taken to the extremes, for even a thin plate or even a leaf of the same substance can be made to float on water. Thus, the weight and volume of the smaller must be large enough to not be affected by the viscosity of the medium. However, this caveat does not justify Aristotle’s original claim since it remains that the assumption that great differences in weight correlate to great differences in times is deeply flawed and must be rejected.

Galileo then considers the ratios of the speeds of bodies of different material moving in the same medium. Such bodies differ from each other in three ways: either in size but not weight, or in weight but not size, or both in weight and size; however, only the case of those that differ in weight but not in size need be considered since the ratios of the other ways can be reduced to this one. In the case of bodies differing in size but not in weight, we may take from the larger a part that is equal in size to the smaller, thus, the bodies will then differ in weight, but not in size. And the larger body will, with the smaller body, maintain the same ratio as will the part taken from the larger, since it was proved that bodies of the same material, though different in size, move with the same speeds. In the case of bodies differing both in size and weight, if we take from the larger a part equal in size to the smaller, again, we have two bodies differing in weight, but not in size. And the part will, with the smaller, maintain the same ratio in its motion, as will the whole of the larger – again, in the case of bodies of the same material, the part and whole move with the same speed.

Aristotle claims that, in the case of the same body moving in different media, the ratio of the speeds is equal to the ratio of the rareness of the media. Galileo proves that this assumption leads to an absurdity and is therefore false. If the speeds have the same ratio as the rareness of the media, then, conversely, the rareness of the media will have the same ratio as the speeds. Since wood falls in air but not in water, and since the speed in air has no ratio to the speed in water, then the rareness of air will have no ratio to the rareness of water, which is absurd.

Galileo then investigates the ratio of the speeds of the same body moving in different media during upward motion. When solids lighter than water are completely submerged in water, they are carried upward with a force measured by the difference between the weight of a volume of water equal to the volume of the submerged body and the weight of the body itself. In other words, Galileo argues that natural motion is based on an object's apparent weight. He concludes that if we wish to know at once the relative speeds of a same body in two different media, we take an amount of each medium equal to the volume of the body, and subtract from the weights of each medium the weight of the body. The numbers found as remainders will be to each other as the speeds of the motions. Similar arguments are then made for the ratios of speeds of two bodies equal in volume but unequal in weight moving the same media in both upward and downward motion.

By the end of the chapter, Galileo provides the ratio of the speeds for natural motion made of the same or different material, in the same medium or in different medium, and in natural motion upward or downwards. Galileo ends the chapter claiming that lighter bodies will initially move ahead of the heavier – a claim that is revisited in Chapter 22.

=== Chapter 9: In view of all the above, bodies moving naturally are reduced to the weights of a balance ===
Galileo investigates the force responsible for the motions explained in Chapter 8, specifically, the amount of force necessary to hold wood underwater, to which he concludes that wood moves upward with a force measured by the amount by which the weight of a volume of water equals to the wood exceeds the weight of the wood. Similarly, he investigates the force of a lead sphere as it moves downward in water, and he concludes that the sphere moves downward with a force equal to the weight by which it exceeds the weight of an aqueous sphere of the same size.

He then revisits the conclusion of the previous chapter: in the case of bodies of different material, provided that they are equal in size, the ratio of the speeds of their natural downward motions is the same as the ratio of their weights–and not their weights as such, but the weights found by weighing them in the medium in which the motion takes place. From this, Galileo recognizes that, when objects occupy a medium and we weigh the object on a balance, we don’t have the proper weight of the object since buoyancy in the medium will always modify it. He proposes that, if the objects could be weighed in a void, then hypothetically the proper weight could be found; however, Aristotle claims that motion in a void is impossible and that all things would be equally heavy in the void – a notion that Galileo rejects in the following chapter.

=== Chapter 10: Proof that, if there were a void, motion in it would not take place instantaneously ===
Aristotle cited several arguments in his attempt to deny the existence of a void. In one argument, he assumes that motion cannot take place instantaneously, and then attempts to show that if a void existed, motion in it would take place instantaneously; and, since that is impossible, he concludes that a void is also impossible. He further deduces that, assuming that motion can occur over time in a void, then the same body will move in the same time in a plenum and in a void, which he claims is impossible. Galileo argues that Aristotle failed to prove his assumptions, that they were actually false and led to false conclusions. In particular, Galileo asserts that Aristotle assumes that the ratio of the speeds of the same body moving in different media is equal to the ratio of the rareness of the media, which Galileo proved to be false in Chapter 8.

Aristotle’s proof also states that it is impossible for one number to have the same relation to another number as a number has to zero. Galileo argues that this is true for geometric ratios (i.e., the ratio of a/b), but is not true for arithmetic relations (i.e., a - b). Moreover, if the ratio of the speeds were made to depend on the ratio in the arithmetic sense (i.e., a ratio of differences), then no absurd conclusion would follow, and therefore the body will be able to move in a void in the same way as in a plenum.

In a plenum, the speed of motion of a body depends on the difference between its weight and the weight of the medium through which it moves; and likewise, in a void, the speed of its motion will depend on the difference between its own weight and that of the medium, but since the void is zero, then the difference between the weight of the body and the weight of the void will be the whole and proper weight of the body. Therefore, the speed of its motion in the void will depend on its proper weight, which is undiminished by any weight of the medium.

Galileo then rejects Aristotle’s claim motion in a void would be instantaneous since a void is infinitely lighter than any plenum and that motion in it will be infinitely swifter than any plenum. Galileo accepts the premise of Aristotle’s argument, but rejects the conclusion of instantaneous motion. Rather, he argues that the motion takes place in less time than the time of motion in any plenum.

=== Chapter 11: Disproving Aristotle’s claim that air has weight in its own place ===
Aristotle claimed that, with the exception of fire, everything, even air itself, has weight in its own region; for an inflated bladder weighs more than a deflated one.

Galileo disagrees: it’s understood that water has weight when in air, and that it moves downward because of its weight, but it’s absurd to believe that water sinks in water, as a first amount of water would need to displace upward a second amount of water. Moreover, if a portion of water is heavy and must move downward in water, then that would imply that the portion is heavier than another portion of water of equal volume – but this would be absurd since this would make water heavier than water.

In response to the inflated bladder, if a hole of the inflated bladder is opened but air stays in the ball without force (i.e., without compressed air), the bladder retains the same weight. But when the air is compressed into the bladder by force, the air in the bladder becomes heavier than free and diffused air. Galileo also argues that the elements, when in their proper place, are neither heavy nor light, for we do not feel the weight of water when we swim, and that it was previously shown that bodies lighter than water rise up, bodies heavier than water sink down, and bodies the same weight as water go neither up nor down.

=== Chapter 12: Disproving Aristotle’s claim that absolutely light and absolutely heavy exist; and even if they did, it would not be earth and fire ===
Aristotle defined that the “absolutely heaviest” are things that lay below everything else and always move towards the center of the universe, and he calls the “absolutely lightest” things that rise above everything else and always move up and never down. Thus, the heaviest is earth, and the lightest is fire. For if fire had heaviness, it would remain below something, which is not observed. Galileo rebuts that Aristotle’s argument is not conclusive, for it is sufficient for fire to be less heavy than everything else, and is not necessarily without weight.

Aristotle argues that, if fire had weight, then a large amount of fire would be heavier than a small amount, thus the large amount would rise slower. Similarly, if earth had lightness, then a large amount of earth would fall slower than a small amount. But experience shows the opposite. Galileo rebuts that this is also an invalid argument, for weight of a body is modified by the medium it is in. In other words, fire does not have weight in air. Secondly, a larger amount of fire does rise faster than a small amount–this was shown in Chapter 8. Galileo proposes that the correct way to reason about fire is that a large amount of fire will be heavier than a small amount of air, but not in the medium of air where fire has no weight, but in some other medium lighter than fire or even in a void. Also, if we assume that fire has no weight, then it is without density, but that which is without density is a void. Therefore, fire is a void, which is absurd.

Galileo then questions the claim that earth is the heaviest when we are unable to see below the earth. Moreover, it’s known that quicksilver (i.e., mercury) causes earth to float above it, so clearly there are things that are heavier than earth.

=== Chapter 13: Proof that differences in weights and motions are determined only in a void ===
Since in every medium the weights of heavy bodies are diminished by the weight of a portion of that medium equal in size to the solid, it is clear that whole and undiminished weights of solids are obtained in a medium whose weight is zero. Such medium can only be the void. Similar considerations hold for the speeds of motions and the ratio of these speeds.

=== Chapter 14: A discussion regarding the ratio of the speeds of bodies moving along various inclined planes ===
Galileo investigates the speeds of bodies moving down inclined planes; however, portions of his arguments are unrefined and contain errors. Galileo would later revisit this discussion (with corrections) in his lecture notes, Le Mecaniche, which utilizes his new abstract concept, momento, to roughly describe both modern concepts of moment and angular momentum. Mathematician Vincenzo Viviani would later insert an amendment to the second edition of Two New Sciences that refers to and incorporates portions of Galileo’s refined discussion of inclined planes from Le Mecaniche.

In this present discussion, Galileo recognizes from Chapter 9 that heavy bodies tend to move downward with as much force as is necessary to lift it up, thus if we can find how much force is needed to draw a body upwards on an incline, we would then know how much force the body would descends on the incline. To measure this force, Galileo reverts to the lever, but instead of lever arms that are parallel to each other, one lever arm is bent at an angle such that the force exerted at the bent lever arm is weakened. A weight positioned at the extremity of the bent lever arm would then experience the same force as if the same weight were on an incline that is tangent to the rotation of the bent lever arm. From there, a ratio of the force of the incline to a force that drives the weight vertically downward can be formed, which is then used to find the ratio of speeds (albeit erroneously).

In his argument, Galileo requires that objects hanging from a balance form perfect right angles with against perfectly straight horizontal lever arms, thus making the strings that hang the objects parallel to each other; an assumption that Galileo recognizes as flawed since the Earth is understood to be spherical, that bodies are drawn to the center of the Earth, and therefore the strings would actually draw lines that converge to the center and not parallel. In other words, Galileo argues that his assumption relies on a small-angle approximation. In the defense of his assumption, Galileo states, “To such objectors I would answer that I cover myself with the protecting wings of the superhuman Archimedes, whose name I never mention without a feeling of awe. For he made this same assumption in his Quadrature of the Parabola…yet we must not suppose, in a moment of doubt, that his conclusion is false, since he had earlier demonstrated the same conclusion by another geometric proof.”

=== Chapter 15: An argument that rectilinear and circular motions have a ratio to each other ===
Aristotle asserts that circular motion does not have any ratio to rectilinear motion because a straight line is not in any ratio to or comparable to a curve. Galileo rejects this stating that this would be like saying a triangle and a square are not comparable because the triangle has only three angles while the square has four. Even a circle inscribed in a square has some ratio even though the circle has curved edges while the square has straight edges. He further argues that Aristotle failed to see that the lines have a quantitative relation even if they are qualitatively different. Galileo further claims that Aristotle was reckless in asserting that there is no straight line equal to the circumference of a circle–Archimedes was able to prove this in his work On Spirals, where a straight line is found equal to the circumference of the circle around the spiral of first revolution.

=== Chapter 16: The question of whether circular motion is natural or forced ===
Galileo offers the question: if the center of a rotating marble sphere (and its center of gravity) were located at the center of the universe, would its rotational motion be forced or not? Galileo argues that since natural motion occurs when bodies move towards their natural place, and forced motion occurs when they recede from their natural place, then it's clear that the sphere rotating about the center of the universe moves with a motion that is neither natural nor forced. This leads him to argue that, if a single star were added to the heaves, the motion of the heavens would not be slowed since the star would only slow the rotational motion when it is moved away from its natural place, but this never happens for rotations about the center of the universe since there is no upward or downward motion.

Galileo then recognizes that this view raises another question: since the rotating sphere placed at the center of the universe is neither a natural motion nor a forced motion, would the sphere continue to rotate perpetually or eventually come to rest? For if its motion were natural, then it would seem to move perpetually; but if its motion is forced, then it seems that it would eventually come to rest. Galileo never directly addresses this question, and instead states that the question is better suited for Chapter 17 (where it is also left unanswered). However, Galileo does consider the case of a homogeneous spinning sphere that is outside the center of the universe, concluding that such motion is forced since there is resistance at the axis that supports the sphere. He further argues that if the axis were infinitely small, then no resistance would arise at the axis, and that a rough surface of the sphere would cause air to impede the rotational motion. For a heterogeneous sphere (i.e., where its center of gravity is different from the geometric center), the rotational motion alternates between natural and forced motion since the center of gravity would be rotating about the geometric center.

=== Chapter 17: The agency by which projectiles are moved ===
Aristotle argues that objects move due to contact with a mover, but since projectiles fly without contact from a mover, then it must be that the rushing of air behind the object is propagating its motion.

Galileo raises several objections to this explanation (most of which were recognized much before Galileo): the successive parts of air that push the projectile would always be accelerated, which is contrary to Aristotle’s assumptions; experience shows that arrows fly despite a strong opposing headwind; a ship propelled by oars against a current continues to move forward long after the oars are retracted from the water; iron balls can be flung at a great distance, and yet flaxen fibers fall to the ground sooner than the iron ball; lastly, a marble sphere can spin for a long time without displacing, thus leaving no space for air to push against it, nor is a flame placed underneath the sphere disturbed by any air currents.

Instead, Galileo argues that projectile motion results from an impressed force that gives the projectile a self-depleting impetus for its motion (as a side note, according to Drabkin, medieval philosophy historian E. A. Moody "sharply differentiates the development of Galileo’s theory of impressed force from Jean Buridan’s impetus theory"). Thus, this impressed force or impetus modifies the heaviness of a body when thrown upward, and the lightness of the body when thrown downward.

Galileo analogizes this impressed force to a temperature of a body, such that when a mover acts upon the body, it is much like placing iron in a fire, and once the projectile has left the hand of the mover, the impressed force diminishes much like how iron, once pulled from the fire, loses its heat and returns to its natural coldness. As to where in the projectile the impressed force is received, Galileo shifts the onus of the question by stating that the impressed force is wherever one believes heat is stored in the projectile.

He then compares the impressed force transferred from a mover to the mobile much like what is transferred from a hammer to a bell: initially both silent, the hammer impacts and imparts a sonorous quality to the bell which is contrary to its natural silence, and over time the sound gradually diminishes, much like an impressed force applied to a projectile. Moreover, Galileo argues that it’s not the air that continues to strike the bell to produce the sound, but rather the bell continuing to vibrate due to the impressed force received from the hammer.

He then elaborates further regarding the modification of weight due to the impressed force: although the body becomes lighter from the impressed force, the effect is only temporary, and throughout its motion the body still retains its natural weight while the modified heaviness or lightness diminishes over time. Furthermore, heavy objects tend to retain their impetus for a longer time than lighter objects.

Galileo then discusses how certain opinions, however false they may be, remain persistent because, at first sight, they offer some appearance of truth, but no one bothers to examine whether they are worthy of belief. He offers an example of a common misconception in which it is believed that water itself causes objects in it to appear larger. He says that he experimented with the phenomenon and found that a coin deep in water did not appear larger at all, but perhaps instead smaller. Galileo concludes that the misconception possibly arose due to the decorative tradition of placing fruits in a glass vessel filled with water in the summer, and that it was the curvature of the vessel that caused this largening effect and not directly because of the water.

He then concludes the chapter by emphasizing that it is certain that projectiles are in no way moved by the medium, but only by a motive force impressed by a mover.

=== Chapter 18: A demonstration that the motive force is gradually diminished in a moving body ===
Galileo argues that forced motion is not endless, that the force is continuously diminished in the projectile, and that motion with persistent speed and constant motive force “surely is most absurd.” Galileo would later abandon this erroneous idea through his implicit discussions regarding inertia in his Two New Sciences.

=== Chapter 19: The cause of acceleration of natural motion towards the end of motion ===
Galileo admits he struggled to find an explanation as to why objects accelerate toward the end of its motion. Although he states that he was excited to find a solution, the explanation he provides is mostly erroneous. Galileo would later provide a correct description of natural acceleration in his Two New Sciences: interlocutor Salviati, who represents an older Galileo, explicitly states that he would not provide an explanation as to the cause of such acceleration, but the explanation provided here is expressed by the interlocutor, Sagredo, who represents a younger Galileo.

Aristotle argued against such acceleration, stating that natural motion is not accelerated by extrusion since that would imply forced motion, but later, the Peripatetics would argue that it was the rushing of air behind the projectile that caused the acceleration. Galileo states that this doesn’t explain why a rhombus-shaped object would accelerate since the rushing air would become split by the edges of the shape and therefore unable to strike the object.

Instead, Galileo argues that, since a heavy falling body moves more slowly at the beginning, it follows that the body is less heavy at the beginning of its motion than in the middle or end and that this is the result of a force. The question then becomes: why is the body less heavy at the beginning of the motion?

He explains that, when a heavy body is moved upward by force, an impelling force greater than the resisting weight is required, otherwise the resisting weight could not be overcome. In other words, the body moves upward provided that the impressed motive force is greater than the resisting weight. But since that force diminishes over time, it will eventually become so weak that it cannot overcome the weight of the body, and then, at its apex, it reverses its course. However, at the apex, the impressed force is not entirely destroyed, but rather no longer exceeds the weight of the body and is equal to it. At that moment, the body is neither heavy nor light. After the apex, the impressed force continues to decrease with the weight of the body being the dominant driver of motion. However, at the beginning of the descent from the apex, the impressed force still contributes to the lightness of the body, despite being less than the weight, and hence why the motion of its descent is slower at the beginning.

Galileo then acknowledges that this explanation for acceleration was previously put forth by the philosopher Hipparchus as cited by Ptolemy in his Almagest, but Galileo believed Hipparchus’s explanation was imperfect and was rejected by subsequent philosophers as a result.

=== Chapter 20: A demonstration that, at the apex of projectile motion, an interval of rest does not occur ===
Aristotle and his followers believed that two contrary motions could not be continuous with each other, and therefore when a stone is thrown upward and falls back down, it must necessarily remain at rest at the apex for an interval of time. Galileo rejects this through a series of rebuttals, including a reference to the work De Revolutionibus by Nicolaus Copernicus. Galileo concludes that a state of rest at the apex does not occur over an interval, but instead passes through rest in an instant. This discussion is revisited in Two New Sciences.

=== Chapter 21: It is proved that if natural motion could be extended without limit, it would not become swifter without limit ===
Aristotle believed that if natural motion continued without limit, the weight of the body and the speed of its motion would be increased without limit, but since infinite weight and infinite speed cannot exist, he concludes that such motion would be impossible.

Galileo disagrees but instead argues that speed is not increased continuously, and even if it could, such that the motion could be extended without limit, the body would not attain infinite weight and speed. He argues that the impressed force of a projectile would eventually be used up, and that acceleration would eventually cease and thus the object would attain some terminal velocity (Galileo would later discuss terminal velocity again in Two New Sciences, but with the explanation that terminal velocity is reached due to air resistance and not because of some depletion of an impressed force). This argument suggests that Galileo believed that terminal velocity is achieved even in a void.

For example, it is observed that a feather falling from some height moves slowly at the beginning of its motion, but then later maintains a uniform motion. The reason being, according to Galileo, is that less heavy objects only carry an amount of contrary upward force equal to their own weight, and since they are not very heavy, the contrary impressed force is also small. Therefore, the impressed force is quickly depleted, thus quickly attaining a uniform motion in its fall. He also refers to the analogy of heat: a glowing iron eventually becomes cold with all its heat removed; likewise, a stone changes from light to heavy, losing all its received lightness, eventually attaining a uniform speed. Furthermore, the approach of such terminal velocity would be asymptotic, such as the hyperbola as discussed in the Conics of Apollonius of Perga, or the first conchoid curve of Nicomedes in the commentary of Eutocius of Ascalon regarding Archimedes’ On the Sphere and Cylinder, book 2.

=== Chapter 22: An explanation as to why, at the beginning of their motion, less heavy bodies move more swiftly than heavier ones ===
Averroes and his followers had proposed a solution to this question that supposed that elements were heavy in their own region, a proposition that Galileo rejected in Chapter 11. They also believed that a wooden sphere contains more air in it than a lead sphere, thus making the wooden sphere move more swiftly; further, it was believed that lead is heavier than iron in air because the lead contained more air than in iron – Galileo states that it’s obvious that this argument contains many complications.

Instead, Galileo proposes that, when objects begin their natural motion from rest, it begins with an impressed force that is equal but opposite to their weight (i.e., a hand or some device initially supporting the object provides the impressed force). As a result, heavier bodies begin their motion with a greater contrary force and thus fall more slowly at the beginning of their motion than lighter bodies, but once the contrary force is depleted, the heavier body then falls faster than lighter bodies, as is seen from experience.

However, he admits that there remains some difficulty with his proposed theory: even though heavier bodies begin with a greater amount of impressed force, they also have more weight that can overcome it, which suggests that the heavy and the light should fall with equal speeds. However, he responds that it’s not the weight that depletes the contrary force, but rather the contrary force depletes itself, much like how hot iron grows cold.

He then observes that impressed force depletes faster in lighter objects: lead flies further and with more time than wood when shot from a cannon; and when a pendulum made of wood and another made of lead are drawn with the same initial displacement and are permitted to swing, the lead pendulum swings for a longer period of time (this is the earliest reference of Galileo’s interest in pendulums; he refers to this example again in his Two New Sciences). Lastly, he argues that the impressed force is analogous to heat, such that heavier bodies retain both their heat and impetus for a longer amount of time than lighter bodies. Galileo then concludes from these examples that this explains why lighter bodies move faster than heavier bodies initially in their fall.

=== Chapter 23: An explanation why objects shot at a greater angle from the horizon move closer along a straight line than at lesser angles ===
Galileo recalls the earlier explanation for the inclined plane–that heavy objects are easily pushed when the inclines is at lesser angles, but when shot at an angle from a cannon, it seems the opposite is true. However, he notes that the difference here is that the object is no longer supported by an incline, but is instead carried by the impressed force.

To explain this phenomenon, he claims that the impressed force is impressed more strongly on that which resists its motion more. Thus, if we can find situations where an object’s resistance is greater, then so too will the impressed force be more impressed—pressing against an object’s motion offers more resistance than if the object were at rest or moves in the same direction. In other words, the resistance of the object is increased by the movement of its weight. For example, when playing stickball, the hitter wants the ball thrown towards them, allowing them to impress more force upon it since its resistance is greater, while it’s more difficult to impress a force when the ball is still, and even more difficult when the ball is moving away from the hitter. The same may be said when throwing a stone in which we must draw our hand back initially for the throw, and the same is said when a stone is shot by a slinger.

Under these observations, Galileo argues that, when firing a cannon, the iron ball offers more resistance in its motion when the cannon is aimed more vertically than horizontally, and thus fires straighter for a longer distance and time. Also, when the cannon fired is fired vertically, the ball cannot reverse course until its impressed force is depleted (this contradicts what is said in Chapter 19 where the impressed force is believed to be equal to the weight at the apex), but this does not happen when fired horizontally.

== See also ==
- Two New Sciences (Galileo's first published investigations of the motion of falling bodies)
