= Le Mecaniche =

Mathematical book on mechanics authored by Galileo Galilei

Le Mecaniche ("The Mechanics"; sometimes spelled Le Meccaniche in modern Italian) is a short treatise by Galileo Galilei, composed while he was teaching mathematics in Padua. The precise date of its most refined form is difficult, if not impossible, to determine, but it is generally dated around 1600 or earlier, and was unlikely revised after 1608. It was preceded by a brief version written around 1593, Galileo's first full year in Padua. The work was never printed during his lifetime but circulated in manuscript form among his students and colleagues.

The treatise examines the theory of simple machines, such as the lever, pulley, winch (i.e., windlass and capstan), screw, and inclined plane, drawing on classical sources such as Aristotle, Archimedes, Pappus, Philoponus, and Jordanus de Nemore, but reformulated through Galileo's mathematical perspective.

In the text, Galileo discusses principles of equilibrium, mechanical advantage, virtual velocities (speeds), and the impossibility of "cheating" nature, emphasizing that machines do not create force but only transform and transmit it.

Although Galileo's Mechanics is referenced in the Discorsi e dimostrazioni matematiche intorno a due nuove scienze (Discourses and Mathematical Demonstrations Relating to Two New Sciences (1638)), including a literal citation to the Mecaniche in amendments added by Vincenzo Viviani at the behest of Galileo, only selected portions appear there; most of the treatise is omitted, as the focus of the Two New Sciences was on the "new" aspects of his research.

The principle of virtual speeds, in its elementary form originating from Aristotle (whom Galileo credits), had remained undeveloped until Galileo. Certain ideas of conservation laws also emerge, particularly a local form of the conservation of energy. Galileo was the first to perceive that simple machines cannot create force or work but merely transform its application. His restricted principle of inertia, first stated in De Motu, also finds implicit application in the Mecaniche. Lastly, Galileo's early development of his Mechanics around 1595-97 would mark his first use and adoption of the term "moment" (momento) within a technical sense.

== Early drafts and publication history ==
According to Vincenzo Viviani's testimony, the first draft of the Mecaniche was written in 1593.

A few early drafts have been accounted for. One was discovered in Regensburg by Antonio Favaro in 1898 (found after the version in the Edizione Nazionale had been published) which differed from all the other copies of the manuscript. Favaro believed the Regensburg to be the first draft, used by Galileo as a guide for both public and private lessons held during his Padua period. The Regensburg copy includes an inscription that indicates that it was read by Galileo in the year 1594, which appears to confirm Viviani's claim. However, another draft was discovered by Stillman Drake in 1955, found in the Bauer Collection of the Institute of Technology in Pasadena, containing the coat of arms of Count Rocco on the cover. The Pasadena draft lacks a date inscription; however, it presents similarities with the Regensburg version and lacks the first six chapters. Drake argues that this Pasadena draft is the earliest and that it served as an outline for Galileo's lectures. Thus, the Pasadena version is presumed to have been written in 1593, as Viviani's testimony suggests. The definitive draft included in the Edizione Nazionale is believed to be dated 1598-1600. Neither the Pasadena nor Regensburg versions provide the initial "definitions" of which the final edition includes. Moreover, in both the Pasadena and Regensburg versions, "momento" appears in only one paragraph, used in the sense of a weight so small that it can be disregarded.

Galileo's manuscript on mechanics in Italian was widely circulated among his students and colleagues, often without listing his authorship, as he believed the work did not offer any novel ideas of his own.

Marin Mersenne translated the manuscript into French in 1634.

The first printed edition of the Mecaniche was produced in 1649 under the care of Cavalier Luca Danesi.

It was translated into English twice during the seventeenth century: first by Robert Payen in 1636 (unpublished), then by Thomas Salusbury in 1662 in volume 2 of his Mathematical Collections and Translations; however, most copies were destroyed in the great London fire—only eight copies have been found.

Carlo Manolessi would publish Mecaniche in volume 1 of his 1655 edition of the Opere di Galileo Galilei. Eugenio Albèri's edition of the Opere di Galileo Galilei, published in 1854, includes it in volume 11. Years later, in 1891, Antonio Favaro published Le Mecaniche in volume 2 of the Opere di Galileo Galilei.

In 1960 an English translation of the Le Mecaniche was published together with the De Motu under the title On Motion and On Mechanics, translated by I. E. Drabkin and Stillman Drake; it is based upon the Favaro edition.

== Critical reception ==
Clavelin argues that the Le Mecaniche combined three distinct trends in statics into an orderly and rational theory of simple machines: the Peripatetic tradition, whose origins are traced back to the Mechanical Problems; the Archimedean tradition; and a 13th century tradition originated by Jordanus Nemorarius, who produced the first proof in statics based expressly on the idea of virtual displacements, and a correct explanation of motion on an inclined plane.

The Mechanical Problems of the Peripatetic school provided the earliest known analysis of why small forces can move great weights by means of the lever, treating the problem implicitly as one in statics, using an approach that contained the beginnings of the principle of virtual velocities, but it should be emphasized that the Mechanical Problems never treated virtual displacements but only virtual velocities. It also described the behavior of the wedge, the pulley, the tackle, the forceps, and the nutcracker, reducing each to that of the lever; however, it failed to adduce a systematic theory of simple machines.

In the Archimedean tradition, Archimedes set out to transform statics into a demonstrative science, refusing, in his theory of the lever, to treat equilibrium in terms of virtual motions of the motive force and the resistance.

In the medieval statics tradition, Jordanus based the determination of equilibrium on the virtual motions of the ends of the balance beam. However, his arguments lacked rigor but led to an important transformation: equilibrium was based on the relative displacements of two weights, whereas, instead of considering speeds as the Mechanical Problems did, Jordanus considered the distances, which took the first step toward enunciating the general principle of virtual work.

By linking the 13th-century tradition with the other two traditions, their synthesis in the Mecaniche became a direct prelude to the modern reconstruction of statics on the principle of virtual work. Not only did Galileo take a view opposite to that of his chief predecessors and contemporaries (among them Guido Ubaldo del Monte and Benedetti), but by assimilating and then dominating the traditions, he was able to turn his Mecaniche into the first truly modern treatise on statics.

Regarding the analysis of the balanced lever, Clavelin agrees with Mach in his criticism that, just as Archimedes did, Galileo relied on the implicit assumption that the moment of a heavy body depends exclusively on its weight and on the distance of its center of gravity from its point of suspension. However, unlike Archimedes, Galileo’s approach was more general and efficient since it treated incommensurable and commensurable weights on the same footing.

=== The beginnings of Galilean momento ===
Galileo's Mecaniche presents his early adoption and transformation of momento into a technical term. Prior to drafting his Mecaniche, Galileo had made several attempts to correct the deficiencies and contradictions of his De motu, particularly with the system and definitions relating to gravitas, levitas, and his concept of force, virtus impressa; however, he ultimately abandoned the work.

Galluzzi indicates that, during the period spanning 1593 through 1600, Galileo consciously dedicated himself to reforming his lexicon, including his use of momento. As Galluzzi notes, the Pasadena and Regensburg versions of the Mecaniche first used momento without definition and only within a few sentences, wherein the term indicated a negligible amount of weight, which reflected the biblical expression momentum staterae. The years 1595-1597 then marked a period of intense research, definition, and introduction of the term that we now find in the definitive version of the text, making Galileo's momento a Paduan achievement. During the academic year of 1597-98, Galileo taught a course dedicated to the pseudo-Aristotelian Questions of Mechanics at the University of Padua. Galluzzi argues that, while preparing for this task, and stimulated by extensive readings of mechanical texts (he would have certainly have revisited, among others, Archimedes, Commandino, and Guidobaldo's Mechanicorum liber, he perhaps understood precisely then all the advantages that could derive from adopting momento.

In the analysis of the Mecaniche, Galluzzi argues that momento, as used in the text, "indicated both, in its etymology and in its most common use (the text and main commentaries and expositions of Aristotle's Physics), the tendency, the endeavor of bodies toward their 'proper' place, and, consequently, the speed with which they would have moved toward that goal. Such tendency derived directly from weight. Momento, therefore, indicated the 'instinct', the natural 'desire' of the heavy body to fulfill itself: ultimately, a rather intangible cause of motion, an 'occult' quality."

Clavelin argues that Galileo’s definition of momento is remarkable in that it enabled Galileo to accept the concept of moment in three distinct ways:

In the first, moment was used to refer to the force exerted by a heavy body as determined by its distance from the axis of the system, making it equivalent to the concept of static moment. Jordanus had only implicitly used the concept of static moment in his study of the bent lever, whereas Galileo’s Mecaniche was the first to make explicit use, which presided over his treatment of all simple machines. Galileo also added a definition of the center of gravity (i.e., center of heaviness), which used momento in the static sense. This definition of center of gravity was inspired by those of Pappus and Guido Ubaldo del Monte. Pappus, in his Collections, had defined the center of gravity as a point in a body such that if the body were suspended from it, it would remain at rest. In practice, the center of gravity is the point marking the intersection of all the vertical planes that can be drawn through all the points from which bodies are suspended successively. Guido Ubaldo del Monte, in his Paraphrasis, remarked that the two parts determined by each vertical plane (whatever the point of suspension) were merely “equiponderant,” that is, they had the same effect, but when separated from each other, they would not have the same weight. Galileo converted Guido Ubaldo’s remark into a definition and removed any remaining uncertainties with his concept of moment.

In the second, moment is used to express a product of weight and the velocity of its virtual motion; in this second sense, the concept reflected the dynamic approach of the Mechanical Problems and the works of Jordanus, and thus bears witness to Galileo’s interest in all the traditions that combined in the development of the science of equilibrium. Galileo uses this dynamic version of moment in his analysis of the lever and his theory of the inclined plane through virtual motions.

In the third, particularly in his analysis of the inclined plane, Galileo uses moment to express increases or decreases in the intensity of the tendency with which a heavy body tends to move downward on an inclined plane.

== Synopsis ==
=== On the Utilities That Are Derived from the Mechanical Science and from Its Instruments ===
==== Defining what it means to "cheat" nature and how it remains impossible ====
Galileo begins by emphasizing the usefulness of mechanical instruments, but notes that mechanicians are often misled when applying them to operations that are naturally impossible, such as lifting very heavy loads with only a small force, as though machines could cheat nature. As he points out, nature does not permit us to overcome resistance unless the applied force is sufficient. He then sets out to show not only how machines allow a lesser force to move weights that would otherwise be immovable, but also to illustrate the broader advantages revealed by this study. With this in mind, he notes that there are four things to consider for mechanical motion:

1. the weight to be transferred from one place to another;
2. the force or power that must move the weight;
3. the distance between the beginning and the end of this motion; and
4. the time in which the change must be made (which comes to mean the same as swiftness and speed of its motion, in which to be "swifter" means to pass an equal distance in less time).

Given any determined resistance and delimiting any force, noting any distance in its motion, a weight will be driven by a given force to a given distance. Even if the force is small, we can divide the weight into many pieces, each of which is not superior to the force. By transferring these pieces one at a time, the entire weight can eventually be moved to the desired location. In this fashion, we do not say that the whole weight was translated by a small force, but rather that the small force is applied through many repeated motions and spaces, of which the entire weight only traverses but once.

From this, it appears that the speed of the force is greater than the resistance of the weight by as many times as the weight is greater than the force, since, in the time it takes for the force to repeat the distance, the entire weight passes the distance just once. Thus, what it means to "cheat" nature in mechanics is when a lesser force moves a greater resistance with a speed equal to that which the latter travels, which is impossible for any machine.

==== On the specific usefulness of machines ====
Galileo then lists the specific usefulness of machines, noting that anything beyond is merely deception and impossible undertakings.

The first utility of machines is when it is necessary to move a great weight, as a whole, across a distance using but a small force. Such machines still require the same force to repeat the same space as many times as the weight exceeds it. Thus, at the end of the displacement, the only profit gained from the machine is to have transported the entire weight in one piece with the given force, which, if the weight were divided into pieces, would have been transported without the machine by the same force in the same time through the same distance. Nevertheless, this makes the machine useful since we often need to move great weights in their entirety with less force, albeit at the expense of more time.

The second utility of machines depends on where the operation is carried out. For example, when drawing water from a well, we use a rope and a bucket. With this, we pull a determined quantity of water after a certain period of time with our limited force – it would be wrong to believe that a machine, no matter how complicated, could draw a greater quantity of water with the same force in the same time. However, there are other instruments capable of extracting water, such as bilge pumps used to remove water from ships. Such pumps are not used to transport larger quantities of water in the same time with the same force as would be required of a simple bucket, but rather they are used because the shape of the bucket would otherwise be inconvenient, since it would require a sufficient depth to plunge the bucket into the water in order to draw from it. The same pumps are used in wine cellars where the water can only be removed obliquely, which would otherwise not be possible with a rope and bucket.

The third utility of machines (which, in Galileo's opinion, is the most useful) is that they can be powered by an inanimate force or a cheap animate force in comparison to human power. For example, using the flow of a river to turn a mill, or the strength of a horse, for which several men would not suffice: the power of the river costs little or nothing, and to maintain a horse whose power exceeds that of eight or more men is far cheaper than maintaining and sustaining so many men.

=== Definitions ===
==== Terms of mechanics ====
Galileo then introduces special terms used for his analysis of mechanics, along with their basic assumptions.

Heaviness (gravità) is the tendency of heavy bodies to move downward naturally. In solid bodies, heaviness is caused by the greater or lesser abundance of matter (materia). It is interesting to note that Galileo does not reduce heaviness to weight (peso) or state that it is to be measured by weight.

Moment (momento) is the tendency of heavy bodies to move downward caused not just by the heaviness of the mobile but also by the arrangement that different heavy bodies have among themselves. It is through moment that a less heavy body can be seen to counterbalance another of greater heaviness. For example, on the steelyard balance, a small counterweight can lift a very heavy weight, not through its greater heaviness (of which it lacks) but rather by its distance of suspension of the steelyard. This arrangement, in combination with its heaviness, contributes to its moment and impetus (i.e., drive, propensity, or tendency; not to be confused with Buridanist impetus) to go downward, which may exceed the moment of the other heavier weight. Thus, moment is that impetus to go downward, based on heaviness, position, and anything else that may cause this tendency (Galileo will later show speed to also be a factor when he virtually rotates the lever, as demonstrated in the following Observations section).

At Galileo's time, the word "moment" (momento), which had previously been employed in Latin writings on statics (momentum), was new in its technical sense in Italian literature and would be later criticized for its use in Galileo's work on hydrostatics (Discorso intorno alle cose che stanno in su l'acqua, o che in quella si muovono, "Discourse on Bodies that Stay Atop Water, or Move in It"), to which Galileo would respond by providing a mechanical definition of momento in the second edition of the Discorso, and would further add its technical sense along side the phraseological and metaphorical uses of the term in the second edition of the Crusca Vocabulary of 1623. Galileo's mechanical definition of momento persisted alongside the phraseological and metaphorical definitions in the dictionaries up until the 5th edition, printed in 1910.

Center of Heaviness (centro di gravità) is the point in every heavy body around which parts of equal moments are arranged. Thus, in suspending a body from such a point, the parts to the right balance the parts on the left, the parts to the front balance those of the rear, and those above balance those below. Therefore, the body suspended from said point will not tilt in any direction and remain stable regardless of the body's placement in any location or position. This is the point that would unite itself with the general center of all heavy things, i.e., the center of the Earth, if the body could descend in some free medium.

This definition originated from Federico Commandino. Archimedes also utilized the center of heaviness, but he left the term undefined; however, it is more likely that the definition was provided in an earlier, now lost, work.

==== Suppositions ====
From the above, three suppositions are drawn:

1. All heavy bodies move downward in such a way that their center of heaviness will never depart from the straight line produced from this center to the center of the Earth;
2. Every heavy body is pulled downward principally upon its center of heaviness, and receives there every impetus, heaviness, and moment; and
3. The center of heaviness of two equally heavy bodies is located at the middle of the straight line that connects their respective centers; or, in other words, two equal bodies suspended at equal distances have a point of equilibrium at the common juncture of these equal distances.

==== General guidelines for applying the suppositions ====
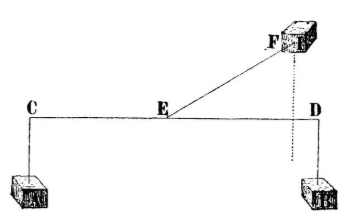
A depiction of Galileo's rule for measuring the effective (horizontal) distances of weights from the fulcrum. Here, weight F is effectively closer to the fulcrum E than weight D, even though the lengths of the lever arm are equal. For equal weights C, D, and F, the weights C and D will attain equilibrium, but the weight F will not, since it is effectively located closer to E than D. Image taken from Antonio Favaro's 1891 edition of Le Opere di Galileo Galilei.

Galileo then notes that the distances between the weights and their fulcrum must be measured with perpendicular lines dropped from their points of suspension down (towards the common center of heavy bodies) upon the straight lines drawn between the centers of heaviness of the two equal weights. For example, on a balance of two equally heavy bodies, noting the straight line drawn between their centers, if one of the balance arms were instead bent upwards from the fulcrum, the weights would no longer balance, since, if we dropped a plumb line from the weight of the bent arm onto the straight line previously drawn, the distance measured from the fulcrum point of the two equally heavy bodies to the intersection with the plumb line would then be shorter as compared to the other side.

==== Galilean law of the lever: the principle of equal moments ====
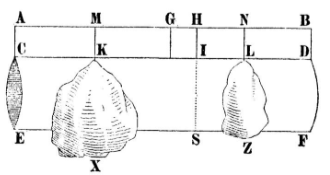
Galileo's geometric proof of the Law of the Lever. The rod CF can be hung and balanced from a string at G. By partitioning the rod along IS, portion CS may be hung at M, and portion FI may be hung at N, maintaining balance with equal moments relative to the fulcrum G. Further, the weight of rods CS and FI can be represented by respective irregular weights X and Z, hung directly above their centers K and L. The ratio of weights located at K and L are in inverse ratio to MG and NG.

Galileo then pivots to an important mechanical principle; unequal weights hanging from unequal distances are balanced whenever the distances are inversely proportional to the weights, which he demonstrates in terms of equal "moments" using a rod of uniform density that is arbitrarily divided into two parts and hung by strings on a balance. Galileo will provide this demonstration again on the Second Day of his Two New Sciences.

=== Some Observations About the Things Said Above ===
==== Virtual displacements and virtual speeds in proportion to moment ====
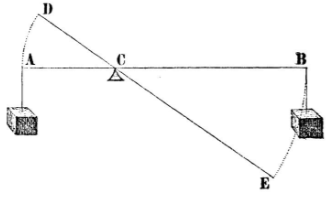
Unequal weights hung at A and B while in static equilibrium are hypothetically given an "insensible" weight that causes the lever AB to rotate to DE, thus producing virtual displacements (or speeds over some time interval) AD and BE.

Having established the case of equal moments of the lever, Galileo notes another "probable" truth. As previously established, if we consider a lever balancing unequal weights at inverse distances (i.e., a state of equal moments), but now one side is hypothetically given a minimal moment of heaviness (i.e., an insensible addition of weight capable of breaking equilibrium), this side will now descend, albeit slowly, while the other side rises. Since any minimal (and insensible) heaviness is sufficient to break equilibrium, we can ignore this quantity so that the power that one weight has in sustaining a second weight compared to the power to move the second weight is essentially indistinguishable. In other words, the additional minimal weight is so small and negligible (yet enough to set the system in motion), the ability of the weights to produce static equilibrium on the lever is also the same ability of the same weights to sustain motion on the lever.

This arrangement forms the basis of mechanical analysis through virtual displacements and virtual speeds (and later, during the analysis of inclined planes, the principle of virtual work). The analysis using virtual speeds was originally drawn from Aristotle.

Now, as one weight descends while the other ascends, the arc lengths traced out by the respective weights (and likewise their speeds, after some interval of time) always remain in the same ratio as the ratio of their distances from the fulcrum. Thus, since the weights are in inverse proportion to their distances, we can also conclude that the weights are also in inverse proportion to their speeds. Therefore, it can be said that the resistance of the heavier weight with its slower speed is compensated by the faster speed of the lighter weight, and vice versa. Galileo then concludes that this line of reasoning shows us that an increase in speed of motion is proportional to an increase in moment.

The concept of momentum, in the modern sense, follows directly from this construction; however, Galileo never completely dissociated his analysis of moment from connected systems.

==== Distances at which heavy bodies come to be weighed ====
Galileo notes that it is important to know how equal and unequal distances are to be understood and measured. For a straight balance having two equal weights at its extremes, equilibrium is found at the midpoint of these extremes because the balance arms have equal lengths. If, however, one of the lever arms is bent at the midpoint, the balance will not be at equilibrium because the effective distance of the weight on the bent arm is less than that of the other. Thus, if we consider the (vertical) lines along which the weights make their impetus and along which they would descend if unrestrained, Galileo instructs that distances measured should not be measured at the point of connection or suspension, but rather the horizontal distance spanning from vertical lines traced from the weight to the point of fulcrum. Moreover, it should be ensured that these lines make right angles at their intersections.

=== Of the Steelyard and of the Lever ===
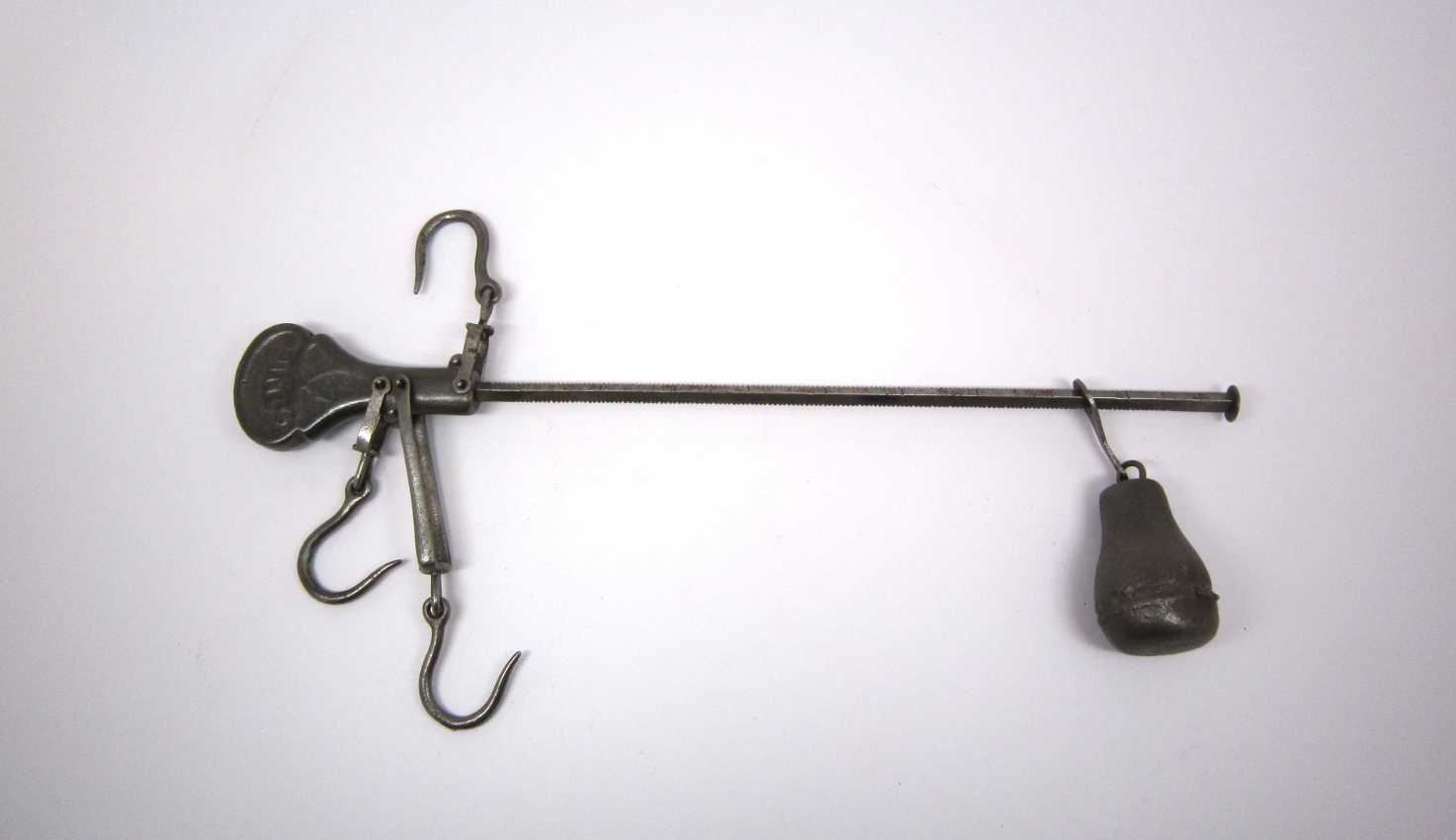
Steelyard weighing device from the late nineteenth century.

Having established these principles, Galileo turns to analyze the steelyard balance, which was a tool used to weigh a heavy weight (primarily merchandise) using a small, movable counterweight along a long lever arm. Once the counterweight finds equilibrium, unequal weights are found to be in inverse ratio to their distances to the fulcrum.

Galileo then notes that the steelyard is no different from a lever, which is used to move large stones and other weights with a small force. He then proceeds to describe how a lever is used, noting that, as the fulcrum is placed ever closer to the weight to be lifted, the force applied at the opposite end is ever less effective at raising the weight (in other words, in using the same force on the same path of motion/displacement, moving the fulcrum closer to the weighted end of the lever raises the weight to ever lesser heights).

He then emphasizes and proves that the utility of the lever is not because the lever is capable in cheating nature by overcoming a large resistance with a small force, but rather in its ability to move, all at once, a heavy body a certain distance, which could be moved otherwise only in pieces by the same force, during the same time, and with an equal motion, without the benefit of the lever.

=== Of the Windlass, and of the Capstan ===
Galileo then analyzes the windlass, which is arranged and moved about a horizontal axis, and the capstan, which worked about a vertical axis; both of which contain wheels that function as continuous levers, and a demonstration in terms of moments is provided. He then also shows how nature is not cheated by these devices, but rather that the lesser force applied to move a greater resistance must travel further than the resisting weight. Galileo then concludes that the advantage of these devices is that the weight is transferred as a whole, but with no less effort, and no greater speed, nor through any greater distance than that of the same force that would otherwise transfer the weight piece by piece.

=== Of Pulleys ===
Galileo asserts that pulleys (i.e., block-and-tackle systems and simple pulleys) are also describable as a lever; however, prior to demonstrating pulleys, he first demonstrates class II levers (prior analysis of levers up until this section were class I levers). Again, Galileo demonstrates the class II lever in terms of moment, and shows that whatever is gained in force is lost in speed.

In viewing a single fixed pulley system with a rope hanging about it vertically on both sides of the pulley, Galileo notes that the wheel of the pulley is essentially a lever with equal arms, which amounts to no mechanical advantage. He further notes that Aristotle "childishly deceived himself" into believing that larger pulley wheels provided a greater advantage than smaller pulley wheels. Instead, Galileo asserts that the only advantage that these simple pulleys offer is the convenience of not having to fight against our own bodies when lifting a weight: in lifting a weight with our arms, we must lift the weight itself along with the weight of our own arms; in contrast, the simple pulley allows us to use the weight of our own arms to pull the rope downwards. Thus, the advantage of simple pulleys is not in its mechanical advantage, but rather in the mode of applying it.

In a single movable pulley system in which one end of the rope is anchored, the weight to be lifted is coupled to the housing of the pulley, and the other end of the rope is pulled, thus lifting the pulley housing along with the weight (the system described here is shown to be analogous to the class II lever), a mechanical advantage is certainly observed since the effort is equally divided between the force pulling and the anchored end.

However, the single movable pulley system requires a direction of force that is inconvenient for inanimate movers, or at least more laborious for animate movers. To overcome this inconvenience a single fixed pulley is added to the system, to which the rope is anchored to, thus forming a block-and-tackle system (more specifically, a gun tackle system). The mechanical advantage can be further increased by adding movable and fixed pulleys to the system, which Galileo demonstrates in terms of moments.

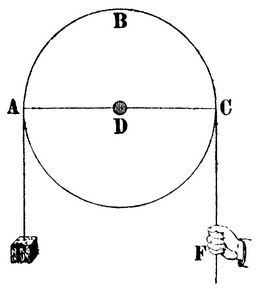
A simple pulley ABC in which a weight E is lifted by a force F.

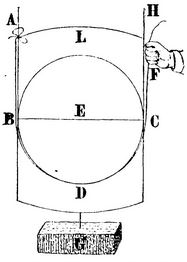
A single movable pulley BDC supports a weight G. A cord ABDCF wrapped around pulley BDC is anchored at A, and a force applied at F pulls upwards, thus raising pulley BDC and the weight G, functioning as a class II lever.

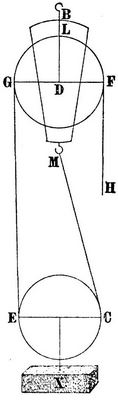
A "gun tackle" system of pulleys. Here, cord HFGECM wraps around a simple pulley FG and a movable pulley EC, with cord end M anchored to pulley FG. In this arrangement, applying a force at H raises pulley EC and the weight X, functioning as a class II lever.

=== Of the Screw ===
Galileo then turns to the screw, which he believes is the most ingenious and useful invention of all the mechanical instruments, since it not only moves but also fixes and presses with great force, compactly supplying the ability of a large machine into a small device. Before diving into the discussion of the screw, Galileo shifts the focus to another theorem, which serves as a principal foundation for analyzing the screw: inertia.

==== The principle of inertia and the various impetuses observed on different inclined planes ====
Galileo notes that all heavy bodies have a propensity, when free, to move towards the center of the Earth in a straight line. However, when obstructed by any other line tilted towards the center of the Earth, heavy bodies will still go downward, albeit more slowly. For instance, water runs on the surface of the Earth on lines that are inclined, as is seen with rivers, even though the incline of the river bed is only but barely inclined.

Solids also behave the same way, provided that their shapes and other external impediments do not prevent their motion. Thus, if we have a smooth and polished surface, such as a mirror, and we place a smooth and round ball of marble, glass, or some other polishable material on this polished surface, the ball will move, provided that the surface has at least a slight tilt; however, if the surface is perfectly leveled, equidistant from the plane of the horizon, then the ball will remain still. For example, a ball will stand still on a frozen lake or pond, which would otherwise move by an extremely small force. Should the plane that the ball rests upon be tilted just ever so slightly, the ball would spontaneously move towards the lower end of the plane, and likewise, the ball would have resistance in motion toward the upper end of the plane. Thus, it's clear that a ball placed on an exactly horizontal surface would remain indifferent between motion and rest, such that any minimal force would be sufficient to move it, just as any minimal resistance, such as the air that surrounds it, would be capable of holding it still.

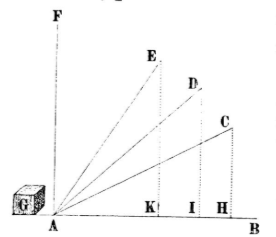
Various inclinations of the plane of the same length for raising a weight G.

From this, Galileo concludes that we have an axiom: with all external impediments removed, heavy bodies can be moved on the horizontal plane by any minimal force. If the same heavy body must be driven up a plane, it would require greater forces for greater vertical elevations of the same plane (i.e., greater heights for greater inclinations, by rotation, of the same plane). He then provides a diagram illustrating various inclinations of the same length of plane, showing that a heavy body has a greater impetus to go downward along steeper inclines, which conversely requires a greater force to push it up the plane – the greatest resistance to motion being along the vertical; however, along the horizontal, the heavy body remains indifferent to motion or rest, being movable by any minimal force.

==== The ratio of forces along the inclined plane against its vertical: a bent lever analogy ====
From the above, Galileo presents the question: what proportion should a force have to a weight in order to push it up along different inclined planes? To this, Galileo sets out to demonstrate that the same weight upon an incline will be moved upwards by a weaker force than along a vertical distance in proportion to the vertical elevation of the incline to the inclined length of the plane.

Much of the following construction mimics the same shown in a chapter of Galileo's earlier work De Motu; however, this time, Galileo avoids any mention of the ratio of speeds.

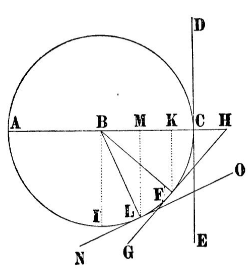
A lever AC is inscribed in the circle ABC, which is set tangent to various inclinations NO, GH, and the vertical DE. The "total" moment of a weight is obtained when the lever arm BC is aligned with AB, which is the same moment of a weight when positioned on the vertical DE. The "partial" moment of the weight is obtained when the lever arm is bent (relative to AB) along either BF or BL; thus, weights placed at L and F must be proportionally larger to counterbalance a weight placed at A. The moment of weights placed at F or L are the same as if the weights were placed on respective inclinations GH or NO. If the lever is bent to BI, then the weight at I has no moment and is incapable of balancing any non-zero weight placed at A.

Galileo begins by stating that the theory he presents was originally attempted by Pappus of Alexandria in the eighth book of his Mathematical Collections; however, he argues that Pappus failed because he assumed that heavy bodies require an applied force in order to be moved along the horizontal, which Galileo asserts is false.

In his construction, Galileo relies on a "bent lever" analogy for analyzing the inclined plane. As the bent lever suspending a weight is turned downward, its moment and its impetus to go down decrease as the lever increases its support of the weight along its radius. He then argues that this arrangement would be no different if the weight were instead placed on a circular surface such that the surface supports the weight instead of the radius of the lever – in both cases, the constrained path of the weight is the same. Thus, when the lever is straight (i.e., not bent), the weight exerts its maximum moment and would behave no differently if placed, unsuspended, against a vertical surface. If the lever is bent downward slightly, then the weight is partly sustained by the radius of the lever, or equivalently, partly sustained by the curved surface beneath it, with its moment only partially exerted. Therefore, if the weight were to start its motion at the bent lever position, it would be as if the weight were on an inclined plane whose slope is the same as the tangent line of the circle at that position.

Through this arrangement, Galileo is able to geometrically find (via similar trianlges) the ratio of moments of a weight on an inclined plane: the ratio of total moment of the weight on the vertical to the partial moment of the same weight supported on the inclined plane is the same as the ratio of the length of the incline of the plane to the vertical elevation of the plane. Moreover, to sustain the weight along the vertical, the sustaining force must be equal to the weight; and to sustain the weight along the incline, the sustaining force must be proportionately less, just as the vertical elevation is less than the length of the incline. Galileo then concludes: since, in general, the force to move a weight only needs to insensibly exceed what is needed to sustain it, then the force along the inclined plane has the same proportion to the weight as the vertical elevation to the length of the incline of the plane, such that the force is sufficient to sustain the weight on the inclined plane and is also the minimum force sufficient to push the weight up along the inclined plane, thus answering the posed initial question.

In this arrangement, by reducing the analysis of force on the inclined plane to the vertical component, Galileo utilizes the principle of virtual velocities. Moreover, his previous reduction of circular to tangential motions, along with the insensible force in his analysis, introduces in effect the use of infinitesimal displacements in place of gross motions.

==== Returning to the screw ====
Galileo observes that a weight being drawn up an inclined plane along a motionless plane is the same as if the weight were moved vertically while the inclined plane translates horizontally (essentially acting as a wedge). With this translating inclined plane in mind, Galileo asserts that the screw is just an inclined plane wrapped around a cylinder to form a thread, thus making the screw a compact version of the inclined plane.

Having previously demonstrated that the force acting on a weight placed on an incline to the force of the same weight placed along the vertical has the same proportion as the vertical elevation of the incline to the length of the incline, it can be seen that the force is multiplied by the screw according to the ratio of the length of the thread to its height. Thus, by having more threads within the same height of the screw, the more powerful the vertical pressing force becomes.

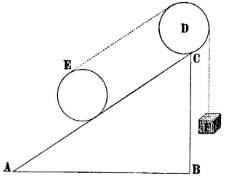
On the inclined plane ABC, weight E and counterweight F are inextensibly connected by cord EDF, the cord passing around pulley D. If the ratio of the counterweight F to weight E is the same as BC to AC, then the weights will have static equilibrium. However, if, hypothetically, the system were to move such that the counterweight F descends and weight E ascends, then the vertical displacements (or speeds) of the counterweight F to those of weight E are in ratio of AC to BC, or as the weight E to the counterweight F.

Lastly, Galileo reminds us of the principle that applies to all mechanical instruments: whatever is gained in force is lost in time and speed. He demonstrates this principle with the screw, using an example of a weight raised on an inclined plane.

Consider a weight placed on an inclined plane, and connected to the weight via an inextensible cord is a counterweight that hangs vertically over the edge of the plane. If the proportion of the force produced by the counterweight on the vertical to the weight on the incline is the same as the vertical elevation of the plane to the inclined length (here, Galileo is applying the ratio found in the previous section to construct an equilibrium condition for the two weights such that the reduced force of the weight on the inclined plane, which is now determinable from the ratio, is canceled by the equivalent opposing force of the counterweight; as described earlier, this arrangement is reducible to the bent lever analogy in which the counterweight is on one side of a lever while the other, heavier weight is on the bent side, such that the ratio of weights are inverse ratio to their horizontal distances from the fulcrum), and if these coupled weights were permitted to move (perhaps by the addition of some insensible weight), then, by virtue of the connecting cord, the hanging counterweight will traverse a space that is equal to the space traversed by the other weight up the inclined plane.

In this arrangement, the space traversed by the weight along the entire length of the inclined plane corresponds to a vertical displacement equal to that of the vertical elevation of the plane, while with the same motion, the hanging counterweight must descend vertically the same distance as the entire length of the inclined portion of the plane. Since heavy bodies do not offer resistance to motion except when displaced away from the center of the Earth (this being the basis of the principle of virtual work within the context of Galileo's limited inertial principle), then from the construction we may say that the travel of the force of the hanging counterweight has the same ratio to the travel of the force of the weight on the incline as the length of the inclined plane has to the vertical elevation of the inclined plane, or as the weight has to the counterweight.

This demonstration is revisited in the second edition of Galileo's Two New Sciences, in which Vincenzo Viviani, under the direction of Galileo, includes an appended scholium just after the second theorem of accelerated motion (and its corollaries) of the Third day; however, the discussion omits the bent lever analysis.

==== Of the Archimedean screw for raising water ====
Galileo comments that the Archimedean screw is "not only marvelous, but miraculous" since the water ascends within a continually descending screw. He then explains its function along with the required angles for its operation.

=== Of the Force of Percussion ===
Galileo remarks that there is something curious about the force of percussion as compared to all the other mechanical instruments: when a nail is struck into a piece of wood, or a stick driven into the ground, both rely on the force of percussion of a hammer, which would otherwise not be possible if the hammer, or even a heavier weight, were simply placed on them. To this, Galileo believes that no one else before has sufficiently explained its reason – even Aristotle and several others attempted to do so, attributing the cause to the length of the handle of the hammer, but such attempts remained flawed, for even without the handle, a weight falling from a height may perform the same action.

Galileo indicates that the force, the resistance, and the space through which the motion is performed follow in the same proportion as the other mechanical operations, and obey those laws by which a resistance equal to the force is moved by this force through an equal space and with equal speed to that of the mover.

From there, Galileo provides some groundwork for the study of percussion. However, he admits there are difficulties and objections to it, but he assures that these will be resolved once the mechanical problems appended at the end are further studied. Unfortunately, these mechanical problems are lost.

Galileo later mentions various cases of the force of percussion again throughout his Two New Sciences, and even intended to include a Fifth or Sixth Day dedicated to the force of percussion, but was not able to complete it to his own satisfaction.
