= Galileo's paradox =

Paradox in set theory

Galileo's paradox is a demonstration of one of the surprising properties of infinite sets. In his final scientific work, Two New Sciences, Galileo Galilei made apparently contradictory statements about the positive integers. First, a square is an integer which is the square of an integer. Some numbers are squares, while others are not; therefore, all the numbers, including both squares and non-squares, must be more numerous than just the squares. And yet, for every number there is exactly one square; hence, there cannot be more of one than of the other. This is an early use, though not the first, of the idea of one-to-one correspondence in the context of infinite sets.

Galileo concluded that the ideas of less, equal, and greater apply to finite quantities but not to infinite quantities. During the nineteenth century Cantor found a framework in which this restriction is not necessary; it is possible to define comparisons amongst infinite sets in a meaningful way (by which definition the two sets, integers and squares, have "the same size"), and that by this definition some infinite sets are strictly larger than others.

The ideas were not new with Galileo, but his name has come to be associated with them. In particular, Duns Scotus, about 1302, compared even numbers to the whole of numbers.

== Galileo on infinite sets ==
The relevant section of Two New Sciences is excerpted below:

Simplicio: Here a difficulty presents itself which appears to me insoluble. Since it is clear that we may have one line greater than another, each containing an infinite number of points, we are forced to admit that, within one and the same class, we may have something greater than infinity, because the infinity of points in the long line is greater than the infinity of points in the short line. This assigning to an infinite quantity a value greater than infinity is quite beyond my comprehension.

Salviati: This is one of the difficulties which arise when we attempt, with our finite minds, to discuss the infinite, assigning to it those properties which we give to the finite and limited; but this I think is wrong, for we cannot speak of infinite quantities as being the one greater or less than or equal to another. To prove this I have in mind an argument which, for the sake of clearness, I shall put in the form of questions to Simplicio who raised this difficulty.

I take it for granted that you know which of the numbers are squares and which are not.

Simplicio: I am quite aware that a squared number is one which results from the multiplication of another number by itself; thus 4, 9, etc., are squared numbers which come from multiplying 2, 3, etc., by themselves.

Salviati: Very well; and you also know that just as the products are called squares so the factors are called sides or roots; while on the other hand those numbers which do not consist of two equal factors are not squares. Therefore if I assert that all numbers, including both squares and non-squares, are more than the squares alone, I shall speak the truth, shall I not?

Simplicio: Most certainly.

Salviati: If I should ask further how many squares there are one might reply truly that there are as many as the corresponding number of roots, since every square has its own root and every root its own square, while no square has more than one root and no root more than one square.

Simplicio: Precisely so.

Salviati: But if I inquire how many roots there are, it cannot be denied that there are as many as the numbers because every number is the root of some square. This being granted, we must say that there are as many squares as there are numbers because they are just as numerous as their roots, and all the numbers are roots. Yet at the outset we said that there are many more numbers than squares, since the larger portion of them are not squares. Not only so, but the proportionate number of squares diminishes as we pass to larger numbers, Thus up to 100 we have 10 squares, that is, the squares constitute 1/10 part of all the numbers; up to 10000, we find only 1/100 part to be squares; and up to a million only 1/1000 part; on the other hand in an infinite number, if one could conceive of such a thing, he would be forced to admit that there are as many squares as there are numbers taken all together.

Sagredo: What then must one conclude under these circumstances?

Salviati: So far as I see we can only infer that the totality of all numbers is infinite, that the number of squares is infinite, and that the number of their roots is infinite; neither is the number of squares less than the totality of all the numbers, nor the latter greater than the former; and finally the attributes "equal", "greater", and "less", are not applicable to infinite, but only to finite, quantities. When therefore Simplicio introduces several lines of different lengths and asks me how it is possible that the longer ones do not contain more points than the shorter, I answer him that one line does not contain more or less or just as many points as another, but that each line contains an infinite number.

— Galileo, Two New Sciences

== See also ==
- Dedekind-infinite set
- Hilbert's paradox of the Grand Hotel
