= Israel Edward Drabkin =

American classicist and historian (1905–1965)

Israel E. Drabkin (February 7, 1905 – March 27, 1965) was an American classicist and historian of science, medicine, and mathematics. He spent much of his career at the City College of New York. He is known for his studies of Caelius Aurelianus and Galileo.

== Biography ==
Drabkin was born in Jersey City on 7 February 1905, the son of Harry H. Drabkin and Bessie (Glass) Drabkin. He attended City College, graduating with a Bachelor of Arts degree in 1924. In 1923, he began teaching Greek and Latin at Townsend Harris Hall, the preparatory school affiliated with City College, a post he held until the closing of the school in 1942. During this time he completed graduate studies at Columbia University, earning a Master of Arts in 1926 and a Ph.D. in 1930 with a dissertation on the Copa.

In 1932, Drabkin married classicist and Columbia graduate Norma Loewenstein, who eventually became professor in the classics department at Brooklyn College. She died in 1938 at age 31. With Morris Raphael Cohen he edited A Sourcebook in Greek Science, a compilation, with commentary, for which Drabkin did many of the translations. This work was not published until much later. From 1941 to 1943, Drabkin was a Carnegie Fellow in Greek and Roman History at the Institute of the History of Medicine at Johns Hopkins University, which, at that time, was directed by Henry E. Sigerist. It was during this period that he produced his translation and commentary on Caelius Aurelianus' On Acute and Chronic Diseases. In 1941 he married the classicist and medical historian Miriam Friedman, who went on to have a long career at City College. They had two children, Susan and William.

During the Second World War Drabkin served as a mathematics instructor in the Army Specialized Training Program. Following the closure of Townsend Harris Hall, he taught mathematics at City College. In the late 1940s, Drabkin noticed an entry in a Swiss manuscript dealer's catalog that he identified as a 13th-century copy of Caelius Aurelianus' Gynaecia, a roughly 5th century Latin translation of a 2nd-century Greek work on gynecology, obstetrics, and diseases of women by Soranus of Ephesus, which, while widely used during the Middle Ages, was long believed lost. Together with Miriam Friedman Drabkin, he edited the work for publication.

In 1953, Drabkin was appointed associate professor in the classics department at City College, and attained the rank of professor in 1957. He served as chairman of the classics department from 1957 until his death. With Stillman Drake, he produced two books on Renaissance science, On Motion and Mechanics, which contained Drabkin's translation of Galileo's De Motu, and Mechanics in 16th Century Italy.

Drabkin received a number of honors for his scholarly work. In 1945 and 1946, he was a Guggenheim fellow. In 1951, he was the Fielding H. Garrison Lecturer at the American Association for the History of Medicine annual meeting, where he presented the lecture "Soranus and His System of Medicine". At various times he held visiting positions at the University of Chicago, the Institute for Advanced Study in Princeton, and Harvard. He died on 27 March 1965 in Hackensack, New Jersey.
