= Girolamo Borro =

Italian philosopher and professor

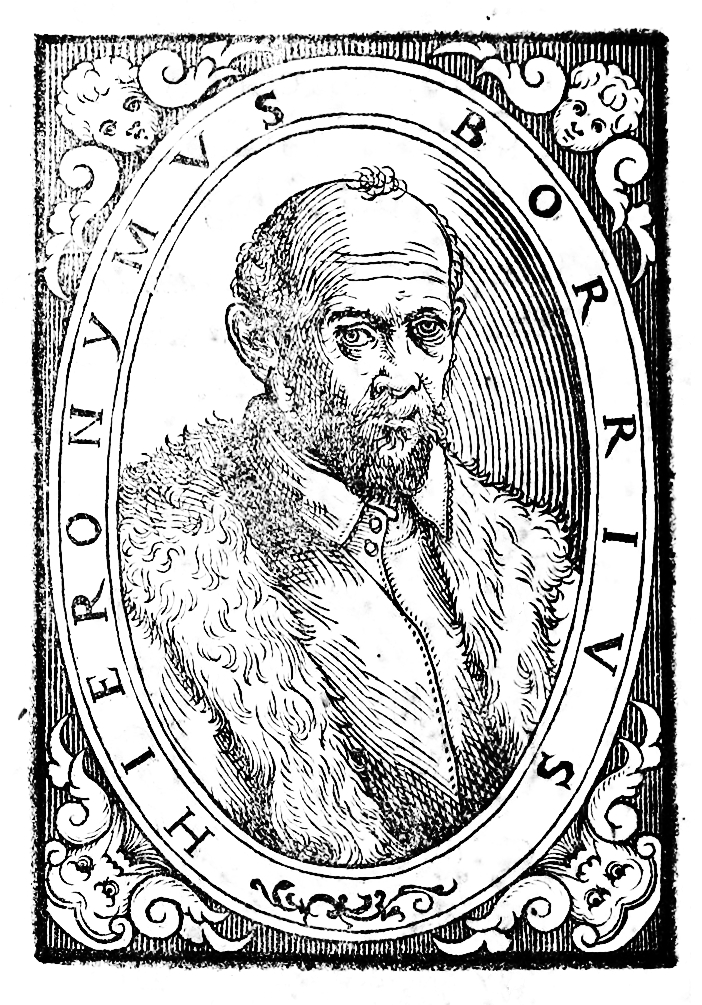

Girolamo Borro (1512 – 26 August 1592) latinized as Hieronomyus Borrius was an Italian philosopher and a professor at the University of Pisa. He belonged to a group of natural philosophers who rejected appeals to the supernatural and occult to explain phenomena. He is thought to have influenced Galileo and Borro's ideas were published in dialogue form in a book on tides Dialogo del flusso e reflusso del mare (1561). Another book by Borro was on moving bodies, De motu gravium et levium (1575). He also authored some manuscripts including Multae sunt nostrarum ignorationum causae.

Borro was born in Arezzo to Mariano and was educated at Padua. A patron of his was Cardinal Giovanni Salviati and after his death he held a chair in philosophy at Pisa with colleagues like Selvaggio Ghettini. Like several other Tuscan philosophers of the period including Andrea Cesalpino and Francesco Buonamici he rejected the use of theology to explain natural phenomena. He was brought into the heresy trial of Pietro Carnesecchi in 1567 and during the Roman inquisition of 1582 but was cleared by influence from Pope Gregory XIII. He taught philosophy at the University of Pisa during Galileo's student days. Two of the books that Borro wrote were in Galileo's library and may have influenced his writings, as there is an explicit citation to Borro's 1575 book. Borro himself drew his ideas from Greek and Arab thinkers and did not cite any theological writings. He claimed that God was only involved in conceiving and loving himself and not bothered by earthly or human matters. His explanation of the tides was based on the idea that the moon heated and caused an expansion of the water. He also emphasized the use of experiments in addition to experience as methods for gaining knowledge. He used the phrase "periculum facere" for his trials such as those that involved simultaneously dropping a piece of wood and an equal weight of lead from a height to examine which fell first. Borro died in Perugia.
