= Francesco Buonamici (philosopher) =

Italian philosopher (1533–1603)

Francesco Buonamici (1533 – 29 September 1603) was an Italian philosopher, professor at the University of Pisa and writer who wrote about his ideas on motion in a treatise called De Motu. He was one of the teachers of Galileo.

Buonamici was born in Florence where his father was a notary. He studied at the University of Pisa where his teachers included Pier Vettori and Ciriaco Strozzi. He read classical Greek texts including the works of Aristotle and became a teacher of philosophy at the University of Pisa in 1565 and a full professor in 1571. He taught natural philosophy based on Aristotle and in 1598, he succeeded Francesco Piccolomini at the University of Padua. Buonamici was a contemporary of Girolamo Borro who also interpreted Aristotle but took a different opposing view on matters. Buonamici did not accept that elements were intermediate forms of substances, and like Aristotelians he believed that the dynamics of motion were related to composition. Buonamici wrote on food and nutrition in a 1603 book De alimenti essentia which covered human growth. Galileo Galilei studied under Buonamici and referred to his works. Buonamici, in his treatise, examined cosmology, movement and his version of God was an entity that eternally contemplated itself without relation to human events.
