= Two New Sciences =

1638 book by Galileo Galilei

Discourses and Mathematical Demonstrations Relating to Two New Sciences
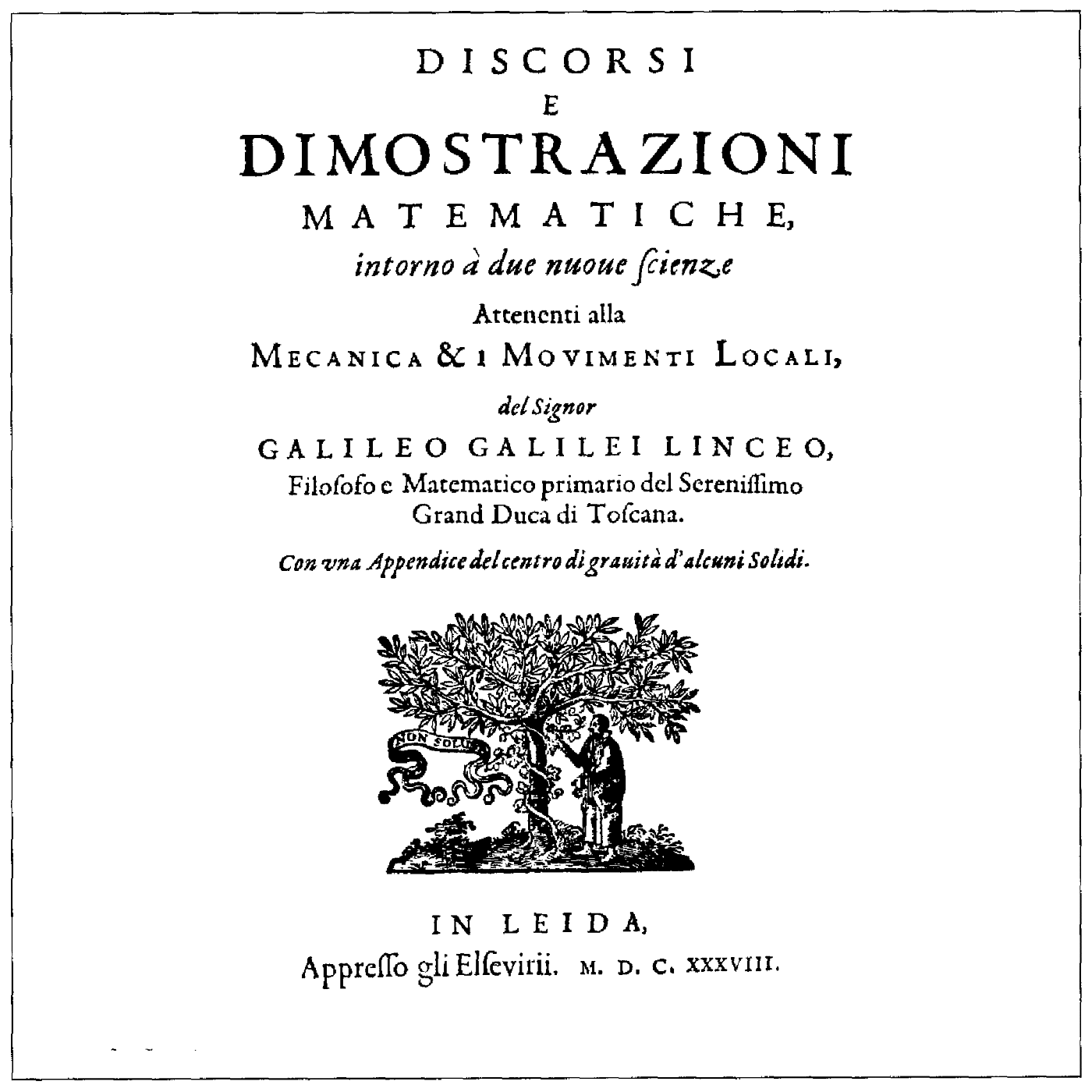
- Author: Galileo Galilei
- Original title: Discorsi e dimostrazioni matematiche intorno a due nuove scienze
- Subject: Astronomy
- Published: 1638
- Publisher: Lodewijk Elzevir
- Publication place: Leiden, Dutch Republic

The Discourses and Mathematical Demonstrations Relating to Two New Sciences (Italian: Discorsi e dimostrazioni matematiche intorno a due nuove scienze pronounced [diˈskorsi e ddimostratˈtsjoːni mateˈmaːtike inˈtorno a dˈduːe ˈnwɔːve ʃˈʃɛntse]) published in 1638 was Galileo Galilei's final book and a scientific testament covering much of his work in physics over the preceding thirty years. It was written partly in Italian and partly in Latin.

After his Dialogue Concerning the Two Chief World Systems, the Roman Inquisition had banned the publication of any of Galileo's works, including any he might write in the future. After the failure of his initial attempts to publish Two New Sciences in France, Germany, and Poland, it was published by Lodewijk Elzevir who was working in Leiden, South Holland, where the writ of the Inquisition was of less consequence (see House of Elzevir). Fra Fulgenzio Micanzio, the official theologian of the Republic of Venice, had initially offered to help Galileo publish the new work there, but he pointed out that publishing the Two New Sciences in Venice might cause Galileo unnecessary trouble; thus, the book was eventually published in Holland. Galileo did not seem to suffer any harm from the Inquisition for publishing this book since in January 1639, the book reached Rome's bookstores, and all available copies (about fifty) were quickly sold.

Discourses was written in a style similar to Dialogues, in which three men (Simplicio, Sagredo, and Salviati) discuss and debate the various questions Galileo is seeking to answer. There is a notable change in the men, however; Simplicio, in particular, is no longer quite as simple-minded, stubborn and Aristotelian as his name implies. His arguments are representative of Galileo's own early beliefs, as Sagredo represents his middle period, and Salviati proposes Galileo's newest models.

== Introduction ==
The book is divided into four days, each addressing different areas of physics. Galileo dedicates Two New Sciences to Lord Count of Noailles.

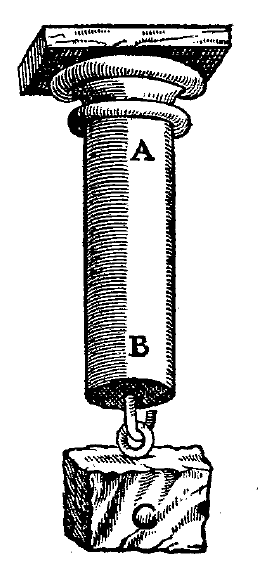
Figure 1 out of Galileo's Two New Sciences in the First Day section

In the First Day, Galileo addressed topics that were discussed in Aristotle's Physics and the Aristotelian school's Mechanics. It also provides an introduction to the discussion of both of the new sciences. The likeness between the topics discussed, specific questions that are hypothesized, and the style and sources throughout give Galileo the backbone to his First Day. The First Day introduces the speakers in the dialogue: Salviati, Sagredo, and Simplicio, the same as in the Dialogue. These three people are all Galileo just at different stages of his life, Simplicio the youngest and Salviati, Galileo's closest counterpart. The Second Day addresses the question of the strength of materials.

The Third and Fourth days address the science of motion. The Third day discusses uniform and naturally accelerated motion, the issue of terminal velocity having been addressed in the First day. The Fourth day discusses projectile motion.

In Two Sciences uniform motion is defined as a motion that, over any equal periods of time, covers equal distance. With the use of the quantifier ″any″, uniformity is introduced and expressed more explicitly than in previous definitions.

Galileo had started an additional day on the force of percussion, but was not able to complete it to his own satisfaction. This section was referenced frequently in the first four days of discussion. It finally appeared only in the 1718 edition of Galilei's works. and it is often quoted as "Sixth Day" following the numbering in the 1898 edition. During this additional day Simplicio was replaced by Aproino, a former scholar and assistant of Galileo in Padua.

== Summary ==
Page numbers at the start of each paragraph are from the 1898 version, presently adopted as standard, and are found in the Crew and Drake translations.

=== Day one: Resistance of bodies to separation ===
[50] Preliminary discussions. Sagredo (taken to be the younger Galileo) cannot understand why with machines one cannot argue from the small to the large: "I do not see that the properties of circles, triangles and...solid figures should change with their size". Salviati (speaking for Galileo) says the common opinion is wrong. Scale matters: a horse falling from a height of 3 or 4 cubits will break its bones whereas a cat falling from twice the height won't, nor will a grasshopper falling from a tower.

[56] The first example is a hemp rope which is constructed from small fibres which bind together in the same way as a rope round a windlass to produce something much stronger. Then the vacuum that prevents two highly polished plates from separating even though they slide easily gives rise to an experiment to test whether water can be expanded or whether a vacuum is caused. In fact, Sagredo had observed that a suction pump could not lift more than 18 cubits of water and Salviati observes that the weight of this is the amount of resistance to a void. The discussion turns to the strength of a copper wire and whether there are minute void spaces inside the metal or whether there is some other explanation for its strength.

[68] This leads into a discussion of infinites and the continuum and thence to the observation that the number of squares equal the number of roots. He comes eventually to the view that "if any number can be said to be infinite, it must be unity" and demonstrates a construction in which an infinite circle is approached and another to divide a line.

[85] The difference between a fine dust and a liquid leads to a discussion of light and how the concentrated power of the sun can melt metals. He deduces that light has motion and describes an (unsuccessful) attempt to measure its speed.

[106] Aristotle believed that bodies fell at a speed proportional to weight but Salviati doubts that Aristotle ever tested this. He also did not believe that motion in a void was possible, but since air is much less dense than water Salviati asserts that in a medium devoid of resistance (a vacuum) all bodies—a lock of wool or a bit of lead—would fall at the same speed. Large and small bodies fall at the same speed through air or water providing they are of the same density. Since ebony weighs a thousand times as much as air (which he had measured), it will fall only a very little more slowly than lead which weighs ten times as much. But shape also matters—even a piece of gold leaf (the densest of all substances [asserts Salviati]) floats through the air and a bladder filled with air falls much more slowly than lead.

[128] Measuring the speed of a fall is difficult because of the small time intervals involved and his first way round this used pendulums of the same length but with lead or cork weights. The period of oscillation was the same, even when the cork was swung more widely to compensate for the fact that it soon stopped.

[139] This leads to a discussion of the vibration of strings and he suggests that not only the length of the string is important for pitch but also the tension and the weight of the string.

=== Day two: Cause of cohesion ===
[151] Salviati proves that a balance can be used not only with equal arms but with unequal arms with weights inversely proportional to the distances from the fulcrum. Following this he shows that the moment of a weight suspended by a beam supported at one end is proportional to the square of the length. The resistance to fracture of beams of various sizes and thicknesses is demonstrated, supported at one or both ends.

[169] He shows that animal bones have to be proportionately larger for larger animals and the length of a cylinder that will break under its own weight. He proves that the best place to break a stick placed upon the knee is the middle and shows how far along a beam that a larger weight can be placed without breaking it.

[178] He proves that the optimum shape for a beam supported at one end and bearing a load at the other is parabolic. He also shows that hollow cylinders are stronger than solid ones of the same weight.

=== Day three: Naturally accelerated motion ===
[191] He first defines uniform (steady) motion and shows the relationship between speed, time and distance. He then defines uniformly accelerated motion where the speed increases by the same amount in increments of time. Falling bodies start very slowly and he sets out to show that their velocity increases in simple proportionality to time, not to distance which he shows is impossible.

[208] He shows that the distance travelled in naturally accelerated motion is proportional to the square of the time. He describes an experiment in which a steel ball was rolled down a groove in a piece of wooden moulding 12 cubits long (about 5.5m) with one end raised by one or two cubits. This was repeated, measuring times by accurately weighing the amount of water that came out of a thin pipe in a jet from the bottom of a large jug of water. By this means he was able to verify the uniformly accelerated motion. He then shows that whatever the inclination of the plane, the square of the time taken to fall a given vertical height is proportional to the inclined distance.

[221] He next considers descent along the chords of a circle, showing that the time is the same as that falling from the vertex, and various other combinations of planes. He gives an erroneous solution to the brachistochrone problem, claiming to prove that the arc of the circle is the fastest descent. 16 problems with solutions are given.

=== Day four: The motion of projectiles ===
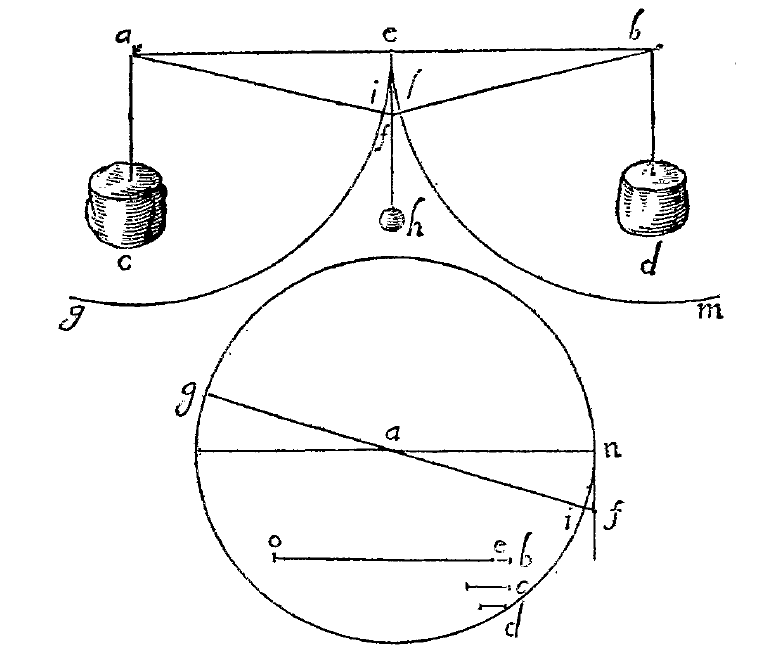
Last figure of the Fourth Day of Galileo's Two New Sciences

[268] The motion of projectiles consists of a combination of uniform horizontal motion and a naturally accelerated vertical motion which produces a parabolic curve. Two motions at right angles can be calculated using the sum of the squares. He shows in detail how to construct the parabolas in various situations and gives tables for altitude and range depending on the projected angle.

[274] Air resistance shows itself in two ways: by affecting less dense bodies more and by offering greater resistance to faster bodies. A lead ball will fall slightly faster than an oak ball, but the difference with a stone ball is negligible. However the speed does not go on increasing indefinitely but reaches a maximum. Though at small speeds the effect of air resistance is small, it is greater when considering, say, a ball fired from a cannon.

[292] The effect of a projectile hitting a target is reduced if the target is free to move. The velocity of a moving body can overcome that of a larger body if its speed is proportionately greater than the resistance.

[310] A cord or chain stretched out is never level but also approximates to a parabola. (But see also catenary.)

=== Additional day: The force of percussion ===
[323] What is the weight of water falling from a bucket hanging on a balance arm onto another bucket suspended to the same arm?

[325] Piling of wooden poles for foundations; hammers and the force of percussion.

[336] Speed of fall along inclined planes; again on the principle of inertia.

== Methodology ==
Many contemporary scientists, such as Gassendi, dispute Galileo's methodology for conceptualizing his law of falling bodies. Two of the main arguments are that his epistemology followed the example of Platonist thought or hypothetico-deductivist. It has now been considered to be ex suppositione, or knowing the how and why effects from past events in order to determine the requirements for the production of similar effects in the future. Galilean methodology mirrored that of Aristotelian and Archimedean epistemology. Following a letter from Cardinal Bellarmine in 1615 Galileo distinguished his arguments and Copernicus' as natural suppositions as opposed to the "fictive" that are "introduced only for the sake of astronomical computations," such as Ptolemy's hypothesis on eccentrics and equants.

Galileo's earlier writing considered Juvenilia, or youthful writings, are considered his first attempts at creating lecture notes for his course "hypothesis of the celestial motions" while teaching in at the University of Padua. These notes mirrored those of his contemporaries at the Collegio as well as contained an "Aristotelian context with decided Thomistic (St. Thomas Aquinas) overtones." These earlier papers are believed to have encouraged him to apply demonstrative proof in order to give validity to his discoveries on motion.

Discovery of folio 116v gives evidence of experiments that had previously not been reported and therefore demonstrated Galileo's actual calculations for the Law of Falling Bodies.

His methods of experimentation have been proved by the recording and recreation done by scientists such as James MacLachlan, Stillman Drake, R.H. Taylor and others in order to prove he did not merely imagine his ideas as historian Alexandre Koyré argued, but sought to prove them mathematically.

Galileo believed that knowledge could be acquired through reason, and reinforced through observation and experimentation. Thus, it can be argued that Galileo was a rationalist, and also that he was an empiricist.

== The two new sciences ==
The two sciences mentioned in the title are the strength of materials and the motion of objects (the forebears of modern material engineering and kinematics). In the title of the book "mechanics" and "motion" are separate, since at Galileo's time "mechanics" meant only statics and strength of materials.

=== The science of materials ===
The discussion begins with a demonstration of the reasons that a large structure proportioned in exactly the same way as a smaller one must necessarily be weaker known as the square–cube law. Later in the discussion this principle is applied to the thickness required of the bones of a large animal, possibly the first quantitative result in biology, anticipating J. B. S. Haldane's work On Being the Right Size, and other essays, edited by John Maynard Smith.

=== The motion of objects ===
Galileo expresses clearly for the first time the constant acceleration of a falling body which he was able to measure accurately by slowing it down using an inclined plane.

In Two New Sciences, Galileo (Salviati speaks for him) used a wood molding, "12 cubits long, half a cubit wide and three finger-breadths thick" as a ramp with a straight, smooth, polished groove to study rolling balls ("a hard, smooth and very round bronze ball"). He lined the groove with "parchment, also smooth and polished as possible". He inclined the ramp at various angles, effectively slowing down the acceleration enough so that he could measure the elapsed time. He would let the ball roll a known distance down the ramp, and use a water clock to measure the time taken to move the known distance. This clock was

a large vessel of water placed in an elevated position; to the bottom of this vessel was soldered a pipe of small diameter giving a thin jet of water, which we collected in a small glass during the time of each descent, whether for the whole length of the channel or for a part of its length. The water collected was weighed, and after each descent on a very accurate balance, the differences and ratios of these weights gave him the differences and ratios of the times. This was done with such accuracy that although the operation was repeated many, many times, there was no appreciable discrepancy in the results.

==== The law of falling bodies ====
While Aristotle had observed that heavier objects fall more quickly than lighter ones, in Two New Sciences Galileo postulated that this was due not to inherently stronger forces acting on the heavier objects, but to the countervailing forces of air resistance and friction. To compensate, he conducted experiments using a shallowly inclined ramp, smoothed so as to eliminate as much friction as possible, on which he rolled down balls of different weights. In this manner, he was able to provide empirical evidence that matter accelerates vertically downward at a constant rate, regardless of mass, due to the effects of gravity.

The unreported experiment found in folio 116V tested the constant rate of acceleration in falling bodies due to gravity. This experiment consisted of dropping a ball from specified heights onto a deflector in order to transfer its motion from vertical to horizontal. The data from the inclined plane experiments were used to calculate the expected horizontal motion. However, discrepancies were found in the results of the experiment: the observed horizontal distances disagreed with the calculated distances expected for a constant rate of acceleration. Galileo attributed the discrepancies to air resistance in the unreported experiment, and friction in the inclined plane experiment. These discrepancies forced Galileo to assert that the postulate held only under "ideal conditions", i.e., in the absence of friction and/or air resistance.

==== Bodies in motion ====
Aristotelian physics argued that the Earth must not move as humans are unable to perceive the effects of this motion. A popular justification of this is the experiment of an archer shooting an arrow straight up into the air. If the Earth were moving, Aristotle argued, the arrow should fall in a different location than the launch point. Galileo refuted this argument in Dialogues Concerning the Two Chief World Systems. He provided the example of sailors aboard a boat at sea. The boat is obviously in motion, but the sailors are unable to perceive this motion. If a sailor were to drop a weighted object from the mast, this object would fall at the base of the mast rather than behind it (due to the ship's forward motion). This was the result of simultaneously the horizontal and vertical motion of the ship, sailors, and ball.

==== Relativity of motions ====
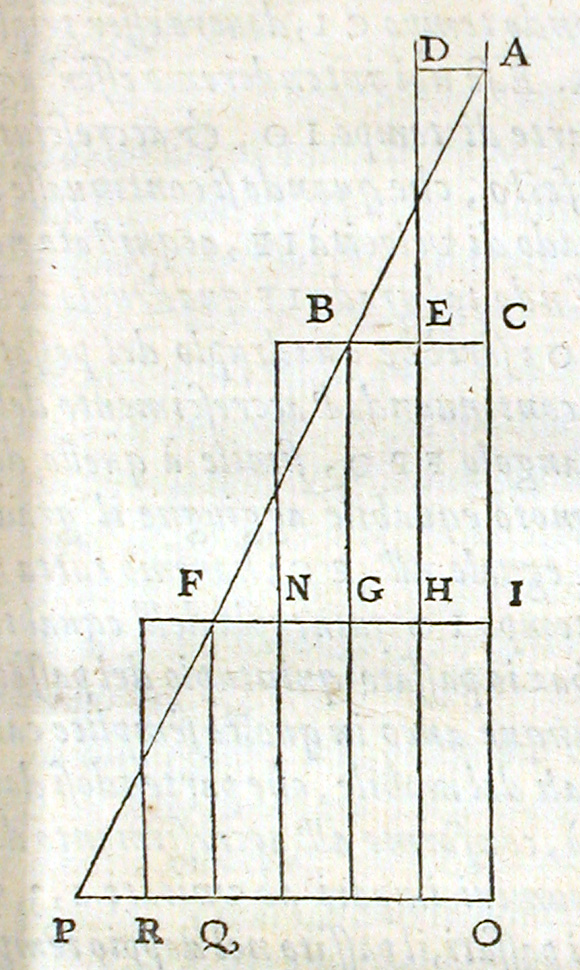
Picture in Galileo's Discorsi (1638) illustrating relativity of motions

One of Galileo's experiments regarding falling bodies was that describing the relativity of motions, explaining that, under the right circumstances, "one motion may be superimposed upon another without effect upon either...". In Two New Sciences, Galileo made his case for this argument and it would become the basis of Newton's first law, the law of inertia.

He poses the question of what happens to a ball dropped from the mast of a sailing ship or an arrow fired into the air on the deck. According to Aristotle's physics, the ball dropped should land at the stern of the ship as it falls straight down from the point of origin. Likewise the arrow when fired straight up should not land in the same spot if the ship is in motion. Galileo offers that there are two independent motions at play. One is the accelerating vertical motion caused by gravity while the other is the uniform horizontal motion caused by the moving ship which continues to influence the trajectory of the ball through the principle of inertia. The combination of these two motions results in a parabolic curve. The observer cannot identify this parabolic curve because the ball and observer share the horizontal movement imparted to them by the ship, meaning only the perpendicular, vertical motion is perceivable. Surprisingly, nobody had tested this theory with the simple experiments needed to gain a conclusive result until Pierre Gassendi published the results of said experiments in his letters entitled De Motu Impresso a Motore Translato (1642).

== Infinity ==
The book also contains a discussion of infinity. Galileo considers the example of numbers and their squares. He starts by noting that:

It cannot be denied that there are as many [squares] as there are numbers because every number is a [square] root of some square: 1 ↔ 1, 2 ↔ 4, 3 ↔ 9, 4 ↔ 16, and so on.

But he notes what appears to be a contradiction:

Yet at the outset we said there are many more numbers than squares, since the larger portion of them are not squares. Not only so, but the proportionate number of squares diminishes as we pass to larger numbers.

(In modern language, there is a bijection between the set of positive integers N and the set of squares S, and S is a proper subset of N of density zero.) He resolves the contradiction by denying the possibility of comparing infinite numbers (and of comparing infinite and finite numbers):

We can only infer that the totality of all numbers is infinite, that the number of squares is infinite, and that the number of their roots is infinite; neither is the number of squares less than the totality of all numbers, nor the latter greater than the former; and finally the attributes "equal", greater", and "less", are not applicable to infinite, but only to finite, quantities.

This conclusion, that ascribing sizes to infinite sets should be ruled impossible, owing to the contradictory results obtained from these two ostensibly natural ways of attempting to do so, is a resolution to the problem that is consistent with, but less powerful than, the methods used in modern mathematics. The resolution to the problem may be generalized by considering Galileo's first definition of what it means for sets to have equal sizes, that is, the ability to put them in one-to-one correspondence. This turns out to yield a way of comparing the sizes of infinite sets that is free from contradictory results.

These issues of infinity arise from problems of rolling circles. If two concentric circles of different radii roll along lines, then if the larger does not slip it appears clear that the smaller must slip. But in what way? Galileo attempts to clarify the matter by considering hexagons and then extending to rolling 100 000-gons, or n-gons, where he shows that a finite number of finite slips occur on the inner shape. Eventually, he concludes "the line traversed by the larger circle consists then of an infinite number of points which completely fill it; while that which is traced by the smaller circle consists of an infinite number of points which leave empty spaces and only partly fill the line," which would not be considered satisfactory now.

== Reactions by commentators ==
So great a contribution to physics was Two New Sciences that scholars have long maintained that the book anticipated Isaac Newton's laws of motion.

— Stephen Hawking

Galileo ... is the father of modern physics—indeed of modern science

— Albert Einstein

Part of Two New Sciences was pure mathematics, as has been pointed out by the mathematician Alfréd Rényi, who said that it was the most significant book on mathematics in over 2000 years: Greek mathematics did not deal with motion, and so they never formulated mathematical laws of motion, even though Archimedes developed differentiation and integration. Two New Sciences opened the way to treating physics mathematically by treating motion mathematically for the first time. The Greek mathematician Zeno had designed his paradoxes to prove that motion could not be treated mathematically, and that any attempt to do so would lead to paradoxes. (He regarded this as an inevitable limitation of mathematics.) Aristotle reinforced this belief, saying that mathematic could only deal with abstract objects that were immutable. Galileo used the very methods of the Greeks to show that motion could indeed be treated mathematically. His idea was to separate out the paradoxes of the infinite from Zeno's paradoxes. He did this in several steps. First, he showed that the infinite sequence S of the squares 1, 4, 9, 16, ...contained as many elements as the sequence N of all positive integers (infinity); this is now referred to as Galileo's paradox. Then, using Greek style geometry, he showed a short line interval contained as many points as a longer interval. At some point he formulates the general principle that a smaller infinite set can have just as many points as a larger infinite set containing it. It was then clear that Zeno's paradoxes on motion resulted entirely from this paradoxical behavior of infinite quantities. Renyi said that, having removed this 2000-year-old stumbling block, Galileo went on to introduce his mathematical laws of motion, anticipating Newton.

=== Gassendi's thoughts ===
Pierre Gassendi defended Galileo's opinions in his book, De Motu Impresso a Motore Translato. In Howard Jones' article, Gassendi's Defence of Galileo: The Politics of Discretion, Jones says Gassendi displayed an understanding of Galileo's arguments and a clear grasp of their implications for the physical objections to the earth's motion.

=== Koyré's thoughts ===
The law of falling bodies was published by Galileo in 1638. But in the 20th century some authorities challenged the reality of Galileo's experiments. In particular, the French historian of science Alexandre Koyré bases his doubt on the fact that the experiments reported in Two New Sciences to determine the law of acceleration of falling bodies, required accurate measurements of time which appeared to be impossible with the technology of 1600. According to Koyré, the law was created deductively, and the experiments were merely illustrative thought experiments. In fact, Galileo's water clock (described above) provided sufficiently accurate measurements of time to confirm his conjectures.

Later research, however, has validated the experiments. The experiments on falling bodies (actually rolling balls) were replicated using the methods described by Galileo, and the precision of the results was consistent with Galileo's report. Later research into Galileo's unpublished working papers from 1604 clearly showed the reality of the experiments and even indicated the particular results that led to the time-squared law.

== See also ==
- De Motu Antiquiora (Galileo's earliest investigations of the motion of falling bodies)
- Le Mecaniche (Galileo's early refinements of his investigation of mechanics)
