= Stillman Drake =

American-born Canadian historian of science (1910–1993)

- Born: December 24, 1910; Berkeley, California, US
- Died: October 6, 1993 (aged 82); Toronto, Ontario, Canada
- Occupation: Historian of science
- Awards: Guggenheim Fellowship (1971, 1976); Galileo Galilei Prize (1984); George Sarton Medal (1988)

Academic background
- Education: University of California, Berkeley (BA, 1932)

Academic work
- Discipline: Historian of science
- Sub-discipline: Early modern period
- Institutions: University of Toronto (1967–1979)

Stillman Drake (December 24, 1910 – October 6, 1993) was an American-born Canadian historian of science best known for his work on Galileo Galilei. He was born and educated in Berkeley, California and then worked in municipal finance in the US and Puerto Rico until moving to the University of Toronto in 1967. Including his translations, Drake wrote 16 books on Galileo and contributed to 15 others. He was a winner of the Galileo Galilei Prize (1984) and the George Sarton Medal (1988).

== Early life and education ==
Drake was born on December 24, 1910 in Berkeley, California. He attended Marin Junior College 1928–1930, then earned a bachelor's degree from the University of California, Berkeley in philosophy 1930–1932, where he met lifelong friend and historian of mathematics Kenneth O. May. He then earned a certificate in mathematical instruction in 1934, but left academia to work in financial administration of US Great Depression programs.

In 1938, he came across the banker-philosopher Alexander Bryan Johnson's A Treatise on Language (1828), which inspired him to pursue his own unusual career as a book collector and autodidact outside of academia.

== Career ==
Drake received his first academic appointment in 1967 at the age of 57, as a full professor with immediate tenure at the University of Toronto, after a career as a financial administrator, particularly organizing war bonds and municipal finance, in California and Puerto Rico with the US government and the World Bank system. During his time in finance he began his studies of the works of Galileo and he translated Galileo's Dialogue Concerning the Two Chief World Systems (1953), parts of four of Galileo's works in Discoveries and Opinions of Galileo (1957), and Galileo's The Assayer in The Controversy of Comets (1960), co-authored with C. D. O'Malley.

Although Harvard had attempted to recruit him during this time, he remained in financial administration until he was attracted to Toronto by an offer of full professorship with immediate tenure after he gave a talk "The Scientific Personality of Galileo" in October 1966 at Toronto's newly-organizing Institute for the History and Philosophy of Science and Technology (IHPST); the offer was arranged by his friend Kenneth O. May and historian of technology and organizer of the IHPST John Abrams. He spent his entire academic career, beginning in July 1967 through his retirement in 1979, at the University of Toronto's IHPST; he was one of its founding faculty.

Including his translations, Drake wrote 16 books on Galileo and contributed to 15 others. Possibly his most significant contribution to the history of science was his defense of Galileo's experiments as documented in his translation of Two New Sciences, chiefly in his footnotes. Drake showed how the complex interaction of experimental measurement, such as the famous Leaning Tower of Pisa experiment, and mathematical analysis led Galileo to his law of falling bodies. His footnotes to Two New Sciences refuted Alexandre Koyré's claim that experiment played no significant part in Galileo's thought by demonstration, for example in his models of Galileo's experiments which are described in his footnotes.

In 1980, Roger Hahn wrote that Drake was "probably the foremost authority on Galileo of our times". In 1984 Drake was awarded the Galileo Galilei Prize for the Italian History of Science by the Italian Rotary Clubs and the University of Pisa. The jury was composed of Italian epistemologists and science historians.

In 1988 Drake was awarded the Sarton Medal by the History of Science Society. In 1990, he received the festschrift Nature, Experiment, and the Sciences: Essays on Galileo and the History of Science in Honour of Stillman Drake, edited by Trevor H. Levere and William R. Shea. He was a fellow of the American Academy of Arts and Sciences (1981), of the Royal Society of Canada, and of the International Academy of the History of Science; he also won two Guggenheim fellowships (1971, 1976).

Drake was reputedly "one of the greatest collectors of books and manuscripts of the twentieth century" while he worked in finance, and the books that he brought with him to Toronto were housed at the university in what later became the Thomas Fisher Rare Book Library. University of Toronto librarian Richard Landon wrote that "at a single stroke" his donation "transformed the strength and emphasis of the University Library and provided the basis for what has become one of the richest collections of early scientific works, from many countries and in many languages, in North America." He is best known for his collection of scientific works, but he also collected work related to James Joyce, Sherlock Holmes, and Alexander Bryan Johnson.

== Personal life and death ==
Drake married twice. In 1967, he married Florence Selvin Casaroli in California, and this remarriage is thought to have motivated his interest in moving to Toronto and joining academia. He became a Canadian citizen in 1986.

Several years after receiving his bachelor's degree at the University of California, Berkeley (1932), Drake joined several college friends in creating the original version of a board game called Empire in 1938, which went on to inspire Peter Langston to create his computer game of the same name.

He died on October 6, 1993.

== Selected works ==
- (1949) Book of Anglo-Saxon Verse.
- (1953) Dialogue Concerning the Two Chief World Systems. Berkeley: University of California Press.
- (1957) Discoveries and Opinions of Galileo. New York: Doubleday & Company. ISBN 0-385-09239-3
- (1960) On Motion and On Mechanics: Comprising De Motu (ca. 1590) and Le Meccaniche (ca. 1600). Madison, WI: University of Wisconsin Press.
- (1973) "Galileo's Discovery of the Law of Free Fall," Scientific American 228(5): 84–92.
- (1974) Two New Sciences. University of Wisconsin Press. ISBN 0-299-06404-2. A new translation including sections on centers of gravity and the force of percussion.
- (1978) Galileo At Work. Chicago: University of Chicago Press. ISBN 0-226-16226-5
- (1982) Forming Book Collections. Toronto: The Amtmann Circle.
- (1990) Galileo: Pioneer Scientist. Toronto: University of Toronto Press. ISBN 0-8020-2725-3. ISBN 978-0-8020-2725-2.
- (1999) Essays on Galileo and the History and Philosophy of Science (3 vols.). Toronto: University of Toronto Press.
