= Timeline of Delft =

The following is a timeline of the history of the municipality of Delft, Netherlands.

== Prior to 18th century ==
- 1075 - Town established by Godfrey III, Duke of Lower Lorraine. (Godfrey III died in 1069; perhaps it was his son Godfrey the Hunchback)
- 1246 - Delft granted city rights by William II of Holland.
- 1250 - St. Bartholomew's Church construction begins.
- 1383 - Nieuwe Kerk (Delft) (church) construction begins.
- 1389 - Canal to the Meuse river created.
- 1400 - Eastern Gate (Delft) built.
- 1403 - Agathaklooster (convent) established.
- 1470 - Carthusian monastery established.
- 1477 - Printing press in operation; Delft Bible issued.
- 1536 - 3 May: Delft fire of 1536.
- 1575 - Museum Het Prinsenhof converted into a residence for the counts of Orange.
- 1583 - Birth of Hugo Grotius, philosopher, political theorist and poet.
- 1584 - William I, Prince of Orange assassinated in Museum Het Prinsenhof.
- 1586 - Scientists Simon Stevin and Jan Cornets de Groot conduct a landmark experiment on the effects of gravity from the roof of the Nieuwe Kerk.
- 1611 - Guild of Saint Luke founded (approximate date).
- 1618 - City Hall (Delft) rebuilt.
- 1621 - Bank of Delft established.
- 1632 - Future scientist Antonie van Leeuwenhoek and future artist Johannes Vermeer born in Delft.
- 1647 - Production of Delft pottery begins to expand.
- 1652 - Fabritius paints A View of Delft artwork.
- 1653 - Royal Delft porcelain factory begins operating.
- 1654 - 12 October: Delft Explosion.
- 1661 - Vermeer paints View of Delft artwork.
- 1692 - Armamentarium built.

== 18th-19th centuries ==
- 1721 - Delftsche Courant newspaper begins publication.
- 1769 - Stadsleenbank Delft (bank) built (approximate date).
- 1842 - Royal Academy of Delft (engineering school) established.
- 1859 - Delft City Archive active.
- 1862 - Delft Synagogue built in Koornmarkt (Delft).
- 1866 - Population: 21,877.
- 1882 - Maria van Jessekerk (church) built.
- 1884 - Agnetapark workers' housing developed.
- 1886
  - Hugo Grotius monument erected in the Markt (Delft).
  - Sint-Hippolytuskerk (Delft) (church) built.
- 1895 - Watertower (Delft) built.
- 1900 - Population: 31,582.

== 20th century ==
- 1905 - Delft Institute of Technology active.
- 1911 - Museum Het Prinsenhof active.
- 1919 - Population: 38,433.
- 1920 - Gerardus van Baren becomes mayor.
- 1921 - Hof van Delft and Vrijenban become part of Delft.
- 1970 - Roadway speed bump installed.
- 1976 - Tanthof development begins.
- 1977 - City Statistisch Jaarboek (yearbook) begins publication.

== 21st century ==
- 2004 - Bas Verkerk becomes mayor.
- 2007 - DOK Delft (library) built.
- 2015 - Delft railway station rebuilt.
- 2016
  - Marja van Bijsterveldt becomes mayor.
  - Population: 101,053.

== See also ==
- History of Delft
- List of mayors of Delft
- List of rijksmonuments in Delft
- History of the County of Holland
- Timelines of other municipalities in the Netherlands: Amsterdam, Breda, Eindhoven, Groningen, Haarlem, The Hague, 's-Hertogenbosch, Leiden, Maastricht, Nijmegen, Rotterdam, Utrecht

== Bibliography ==
In English

- Thomas Nugent (1749), "Delft", The Grand Tour, vol. 1: Netherlands, London: S. Birt, hdl:2027/mdp.39015030762598
- Abraham Rees (1819), "Delft", The Cyclopaedia, London: Longman, Hurst, Rees, Orme & Brown, hdl:2027/mdp.39015068387698
- "Delft", Handbook for Travellers on the Continent (8th ed.), London: John Murray, 1851
- William Henry Overall, ed. (1870). "Delft, Holland". Dictionary of Chronology. London: William Tegg. hdl:2027/uc2.ark:/13960/t9m32q949.
- W. Pembroke Fetridge (1885), "Delft", Harper's Hand-book for Travellers in Europe and the East, New York: Harper & Brothers
- "Delft". Chambers's Encyclopaedia. London. 1901. hdl:2027/hvd.hn52k6.
- "Delft", Belgium and Holland (15th ed.), Leipzig: Karl Baedeker, 1910, OCLC 397759 ( 1881 ed.)
- "Delft" . Encyclopædia Britannica. Vol. 7 (11th ed.). 1910. p. 954.
- Benjamin Vincent (1910), "Delft", Haydn's Dictionary of Dates (25th ed.), London: Ward, Lock & Co., hdl:2027/uc2.ark:/13960/t41r6xh8t

In Dutch

- D. E. van Bleyswyck. Beschryvinge der stadt Delft (Delft, 1667)
- R. Boitet. Beschryving der stadt Delft (Delft, 1729)
- Henri Zondervan, ed. (1916), "Delft", Winkler Prins' Geillustreerde Encyclopaedie (in Dutch), vol. 6 (4th ed.), Amsterdam: Uitgevers-Maatschappy „Elsevier“, hdl:2027/mdp.39015068310138
- P. Beydals. Kroniek der stad Delft (The Hague, 1936)
- G. van Herwijnen, ed. (1978). "Delft". Bibliografie van de stedengeschiedenis van Nederland [Bibliography of Urban History in the Netherlands] (in Dutch). Brill. pp. 178–184. ISBN 90-04-05700-5.
- I. V. T. Spaander and R.-A. Leeuw, eds. De Stad Delft: Cultur en maatschappij (Delft, 1979–82) (3 vols.)
