= Galileo's Leaning Tower of Pisa experiment =

Celebrated demonstration of gravity

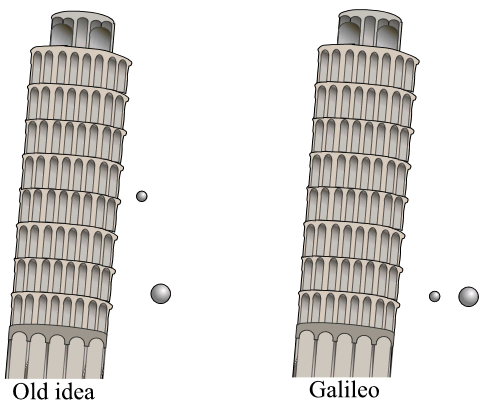
Comparison of the antiquated view and the outcome of the experiment (size of the spheres represent their masses, not their volumes)

Between 1589 and 1592, the Italian scientist Galileo Galilei (then professor of mathematics at the University of Pisa) is said to have dropped "unequal weights of the same material" from the Leaning Tower of Pisa to demonstrate that their time of descent was independent of their mass, according to a biography by Galileo's pupil Vincenzo Viviani, composed in 1654 and published in 1717. The basic premise had already been demonstrated by Italian experimenters a few decades earlier.

According to the story, Galileo discovered through this experiment that the objects fell with the same acceleration, proving his prediction true, while at the same time disproving Aristotle's theory of gravity (which states that objects fall at speed proportional to their mass). Though Viviani wrote that Galileo conducted "repeated experiments made from the height of the Leaning Tower of Pisa in the presence of other professors and all the students," most historians consider it to have been a thought experiment rather than a physical test.

== Background ==
The 6th-century Byzantine Greek philosopher and Aristotelian commentator John Philoponus argued that the Aristotelian assertion that objects fall proportionately to their weight was incorrect. By 1544, according to Benedetto Varchi, the Aristotelian premise was disproven experimentally by at least two Italians. In 1551, Domingo de Soto suggested that objects in free fall accelerate uniformly. Two years later, mathematician Giambattista Benedetti questioned why two balls, one made of iron and one of wood, would fall at the same speed. All of this preceded the 1564 birth of Galileo Galilei.

=== Delft tower experiment ===
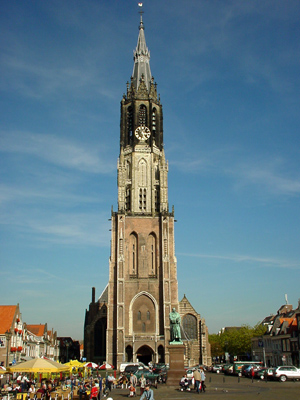
The Nieuwe Kerk in Delft, where the experiment by Stevin and de Groot took place

A similar experiment was conducted in Delft by the Flemish mathematician and physicist Simon Stevin and Jan Cornets de Groot (the father of Hugo de Groot). The experiment is described in Stevin's 1586 book De Beghinselen der Weeghconst (The Principles of Statics), a landmark book on statics:

Let us take (as the highly educated Jan Cornets de Groot, the diligent researcher of the mysteries of Nature, and I have done) two balls of lead, the one ten times bigger and heavier than the other, and let them drop together from 30 feet high, and it will show, that the lightest ball is not ten times longer under way than the heaviest, but they fall together at the same time on the ground. ... This proves that Aristotle is wrong.

== Galileo's experiment ==
At the time when Viviani asserts that the experiment took place, Galileo had not yet formulated the final version of his law of falling bodies. He had, however, formulated an earlier version which predicted that bodies of the same material falling through the same medium would fall at the same speed. This was contrary to what Aristotle had taught: that heavy objects fall faster than the lighter ones, and in direct proportion to their weight. While this story has been retold in popular accounts, there is no account by Galileo himself of such an experiment, and many historians believe that it was a thought experiment. An exception is Stillman Drake, who argues that it took place, more or less as Viviani described it, as a demonstration for students.

Galileo's thought experiment concerned the outcome (c) of attaching a small stone (a) to a larger one (b)

Galileo set out his ideas about falling bodies, and about projectiles in general, in his book Two New Sciences (1638). The two sciences were the science of motion, which became the foundation-stone of physics, and the science of materials and construction, an important contribution to engineering. Galileo arrived at his hypothesis by a famous thought experiment outlined in his book On Motion. He writes:

Salviati. If then we take two bodies whose natural speeds are different, it is clear that on uniting the two, the more rapid one will be partly retarded by the slower, and the slower will be somewhat hastened by the swifter. Do you not agree with me in this opinion?

Simplicio. You are unquestionably right.

Salviati. But if this is true, and if a large stone moves with a speed of, say, eight while a smaller moves with a speed of four, then when they are united, the system will move with a speed less than eight; but the two stones when tied together make a stone larger than that which before moved with a speed of eight. Hence the heavier body moves with less speed than the lighter; an effect which is contrary to your supposition. Thus you see how, from your assumption that the heavier body moves more rapidly than the lighter one, I infer that the heavier body moves more slowly.

His argument is that if we assume heavier objects do indeed fall faster than lighter ones (and conversely, lighter objects fall slower), the string will soon pull taut as the lighter object retards the fall of the heavier object. But the system considered as a whole is heavier than the heavy object alone, and therefore should fall faster. This contradiction leads one to conclude the assumption is false.

== Later performances ==
Hammer and feather drop on the Moon by astronaut David Scott, Apollo 15 (1.38 MB, ogg/Theora format)

Astronaut David Scott performed a version of the experiment on the Moon during the Apollo 15 mission in 1971, dropping a feather and a hammer from his hands. Because of the negligible lunar atmosphere, there was no drag on the feather, which reached the lunar surface at the same time as the hammer.

The basic premise behind these experiments is now known as the (weak) equivalence principle. Galileo's hypothesis that inertial mass (resistance to acceleration) equals gravitational mass (weight) was extended by Albert Einstein to include special relativity and that combination became a key concept leading to the development of the modern theory of gravity, general relativity. Physical experiments following Galileo increased the precision of the equivalence to better than one part in a trillion.

== See also ==
- Delft tower experiment
- Terminal velocity
