= Timeline of fundamental physics discoveries =

This timeline lists significant discoveries in physics and the laws of nature, including experimental discoveries, theoretical proposals that were confirmed experimentally, and theories that have significantly influenced current thinking in modern physics. Such discoveries are often a multi-step, multi-person process. Multiple discovery sometimes occurs when multiple research groups discover the same phenomenon at about the same time, and scientific priority is often disputed. The listings below include some of the most significant people and ideas by date of publication or experiment.

== Antiquity ==
- 624–546 BCE – Thales of Miletus: Introduced natural philosophy
- 610–546 BCE – Anaximander: Concept of Earth floating in space
- 460–370 BCE – Democritus: Atomism via thought experiment
- 384–322 BCE – Aristotle: Aristotelian physics, earliest effective theory of physics
- c. 300 BCE – Euclid: Euclidean geometry
- c. 250 BCE – Archimedes: Archimedes' principle
- 310–230 BCE – Aristarchos: Proposed heliocentricism
- 276–194 BCE – Eratosthenes: Circumference of the Earth measured
- 190–150 BCE – Seleucus: Support of heliocentrism based on reasoning
- 220–150 BCE – Apollonius: and Hipparchus: Invention of Astrolabe
- 205–86 BCE – Hipparchus or unknown: Antikythera mechanism an analog computer of planetary motions
- 129 BCE – Hipparchus: Hipparchus star catalog of the entire sky and precession of the equinoxes
- 60 CE – Hero of Alexandria: Catoptrics: Hero's principle of the shortest path of light
- c.150 CE – Ptolemy: Ptolomaic model standardized geocentricism

== Middle Ages ==
- 500 CE – John Philoponus: Theory of impetus
- 984 CE – Ibn Sahl: Law of refraction
- 1010 – Ibn al-Haytham (Alhazen): Optics, finite speed of light
- c. 1030 – Ibn Sina (Avicenna): Concept of force
- c. 1050 – al-Biruni: Speed of light is much larger than speed of sound
- c. 1100 – Al-Baghdadi: Theory of motion with distinction between velocity and acceleration

== 16th century ==
- 1514 – Nicolaus Copernicus: Heliocentrism
- 1586 – Simon Stevin: Delft tower experiment

== 17th century ==
- 1608 – Earliest known telescopes
- 1609, 1619 – Kepler: Kepler's laws of planetary motion
- 1610 – Galileo Galilei: discovered the Galilean moons of Jupiter
- 1613 – Galileo Galilei: Inertia
- 1621 – Willebrord Snellius: Snell's law
- 1632 – Galileo Galilei: The Galilean principle (the laws of motion are the same in all inertial frames)
- 1660 – Blaise Pascal: Pascal's law
- 1660 – Robert Hooke: Hooke's law
- 1662 – Robert Boyle: Boyle's law
- 1663 – Otto von Guericke: first electrostatic generator
- 1676 – Ole Rømer: Rømer's determination of the speed of light traveling from the moons of Jupiter.
- 1678 – Christiaan Huygens mathematical wave theory of light, published in his Treatise on Light
- 1687 – Isaac Newton: Newton's laws of motion, and Newton's law of universal gravitation

== 18th century ==
- 1738 – Daniel Bernoulli: First model of the kinetic theory of gases
- 1745–46 – Ewald Georg von Kleist and Pieter van Musschenbroek: discovery of the Leyden jar
- 1752 – Benjamin Franklin: kite experiment
- 1760 – Joseph-Louis Lagrange: Lagrangian mechanics
- 1782 – Antoine Lavoisier: conservation of mass
- 1785 – Charles-Augustin de Coulomb: Coulomb's inverse-square law for electric charges confirmed
- 1800 – Alessandro Volta: discovery of voltaic pile

== 19th century ==
- 1800 – William Herschel: Infrared light
- 1801 – Thomas Young: Wave theory of light
- 1801 – Johann Wilhelm Ritter: Ultraviolet light
- 1803 – John Dalton: Atomic theory of matter
- 1806 – Thomas Young: Kinetic energy
- 1814 – Augustin-Jean Fresnel: Wave theory of light, optical interference
- 1820 – André-Marie Ampère, Jean-Baptiste Biot, and Félix Savart: Evidence for electromagnetic interactions (Biot–Savart law)
- 1822 – Joseph Fourier: Heat equation
- 1824 – Nicolas Léonard Sadi Carnot: Ideal gas cycle analysis (Carnot cycle), internal combustion engine
- 1826 – Ampère's circuital law
- 1827 – Georg Ohm: Electrical resistance
- 1831 – Michael Faraday: Faraday's law of induction
- 1833 – William Rowan Hamilton: Hamiltonian mechanics
- 1838 – Michael Faraday: Lines of force
- 1838 – Wilhelm Eduard Weber and Carl Friedrich Gauss: Earth's magnetic field
- 1842–43 – William Thomson, 1st Baron Kelvin and Julius von Mayer: Conservation of energy
- 1842 – Christian Doppler: Doppler effect
- 1845 – Michael Faraday: Faraday rotation (interaction of light and magnetic field)
- 1847 – Hermann von Helmholtz & James Prescott Joule: Conservation of Energy 2
- 1850–51 – William Thomson, 1st Baron Kelvin & Rudolf Clausius: Second law of thermodynamics
- 1857 – Rudolf Clausius: Introduced translational, rotational, and vibrational molecular motions
- 1857 – Rudolf Clausius: Introduced the concept of mean free path
- 1860 – James Clerk Maxwell: Introduced statistical mechanics with the Maxwell distribution
- 1861 – Gustav Kirchhoff: Black body
- 1861–62 – Maxwell's equations
- 1863 – Rudolf Clausius: Entropy
- 1864 – James Clerk Maxwell: A Dynamical Theory of the Electromagnetic Field (electromagnetic radiation)
- 1867 – James Clerk Maxwell: On the Dynamical Theory of Gases (kinetic theory of gases)
- 1871–89 – Ludwig Boltzmann & Josiah Willard Gibbs: Statistical mechanics (Boltzmann equation, 1872)
- 1873 – Maxwell: A Treatise on Electricity and Magnetism
- 1884 – Boltzmann derives Stefan radiation law
- 1887 – Michelson–Morley experiment
- 1887 – Heinrich Rudolf Hertz: Electromagnetic waves
- 1888 – Johannes Rydberg: Rydberg formula
- 1889, 1892 – Lorentz–FitzGerald contraction
- 1893 – Wilhelm Wien: Wien's displacement law for black-body radiation
- 1895 – Wilhelm Röntgen: X-rays
- 1896 – Henri Becquerel: Radioactivity
- 1896 – Pieter Zeeman: Zeeman effect
- 1897 – J. J. Thomson: Electron discovered
- 1900 – Max Planck: Formula for black-body radiation – the quanta solution to radiation ultraviolet catastrophe
- 1900 – Paul Villard: Gamma rays

== 20th century ==
- 1904 – J. J. Thomson's plum pudding model of the atom 1904
- 1905 – Albert Einstein: Special relativity, proposes light quantum (later named photon) to explain the photoelectric effect, Brownian motion, Mass–energy equivalence
- 1908 – Hermann Minkowski: Minkowski space
- 1911 – Ernest Rutherford: Discovery of the atomic nucleus (Rutherford model)
- 1911 – Kamerlingh Onnes: Superconductivity
- 1912 – Victor Francis Hess: Cosmic rays
- 1913 – Niels Bohr: Bohr model of the atom
- 1915 – Albert Einstein: General relativity
- 1915 – Emmy Noether: Noether's theorem relates symmetries to conservation laws.
- 1916 – Schwarzschild metric modeling gravity outside a large sphere
- 1917 – Ernest Rutherford: Proton proved
- 1919 – Arthur Eddington: Light bending confirmed – evidence for general relativity
- 1919–1926 – Kaluza–Klein theory proposing unification of gravity and electromagnetism
- 1922 – Alexander Friedmann proposes expanding universe
- 1922–37 – Friedmann–Lemaître–Robertson–Walker metric cosmological model
- 1923 – Stern–Gerlach experiment
- 1923 – Edwin Hubble: Galaxies discovered
- 1923 – Arthur Compton: Particle nature of photons confirmed by observation of photon momentum
- 1924 – Bose–Einstein statistics
- 1924 – Louis de Broglie: De Broglie wave
- 1925 – Werner Heisenberg: Matrix mechanics
- 1925–27 – Niels Bohr & Max Planck: Quantum mechanics
- 1925 – Stellar structure understood
- 1926 – Fermi–Dirac Statistics
- 1926 – Erwin Schrödinger: Schrödinger Equation
- 1927 – Werner Heisenberg: Uncertainty principle
- 1927 – Georges Lemaître: Big Bang
- 1927 – Paul Dirac: Dirac equation
- 1927 – Max Born: Born rule
- 1928 – Paul Dirac proposes the antiparticle
- 1929 – Edwin Hubble: Expansion of the universe confirmed
- 1932 – Carl David Anderson: Antimatter (positrons) discovered
- 1932 – James Chadwick: Neutron discovered
- 1933 – Ernst Ruska: Invention of the electron microscope
- 1935 – Subrahmanyan Chandrasekhar: Chandrasekhar limit for black hole collapse
- 1937 – Majorana particle, hypothesized as a fermion that is its own antiparticle.
- 1937 – Muon discovered by Carl David Anderson and Seth Neddermeyer
- 1938 – Pyotr Kapitsa: Superfluidity discovered
- 1938 – Otto Hahn, Lise Meitner and Fritz Strassmann Nuclear fission discovered
- 1938–39 – Stellar fusion explains energy production in stars
- 1939 – Uranium fission discovered
- 1941 – Feynman path integral
- 1944 – Theory of magnetism in 2D: Ising model
- 1947 – C.F. Powell, Giuseppe Occhialini, César Lattes: Pion discovered
- 1948 – Richard Feynman, Shinichiro Tomonaga, Julian Schwinger, Freeman Dyson: Quantum electrodynamics
- 1948 – Invention of the maser and laser by Charles Townes
- 1948 – Feynman diagrams
- 1955 – Emilio Segrè and Owen Chamberlain: Antiproton discovered
- 1956 – Bruce Cork: Antineutron discovered
- 1956 – Electron neutrino discovered
- 1956–57 – Parity violation proved by Chien-Shiung Wu
- 1957 – Many-worlds, also called the relative state formulation or the Everett interpretation.
- 1957 – BCS theory explaining superconductivity
- 1959–60 – Role of topology in quantum physics predicted and confirmed
- 1962 – Murray Gell-Mann and Yuval Ne'eman: SU(3) theory of strong interactions
- 1962 – Muon neutrino discovered
- 1963 – Chien-Shiung Wu confirms the conserved vector current theory for weak interactions
- 1963 – Murray Gell-Mann and George Zweig: Quarks predicted
- 1964 – Bell's Theorem initiates quantitative study of quantum entanglement
- 1964 – First black hole, Cygnus X-1, discovered
- 1964 – CP violation discovered by James Cronin and Val Fitch.
- 1965 – Arno Penzias and Robert Wilson: Cosmic Microwave Background (CMB) discovered
- 1967 – Unification of weak interaction and electromagnetism (electroweak theory)
- 1967 – Solar neutrino problem found
- 1967 – Pulsars (rotating neutron stars) discovered
- 1968 – Experimental evidence for quarks found
- 1968 – Vera Rubin: Dark matter theories
- 1970–73 – Standard Model of elementary particles invented
- 1971 – Helium 3 superfluidity
- 1971–75 – Michael Fisher, Kenneth G. Wilson, and Leo Kadanoff: Renormalization group
- 1972 – Jacob Bekenstein: Black Hole Entropy suggested
- 1974 – Stephen Hawking: Black hole radiation (Hawking radiation) predicted
- 1974 – Charmed quark discovered
- 1975 – Tau lepton found
- 1975 – Abraham Pais and Sam Treiman: Introduction of the Standard Model of particle physics term
- 1977 – Bottom quark found
- 1977 – Anderson localization recognized (Nobel prize in 1977, Philip W. Anderson, Mott, Van Fleck)
- 1980 – Strangeness as a signature of quark–gluon plasma predicted
- 1980 – Richard Feynman proposes quantum computing
- 1980 – Quantum Hall effect
- 1981 – Alan Guth Theory of cosmic inflation proposed
- 1982 – Aspect experiment confirms violations of Bell's inequalities
- 1981 – Fractional quantum Hall effect discovered
- 1984 – W and Z bosons directly observed
- 1984 – First laboratory implementation of quantum cryptography
- 1987 – High-temperature superconductivity discovered in 1986, awarded Nobel prize in 1987 (J. Georg Bednorz and K. Alexander Müller)
- 1989–98 – Quantum annealing
- 1993 – Quantum teleportation of unknown states proposed
- 1994 – Shor's algorithm discovered, initiating the serious study of quantum computation
- 1994–97 – Matrix models/M-theory
- 1995 – Wolfgang Ketterle: Bose–Einstein condensate observed
- 1995 – Top quark discovered
- 1995–2000 – Econophysics and Kinetic exchange models of markets
- 1997 – Juan Maldacena proposed the AdS/CFT correspondence
- 1998 – Accelerating expansion of the universe discovered by the Supernova Cosmology Project and the High-Z Supernova Search Team
- 1998 – Atmospheric neutrino oscillation established
- 1999 – Lene Vestergaard Hau: Slow light experimentally demonstrated
- 2000 – Quark–gluon plasma found
- 2000 – Tau neutrino found

== 21st century ==
- 2001 – Solar neutrino oscillation observed, resolving the solar neutrino problem
- 2003 – WMAP observations of cosmic microwave background
- 2004 – Exceptional properties of graphene discovered
- 2007 – Giant magnetoresistance recognized (Nobel prize, Albert Fert and Peter Grünberg)
- 2008 – First artificial production of antimatter (positrons), by the LLNL
- 2008 – 16-year study of stellar orbits around Sagittarius A* provides strong evidence for a supermassive black hole at the centre of the Milky Way galaxy
- 2009 – Planck begins observations of cosmic microwave background
- 2012 – Higgs boson found by the Compact Muon Solenoid and ATLAS experiments at the Large Hadron Collider
- 2015 – Gravitational waves are observed.
- 2016 – Topological order – topological phase transitions and order – recognized (Nobel prize, David J. Thouless, F. Duncan M. Haldane and J. Michael Kosterlitz)
- 2019 – First image of a black hole
- 2023 – Experimental evidence of stochastic gravitational wave background
- 2023 – First "image" of the Milky Way in neutrinos instead of light
- 2024 – The Dark Energy Spectroscopic Instrument (DESI) released a precise 3D map of the cosmos, providing evidence that dark energy, the force accelerating the universe's expansion, may be weakening over time, challenging the cosmological constant and opening doors to new theories.
- 2025 – Discovery of a paradigm-shifting new black hole type, challenging existing theories of black hole formation and behavior.

== See also ==
- Physics
- List of timelines
- List of unsolved problems in physics
