= Biesland =

Former municipality in South Holland

Biesland was a municipality in the Dutch province of South Holland. It was located to the east of the city of Delft.

In the Middle Ages, Biesland was a manor of 3.9 km^{2}, owned first by the lords of Alkemade, and then by the city of Delft. When the local government was reorganized by the French occupation in 1812, Biesland was added to Pijnacker, but it became a separate municipality again in 1817. In 1833, it merged into Vrijenban.
