= Abtsregt =

Coordinates: 51°59′20″N 4°23′10″E

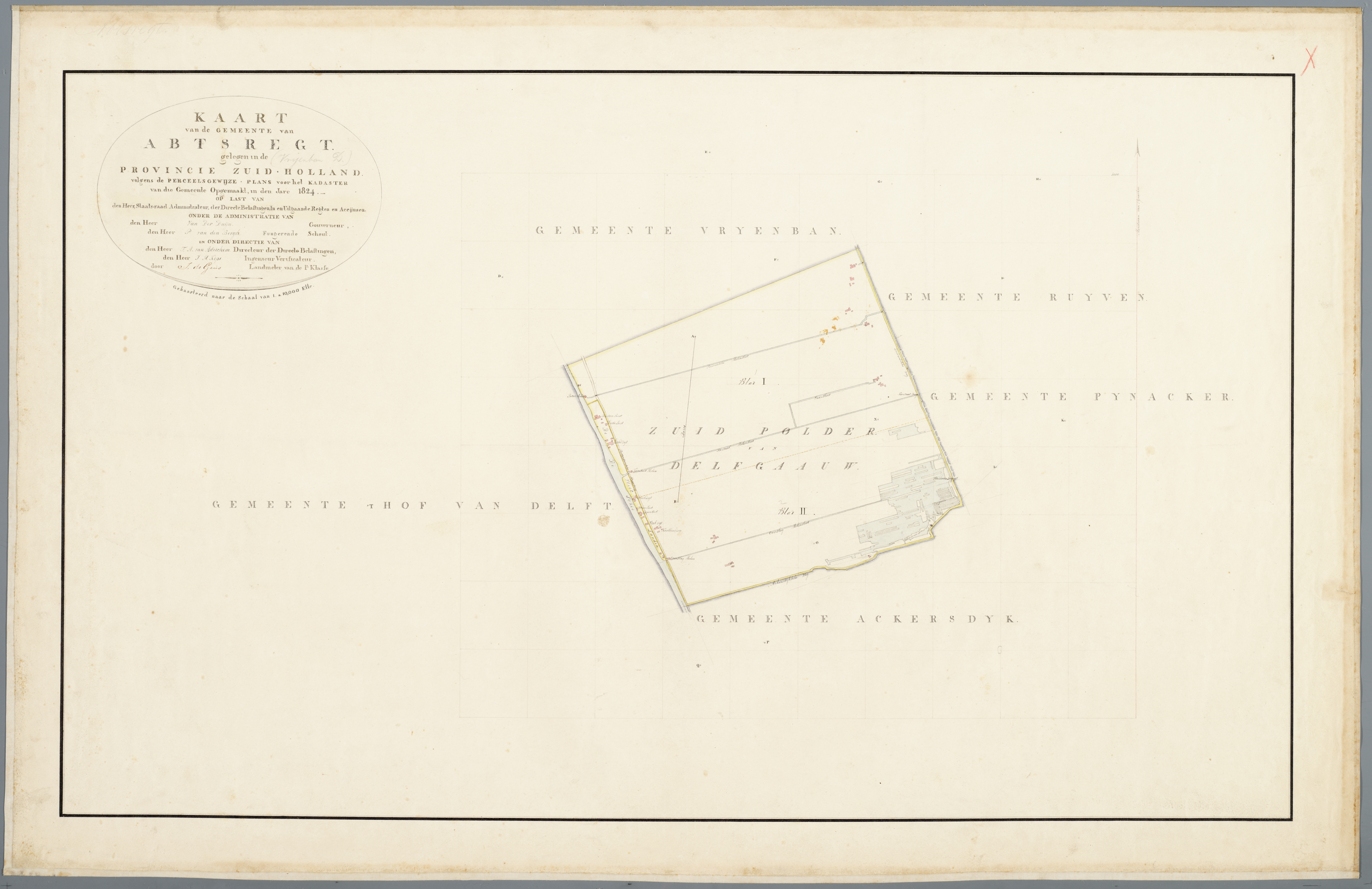
1824 map of Abtsregt

Abtsregt is a former municipality in the Dutch province of South Holland. It was located about 4 km southeast of Delft. The municipality existed from 1817 to 1855, when it merged with Vrijenban. It had around 200 inhabitants at that time.

Abtsregt coat of arms

According to historian Van der Aa, the name of the area ("Abbot's right") derives from an ancient privilege of the abbot of Egmond. Until 1595, he was entitled to choose the best property of any inhabitant of Abtsregt who died in the area.
