= Jan Cornets De Groot =

Dutch nobleman and scholar

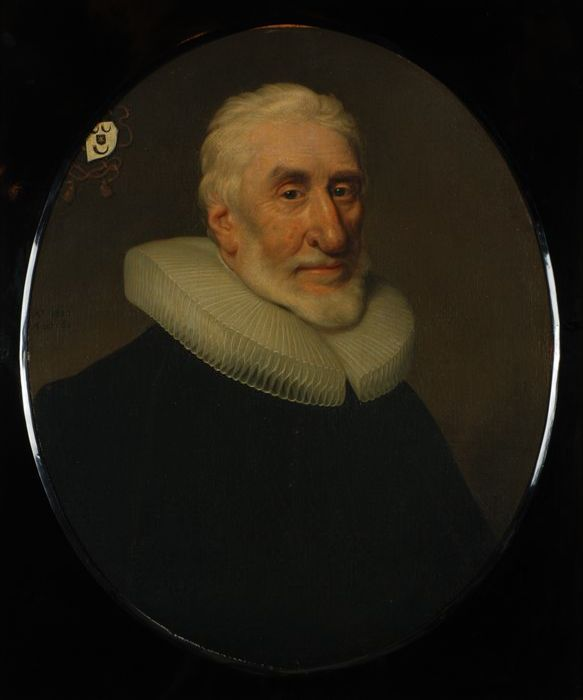
A 1636 copy of a painting by Michiel van Mierevelt

Jan Cornets De Groot or Johan Hugo De Groot Latinized as Janus Grotius (8 March 1554 – 3 May 1640) was a Dutch nobleman and scholar who conducted experiments in physics and explored natural philosophy. Along with Simon Stevin he experimented on the time taken for lead of different weights to fall to the ground to prove Aristotle wrong in the famous Delft tower experiment.

De Groot was born at Kraayenburg near Delft, son of Hugo Cornelisz and of Elselinge Van Heemskerck, and was possibly educated in the newly created University of Leiden. He also went to the University of Douai and studied arts and philosophy and following the high positions held by the Cornets de Groot family of Rotterdam who were a part of the Delft ruling class, he became alderman in 1589, a councillor and served as a mayor from 1591 to 1595. He became curator of the Leiden University where he also received a degree in law in 1596, and after 1617 became an advisor to the Count of Hohenlohe. He was involved in the construction of windmills and collaborated with Simon Stevin, and was well read in the works of Euclid, Ibn al-Haytham and other scholars. He also took an interest in mathematics, translating some of the works of Archimedes from Greek to Dutch. He also wrote some poetry.

De Groot married Alida Borren in 1582 and they had five children including the jurist Hugo Grotius.
