= Delft tower experiment =

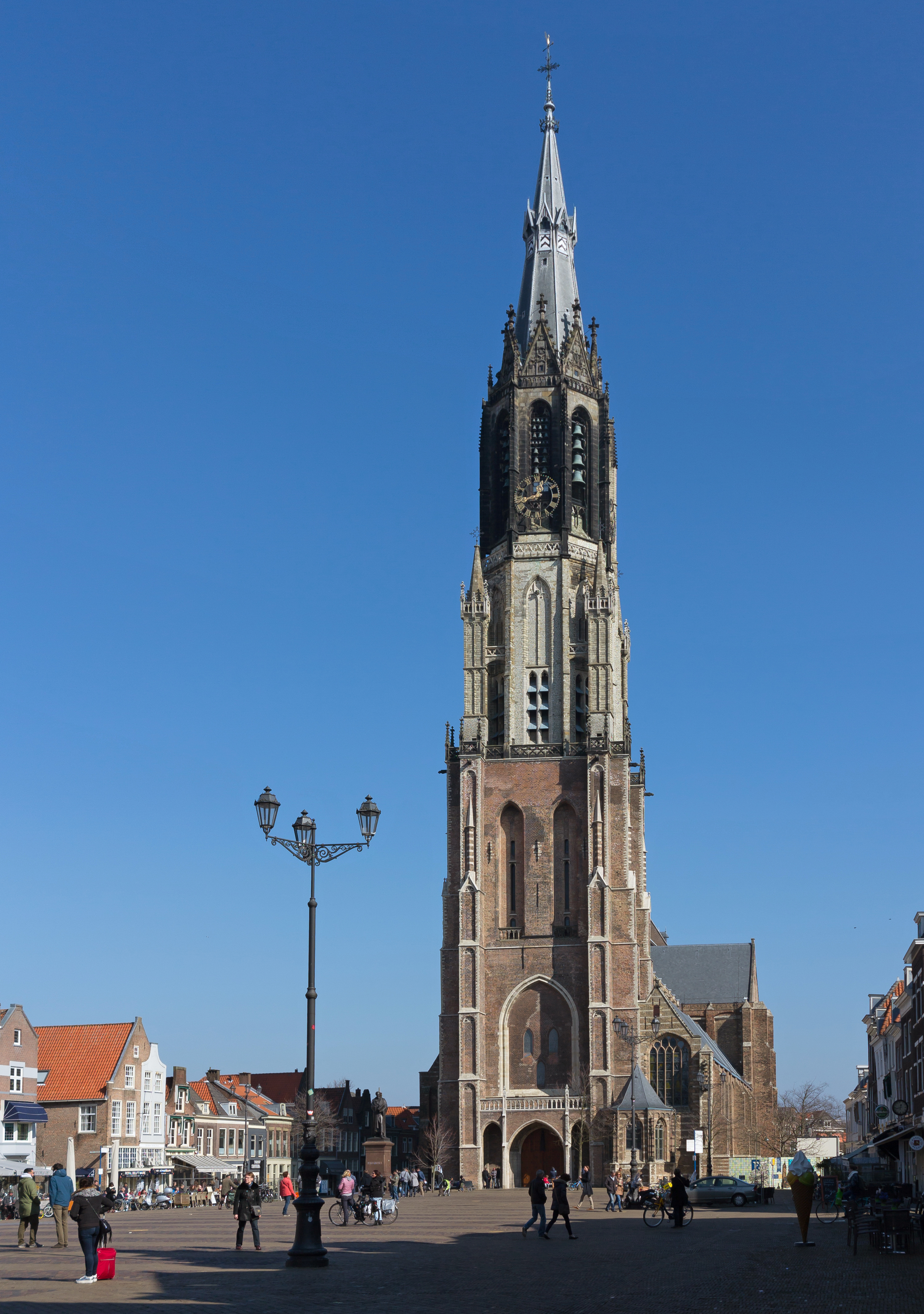
Nieuwe Kerk in Delft

In 1586, scientists Simon Stevin and Jan Cornets de Groot conducted an early scientific experiment on the effects of gravity. The experiment, which established that objects of identical size and different mass fall at the same speed, was conducted by dropping lead balls from the Nieuwe Kerk in the Dutch city of Delft. The experiment is considered a foundational moment in the history of statics, which Stevin's work helped to codify.

== History ==
In the late 16th century, increasing interest in physics resulted in a number of European scientists conducting experiments into the intricacies of the scientific field. Many of these experiments were—directly or indirectly—presenting a challenge to the laws of physics formulated by Aristotle, whose theory was then the dominant school of thought in Europe. While most contemporaneous scientific experimentation was undertaken by Italian scholars, by the 1580s new ideas on physics had proliferated to the rest of Europe.

One of the European scientists to embrace the new view of physics was Simon Stevin, a Flemish engineer and mathematician. Stevin was employed as a military adviser for the court of William the Silent, and as such resided in the city of Delft while William's government occupied the city; one of Stevin's main benefactors was Maurice, Prince of Orange, whose patronage allowed Stevin to further his scientific interests. While Stevin's primary concern at court was the design of defensive fortifications, he also took interest in fluid dynamics, designing a series of improvements for Delft's windmills. To gain permission to tinker with Delft's mills, Stevin employed the services of Jan Cornets de Groot, a local lawyer and future father of legal scholar Hugo de Groot. The elder De Groot and Stevin became friends, with the former eventually investing in several new mills built using Stevin's design.

In 1586 Stevin and De Groot collaborated to perform an experiment intended to challenge Aristotle's theory that objects fall at a speed directly proportional to their mass. To conduct their experiment, the two carried a pair of identically-sized lead balls up the Nieuwe Kerk in Delft before dropping them onto a wooden platform 30 feet below; of the pair, one ball was ten times heavier than the other. When the balls were dropped, both spheres hit the wooden platform below at substantively the same time, indicating that objects of the same size fall at the same speed regardless of mass. Stevin concluded that Aristotle's theory was therefore incorrect.

While the Delft tower experiment had been a success, it was not conducted with the same scientific rigor that later experiments were; Stevin lacked an instrument to accurately measure the speed of the falling spheres, and was forced to rely on audio feedback (caused by the spheres impacting the wooden platform below) and eyewitness accounts to deduce that the balls had fallen at the same speed. As such, the experiment staged at the Nieuwe Kerk was given less credence than similar experiments, namely the more substantive work of Galileo Galilei and his famous thought experiment at the Leaning Tower of Pisa in 1589.

Stevin published his findings in his 1586 work De Beghinselen Der Weeghconst ("The Principles of the Art of Weighing"). Stevin and De Groot's experiment is—along with those of their Italian contemporaries—considered to be one of the foundational experiments in the history of modern statics.

== See also ==
- Galileo's Leaning Tower of Pisa experiment
