= Vrijenban =

Coordinates: 52°1′5″N 4°21′47″E

- Neighborhood of Delft and Former Municipality
- Coat of arms

- Vrijenban is shown in red within the current boundaries of Delft
- Country: Netherlands
- Province: South Holland
- Settled: 1700s

Vrijenban is a neighborhood of Delft in the Netherlands province of South Holland. It is located on the northeast boundary of the historic city center of Delft. Prior to being merged into Delft, Vrijenban used to be a municipality in its own right.

== History ==
Vrijenban was a settlement of people before 1795 when it began to be organized into a place and take some structure. From 1795 to 1798 it was a municipality and from 1798 to 1811 it was a Dutch "gemeente." In 1812, the "gemeente" of Vrijenban became part of Delft. Later it again gained some self-rule. The municipality was established in 1817. In 1833, the municipality of Biesland was merged into Vrijenban. In 1855 Abtsregt was also merged into Vrijenban.

In 1921, it became part of Delft. At that time, a small portion of the former area of Vrijenban was given to Pijnacker. The remaining area of Vrijenban is less than the original area.

The city hall of Vrijenban stands at the beginning of the approach to Reineveldbrug over the Schie River in the direction of Brasserskade and is now in use as an office.

== Maps ==
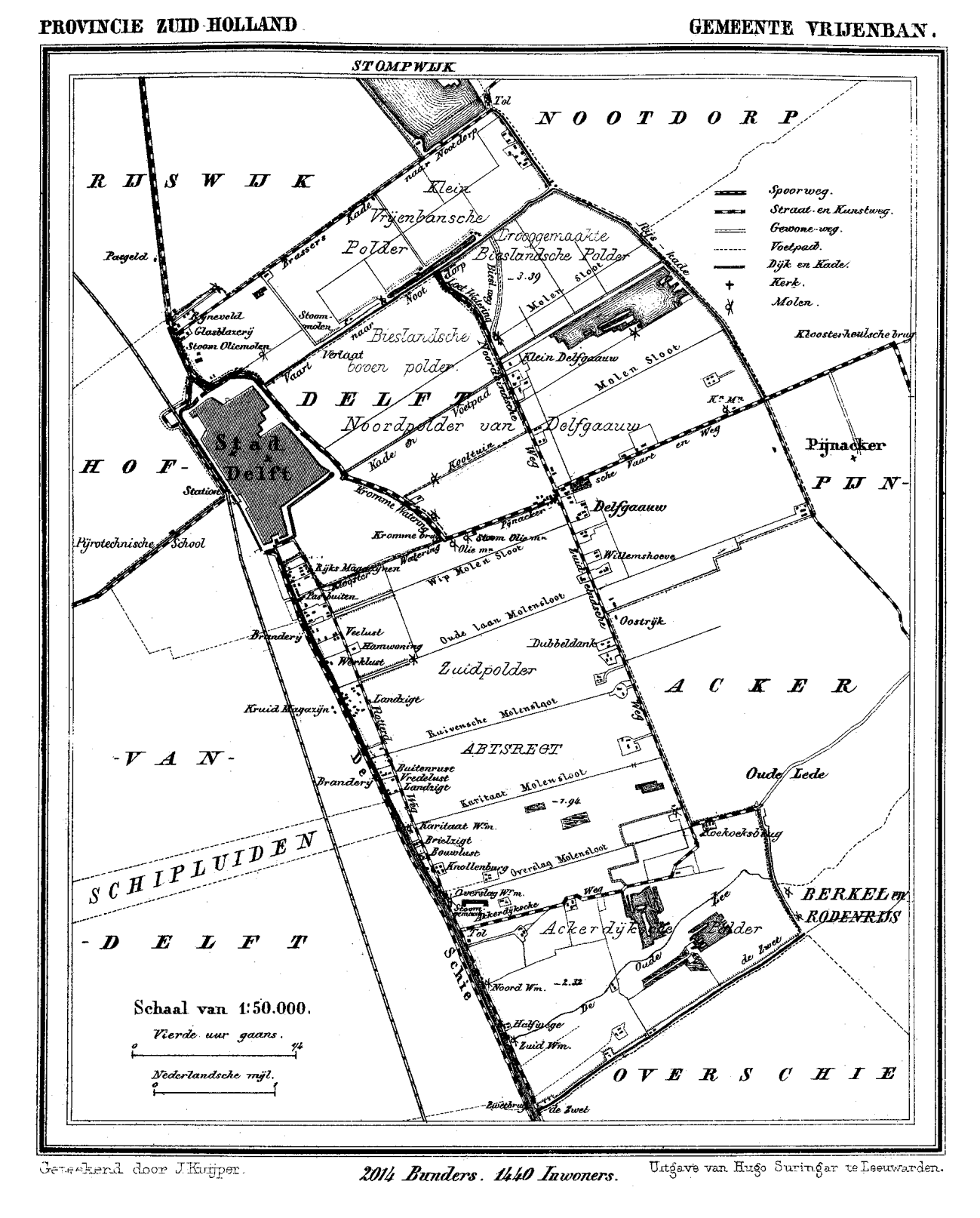
1870 map showing Vrijenban

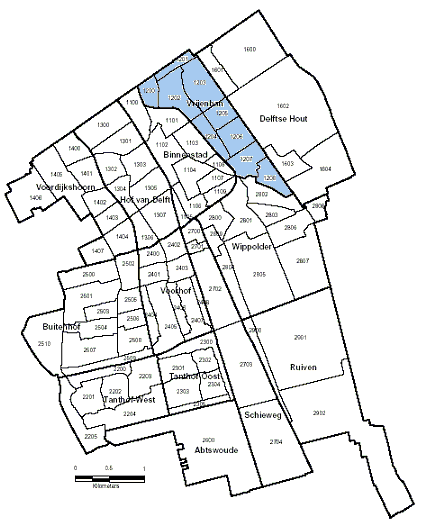
Modern map showing Vrijenban (in blue), within Delft.
