= De Beghinselen Der Weeghconst =

Book by Simon Stevin

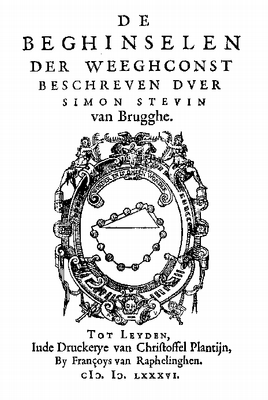
Frontpage of De Beghinselen der Weeghconst by Simon Stevin, 1586

De Beghinselen der Weeghconst (lit. "The Principles of the Art of Weighing") is a book about statics written by the Flemish physicist Simon Stevin in Dutch. It was published in 1586 in a single volume with De Weeghdaet (lit. "The Act of Weighing"), De Beghinselen des Waterwichts ("The Principles of Hydrostatics") and an Anhang (an appendix). In 1605, there was another edition.

== Importance ==
The importance of the book was summarized by the Encyclopædia Britannica:

In De Beghinselen der Weeghconst (1586; “Statics and Hydrostatics”) Stevin published the theorem of the triangle of forces. The knowledge of this triangle of forces, equivalent to the parallelogram diagram of forces, gave a new impetus to the study of statics, which had previously been founded on the theory of the lever. He also discovered that the downward pressure of a liquid is independent of the shape of its vessel and depends only on its height and base.

== Contents ==
The first part consists of two books, together account for 95 pages, here divided into 10 pieces.

=== Book I ===
Start: panegyrics, Mission to Rudolf II, Uytspraeck Vande Weerdicheyt of Duytsche Tael, Cortbegryp Bepalinghen and Begheerten (definitions and assumptions)

Proposal 1 t / m 4: hefboomwet
Proposal 5 t / m 12: a balance with weights pilaer
Proposition 13 t / m 18: follow-up, with hefwicht, two supports
Proposition 19: balance on an inclined plane, with cloot Crans
Proposal 20 t / m 28: pilaer with scheefwichten, hanging, body

=== Book II ===
Proposal 1 t / m 6: center of gravity boards – triangle, rectilinear flat
Proposal 7 t / m 13: trapezium, divide, cut fire
Proposition 14 t / m 24: center of gravity of bodies – pillar, pyramid, burner
The Weeghdaet
The Beghinselen des Waterwichts
Anhang
Byvough

== See also ==
- Simon Stevin
