= Lēdurga =

Village in Latvia

- Anthem: Lapu upe Lēdurga
- Coordinates: 57°19′17″N 24°44′22″E
- Country: Latvia
- Municipality: Sigulda Municipality
- Parish: Lēdurga Parish
- Highest elevation: 60 m (200 ft)

Population (10.02.2022.)
  - Total: 555
- Time zone: UTC+2

Lēdurga is a village and the center of Lēdurga Parish, Sigulda Municipality in the Vidzeme region of Latvia. The village is located on both sides of the river Aģe, 18 km away from the municipality of Ragana and 64 km from Riga, the capital of Latvia. Lēdurga consists of parish administration, elementary school, House of Culture, sport center, Lēdurga's Lutheran church, dendrological park and open-air stage. Lēdurga is the birthplace of the Baltic German activist and writer Garlieb Merkel, the author of Die Letten ("The Latvians"), the book which first drew attention to the Latvians as more than just peasants.

== History ==
Lēdurga (Letthegore, Lettegore, Ledegore) was first mentioned in the Livonian Chronicle of Henry in connection with events in the spring of the year 1211, when the Ridalians and the people of Saaremaa destroyed Bishop Albert's Livonian lands, including Lēdurga. William of Modena, the papal legate, conducted Christian worship for Livonians in the village church in 1225. Lēdurga was joined with Turaida in a single Lēdurga-Turaida congregation municipality in 1589. The village is formed around the center of the former Lēdurga manor ("Loddiger"). In 1932 Lēdurga obtained densely populated village status.

== Education ==
The elementary school was established in 1871. On 21 July 1998 the school was renamed the Garlieb Merkel Elementary School to honor the Baltic German writer Garlieb Helwig Merkel since Lēdurga was his birthplace in 1769. The school has its own flag, symbol, and song by J. Ozoliņa and L. Niklase titled Skolas Gadi ("School years").

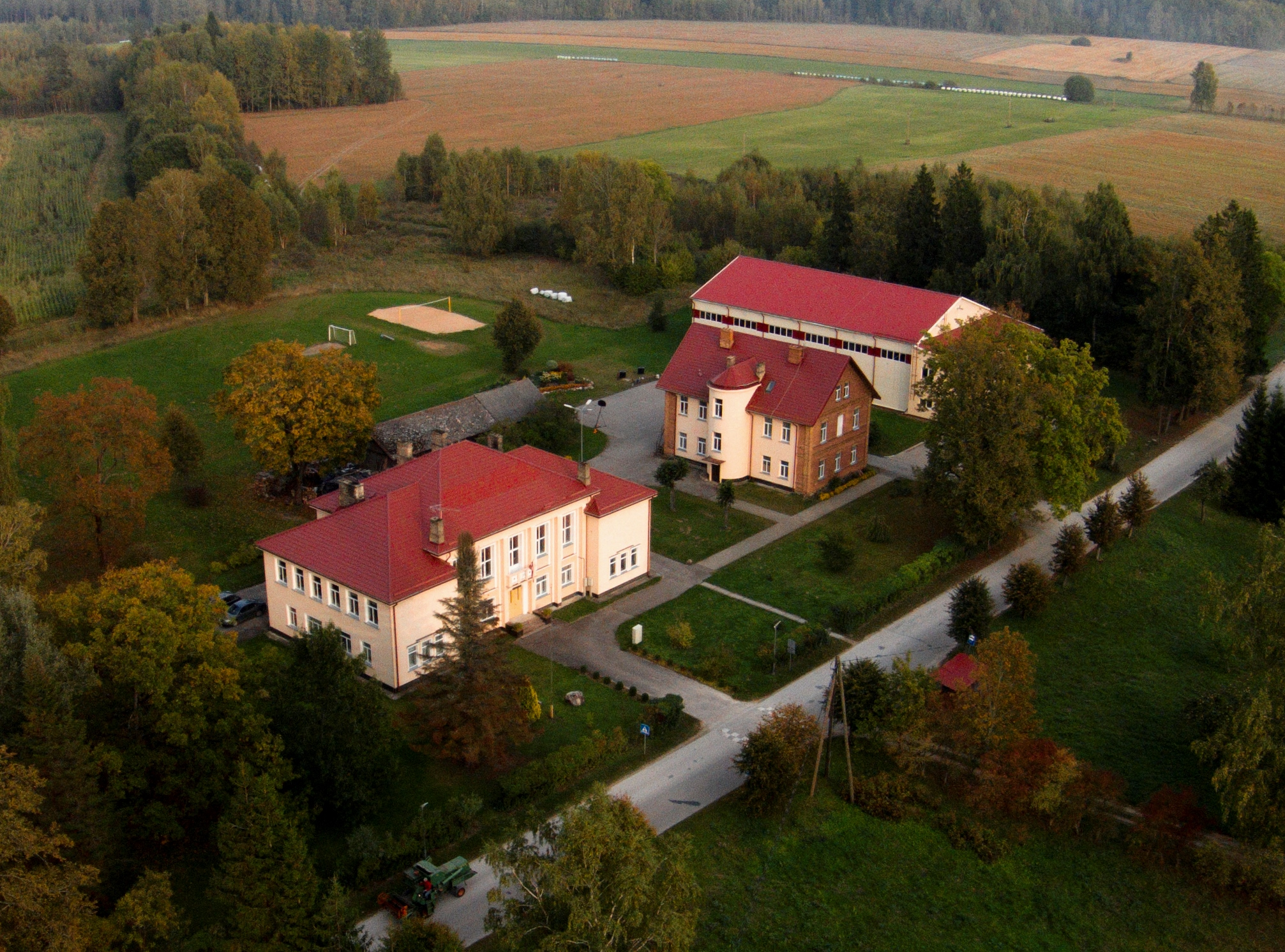
Garlieb Merkel Elementary School with sports hall on the far right and volleyball court in the background

== Nature ==
=== Waters ===
The River Aģe flows through the middle of the village, starting from the nearby Lake Aģe and ending in the Baltic Sea, near the city of Skulte. In the old days, the Aģe was used as an internal traffic and trade route. In the 13th century, the Livonian Chronicle of Henry mentioned the Aģe under the name of Adya (Livonian for "edge") in stories about Livonian battles against German intruders. In the village center next to the Lēdurga manor house, a dam was built, forming a pond that in the past was used for running the watermill. The watermill buildings and dams are still preserved but no longer in use.

=== Lēdurga dendrological park ===
Lēdurga dendrological park was established in 1973 by one person, Arvīds Janitens (1923–2009). A short documentary about him and the park was made in Latvian. In 1993 dendrologists of the National Botanical Garden recognized 939 tree and bush species and varieties, but currently, the number exceeds a thousand. Many events such as Walpurgis Night, Easter, Midsummer eve and others are celebrated in the park.

== Culture ==
=== The house of culture ===
Lēdurga's house of culture was built in 1973. In the same year the building was burned down by an accidental fire. Reconstruction took 9 years. In 1981 the heating in the building was provided and the first kolkhoz "Draudzība" ("Friendship") events took place. The official opening took place on 29 May 1982. Previous managers were Karolis Treijs, Baiba Adamoviča, Didzis Trūbs, Dzintra Sapule, Mareks Motte; from January 2007 the manager has been Ilze Runce. Many amateur collectives practise and perform in the building: traditional dance groups, choirs, and the folklore band "Putni".

=== Folklore band "Putni" ===
The folklore band "Putni" ("Birds") is based in Lēdurga's house of culture. Singers, musicians, dancers, and storytellers practise their ethnic culture and traditional performing arts. Participants are aged between 3 and 50, joining together many generations. "Putni" is widely known in the whole of Latvia. During their performances, historical costumes from the 12th century are always worn. The costumes are handmade by the band members and their leader Ilze Kļaviņa.

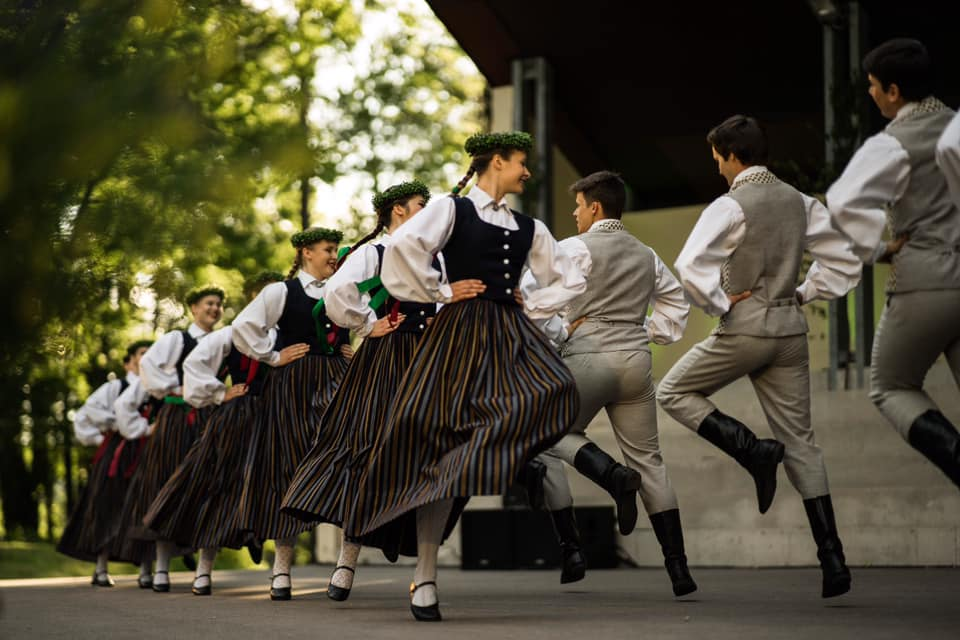
Dance group JDK Metieniņš from Lēdurga's house of culture at a concert on the open-air stage 4 June 2019
