= Slavery in Latvia =

Slavery in Latvia refer to the history of slavery in the area that was later to form the nation of Latvia.

There is little information about slavery among the Ancient Latvians. The Baltics were however a center of an Ancient slave trade Southward toward the Ancient Black Sea slave trade, which provided slaves to the Mediterranean Sea and the Middle East. The Baltic peoples were often subjected to slave raids and used as a supply source of slaves. Among those attacking and enslaving the Baltics were the vikings.

However, the Baltics also participated in the slave trade themselves. When the vikings became Christian in the 11th century and discontinued their slave trade of European captives to the Middle East via the Baltic Sea and the Black Sea, it was taken over by the Baltic tribes. The Baltic slave trade took slaves from local tribal warfare as well as piracy, which they sold to the Kievan Rus, who trafficked them to the Black Sea and the Central Asia toward the Middle East.

In the 13th century, the Latvian peasantry were subjected to serfdom under the Baltic German nobility until the 19th century.

== History ==
=== Before Christianization ===
There is limited information about the institution of slavery in Latvia or Livonia prior to the Christianization during the Livonian Crusade and the conquest of Latvia by the Livonian Brothers of the Sword and the establishment of the Terra Mariana and the State of the Teutonic Order in the 13th century. Slavery is however confirmed to have existed among the Pagan Baltic Livonians, although the institution of slavery in Baltic slavery is not believed to have been significant.

The slavery among the Livonians is noted by the Germans, who referred to the slaves in Livonia as drell (thrall). The slaves mentioned by the Germans appear to have been war captives taken during warfare and then enslaved.

=== Slave trade ===
While slavery as such does not appear to have played a big role in Ancient Baltic society, the slave trade appear to have played a bigger role. Instead of keeping the captives taken during slave raids in slavery in their own society, the Baltic people in Livonia appear more often to have sold their captives on. The Baltics appears to have been a center of slave trade, as well as a slave supply source, already during antiquity.

The role of the Baltics in the European slave trade is more documented during the middle ages. In the middle ages, the Baltics became a religious border zone as one of the last remaining Pagan areas in Christian Europe. This was significant in the context of the slave trade, since both Christians and Muslims banned the enslavement of people of their own religion, but Pagans were viewed a legitimate targets of enslavement for sale to both Christians and Pagans, which made them the most lucrative choice for slave trade. Up until the Christianization of the Baltics in the 13th century, therefore, the Baltic people were viewed as legitimate targets of slave trade from the surrounding slave traders, such as the vikings from the West and the Rus of the Kievan Rus' slave trade from the East.

Since both Christians and Muslims banned the enslavement of people of their own faith but viewed pagans as legitimate targets for slavery, the pagans of northeastern Europe became highly targeted by the slave traders when the rest of Europe had become Christian by the 12th century. The pagan Lithuanians, Latvians, Estonians, Livonians, and Latgallians raided each other, Ingria and Novgorod during the 12th- and 13th-centuries, and sold war captives south to the Black Sea slave trade.

However, the Baltics were not only a victim of slave raids as a slave supply source by foreign slave traders; they were also an Ancient center of slave trade themselves. When the Norse Vikings became Christian and ended their piracy in the 11th century, they were succeeded by pagan pirates from the Baltics, who raided the coasts of the Baltic Sea, such as now Christian Sweden and Finland, for slaves. When the Viking slave trade stopped in the mid 11th century, the old slave trade route between the Baltic Sea and the Black Sea and Central Asia via the Russian rivers was upheld by Pagan Baltic slave traders, who sold slaves via Daugava to the Black Sea and East, which was now the only remaining slave trade in Europe after the slave market in Western Europe had died out in the 12th century. In the 13th century, the Latvian reportedly had found slave trade to be so lucrative that many used it has their main income.

The Baltic slave trade ended after conquest of the Baltic by the Teutonic order during the 13th century.

=== Serfdom ===
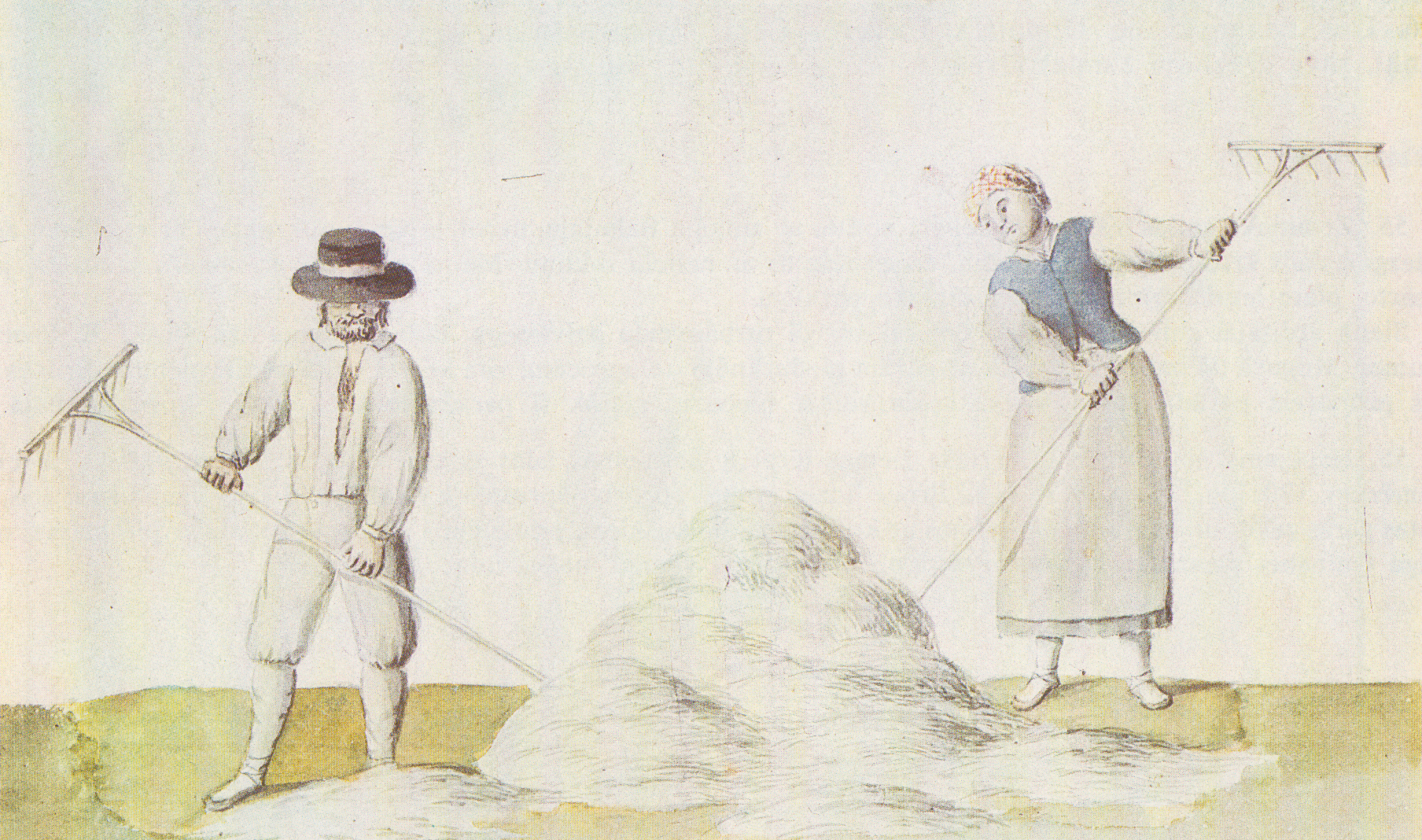
Latvian peasant couple working, 18–19th century

After the conquest of the Teutonic order and the establishment of the Terra Mariana and the State of the Teutonic Order (1201–1561) in the 13th century, the Baltic peasantry, were subjected to serfdom under the Baltic German nobility.

Technically, serfdom in Latvia were not defined as chattel slavery. In practice, however, serfdom transformed in to de facto slavery, during which individual serfs could be bought and sold.

The Livonian peasant law of 1804 banned the landowners from buying and selling individual serfs. Serfdom in Latvia was abolished in Courland in 1819 and in Livonia in 1820.

== See also ==
- Abolition of serfdom in Livonia
