= Abolition of serfdom in Livonia =

Laws for Russian Empire Livonia Province

Livonian Peasants' Laws were laws introduced in the 19th century for Governorate of Livonia of the Russian Empire. Around the same time, similar laws were enacted in all Baltic governorates and Duchy of Courland and Semigallia. These laws changed and clarified peasants' rights and obligations, who ethnically were mainly Estonians and Latvians. This development culminated in Peasant Community Code of 1866 which codified peasants self-governance.

== Background ==
In the Livonian Confederation, farmers living in the castle districts retained personal freedom and self-government, but were forced to perform military and civilian duties and pay taxes. After the devastation caused by the Livonian War, the political influence and power of the manor owners increased over the peasants. After the Duchy of Livonia and Duchy of Courland and Semigallia came under the rule of the Polish-Lithuanian Commonwealth, most peasants lost their personal freedom and became the "movable" property of the nobles. However, personal freedom was maintained by free peasants (Vidzeme leimans and Curonian Kings), as well as city residents. The Curonian Kings was the inhabitants of seven villages of Kurzeme (Ķoniņi, Pliķi, Kalēju, Ziemeļu, Viesalga, Sausgaļi and Dragūnai), who had received special county books from masters of the Livonian Order. In legal terms, the royals were no different from the nobles, they did not pay regular dues and did not comply with the clauses, and they were the complete determinants of the land they cultivated themselves or with the help of paid labor. Like the nobles, the Curonian Kings had the rights of fishing, hunting, own and use mills, as well as their own coats of arms.

At a time of Swedish Livonia (1629—1721) in 1681 King Charles XI proposed an abolition of serfdom in Livonia however Ritterschaft of Livland considered it as infringement on their rights in regards to peasants: domestic discipline, ownership of the peasants, and right to keep peasants on their land. Since Livonian nobility provided much needed resources to support Sweden's wars it had sufficient leverage to maintain laws and social order as they see fit.

Once Livonia, Estonia and Duchy of Courland and Semigallia became part of Russian Empire local voices for abolition of serfdom emerged. Among the first were pastor Johann Georg Eisen von Schwarzenberg and Garlieb Merkel.

In 1794, Garlieb Merkel advocated abolition of serfdom in Livonia and Estonia in his influential book German: Die Letten vorzüglich in Liefland am Ende des philosophischen Jahrhunderts, Ein Beytrag zur Völker- und Menschenkunde ("The Admirable Latvians of Livonia at the end of the Century of Philosophy, with an Addendum on Peoples and Anthropology") which was promptly translated into French, Danish and Russian.

Russian Empress Catherine the Great had annulled an act by Peter III that essentially freed the serfs belonging to the Orthodox Church. She also tried to take away serfs right to petition her. Far away from the capital, serfs were confused as to the circumstances of her accession to the throne. Pugachev's Rebellion of 1774 pushed Empress away from the idea of serf liberation. During Catherine's reign (1762–1796), despite her enlightened ideals, the serfs were generally unhappy and discontented.

Among other factors Baltic German nobility was more willing to abolish serfdom than Russian nobility and thus Baltic governorates became the testing ground for entire Russian Empire.

== Livonian Peasants Act of 1804 ==
In October 1802, widespread Kauguri riots took place in the vicinity of Valmiera, which were suppressed only by troops. After investigating the causes of the peasant uprising, new peasants' laws were issued in 1804, which determined that the peasants were attributed to the manor's parish and not to the landowner. The law determined the status of farmers, and the court system was reformed (parish court, land court, criminal court). In addition, in 1809, "Additional Points to the Farmers' Law" were issued.

In 1805, this law also came into force for the peasants of the Governorate of Estonia. Livonian Peasants Act of 1804 in effect replaced serfdom with villeinage. Similar law was enacted with Estonian Peasants Act of 1804.

== Livonian Peasants' Act of 1819 ==
Analogous Peasantry Laws were approved by Landtags (Diet of knighthood) of the governorate of Estonia in 1816, governorate of Courland in 1817 and the governorate of Livonia in 1819 and then all has been confirmed by emperor Alexander I of Russia. 23 May 1816 the Livonian Peasant Law was adopted and came into force in 1819, abolishing serfdom; the peasantry could also acquire real estate; financial leasing was introduced as a burden. Peasant communities were to create municipalities.

=== Garlieb Merkel economic study ===
After the War of 1812 and the French invasion of Kurzeme, Emperor Alexander I established a commission to improve the legal status of the peasants in Kurzeme. In 1814, Garlieb Merkel submitted an economic study on the benefits of employing free peasants as opposed to the work of commoners to the tender announced by the Free Economic Society, which justified the abolition of serfdom in the Baltic provinces.

After a long debate, in April 1817, the Landtag of Kurzeme adopted a decision on the release of the peasants, which was approved on 25 August 1817 and announced at a solemn ceremony in the presence of Emperor Alexander I on 30 August 1818 in Jelgava. The Kurzeme Farmers' Release Law formally gave personal freedom and freedom of movement to 300,000 people. On 26 March 1819 a similar law was approved by Vidzeme Landtag, it was promulgated on 1 June 1820 1820 in Riga and Sāmsala. However, the abolition of marital status took place gradually, the so-called temporary status was established. With the release of the farmers, a change in the lowest administrative structure was also envisaged.

After the release, for 3 years the farmers were not allowed to leave the boundaries of their parish district, but for the next 3 – the boundaries of the district of the mayor (in Kurzeme) or the boundaries of the district of the lord (Vidzeme). Only in 1832 did Jurģi farmers gained the right to change their place of residence within the boundaries of their province, but in Kurzeme until 1848, farmers were not allowed to settle in cities.

After the release of the peasants in 1820, Merkel published an essay dedicated to Alexander I, "Free Latvians and Estonians". For this, as well as for other works dedicated to the release of peasants, the monarch granted the author a lifetime pension of 300 silver rubles.

== Livonian Peasants' Act of 1849 ==
The Livonian Peasants' Law of 1849 came into force 1850. from the autumn of 1849, after publication in Estonian and Latvian.

The law confirmed that the entire land was the property of the manor, but determined how it was to be used. That part of the land which had hitherto been at the disposal of the peasants was declared farmland, the use of which was in accordance with the free contract. It could be rented out as viable farms, preferably for money or sold to the peasants for real.

=== Other law provisions ===
The law also regulated compulsory schooling. The maintenance of the schools remained the responsibility of the municipalities, with Lutherans having to bear their own and Orthodox their own schools. A new link for the management of Lutheran peasant schools was the parish school government, which included a landowner, pastor, a parish school teacher and one municipality judges. The management of the Orthodox schools remained the responsibility of the Orthodox Church and the Synod.

== See also ==
- Latvian Land Reform of 1920
- Abolition of serfdom in Poland
- Abolition of serfdom in Russia
- Estonian Peasant Laws
- Saaremaa Peasant Laws
- Slavery in Latvia
- Slavery in Estonia
