= List of Crimean–Nogai slave raids in Eastern Europe =

This is a list of Crimean–Nogai slave raids in Eastern Europe.

Overviews of Crimean–Nogai slave raids on Eastern Europe
Name	Date	Location	Perpetrators	Casualties	Notes
Siege of Kiev (1416)	June 1416	Kiev and other cities of the Kiev region	Golden Horde		Attackers led by Edigu plundered Kiev, but did not take Kiev Castle.
First Tatar raid on Ukraine	1447	Ukraine	Crimean Khanate		the Hustyn Chronicle of 1447 reports the beginning of destructive attacks by Crimean Tatars on Ukraine.
Tatar raid on Ukraine	1471	Ukraine	Crimean Khanate		The destructive Tatar attack on Ukraine.
Tatar raid on Ukraine	1479	Ukraine	Crimean Khanate		The destructive Tatar attack on Ukraine.
Tatar raid on Podolia	1480	Podolia	Crimean Khanate		Mengli I Giray ravages Podolia.
Siege of Kiev (1482)	1 September 1482	Kiev	Crimean Khanate	Most were taken prisoner	Tatars led by the Crimean khan Mengli I Giray attacked the Kiev region at the request of Moscow's Ivan III. The attackers captured Kiev and the city castle. Kiev voivode Ivan Chodkiewicz and his family were taken prisoner.
Tatar raid on Kiev and Podolia	1487	Kiev, Podolia	Crimean Khanate		Attack by a 5,000-strong Tatar army on the Kiev and Podolia. In September, King John I Albert defeated them in the Battle of Kopystrzyn. There were 1,500 attackers killed in the battle, and many Tatars were taken prisoner.
Fire of Kiev	1489	Kiev	Crimean Khanate	many houses burned down	A 100,000-strong Tatar army marches into Podolia and Kiev. Kiev is stormed and burned.
Tatar raid on Podolia, Galicia and Volhynia	1490–1491	Podolia, Eastern Galicia, Volhynia	Crimean Khanate	many prisoners	The campaign of the Crimean and Nogai Tatars in Podolia, Galicia and Volhynia. Volodymyr and other Volhynian towns were burned. A large number of prisoners(yasyr) were taken. On 25 January 1491, the Polish-Lithuanian army under the command of Lwów castellan Mikołaj Chodecki and Luck starosta Semyon Olshanski defeated a 9,000-strong Tatar detachment returning with booty near Zasław, on the Goryn River, and liberated the prisoners.
Tatar raid on Kiev and Czernihów	1493	Kiev, Czernihów	Crimean Khanate		Attack of the Tatars under the leadership of Khan Mengli I Giray on Kiev and Czernihów.
Tatar raid on Podolia and Volhynia	1494	Podolia, Volhynia	Crimean Khanate	Many prisoners taken	Tatars attacked Podolia and Volhynia. Many prisoners were taken. The Polish-Lithuanian army pursuing the attackers was defeated in the Battle of Wyszniowiec.
Tatar raid on Volhynia	1495	Volhynia	Crimean Khanate		Tatars attacked Volhynia under the leadership of Mengli I Khan's son Giray. The Lithuanian army under the leadership of the Luck starosta Semyon Olshanski defeated some of the attackers who besieged the city of Koreс. In retaliation, the Tatars launched a second campaign in Volhynia under the command of the khan's sons. Golshansky, together with the governor of Volodymyr, Wasyl Hreptowicz, and Michał and Kostantin Ostrogski, held the defence in Rivne Castle. The Tatars laid siege to the city of Rivne, but failed to capture the castle.
Ottoman-Tatar raid on Galicia	22 April 1498	Eastern Galicia	Ottoman Empire; Crimean Khanate		22 April: The first and extremely devastating attack by Tatars and Turks on Galicia.

== See also ==
- Battle of Blue Waters
- Battle of the Vorskla River
- Crimean Khanate
- Crimean slave trade

== Literature and sources ==
- Baysar A.L. Crimea. Essays on Historical, Natural and Social Geography: a textbook / A. L. Baitzar; Ivan Franko National University of Lviv - Lviv: Ivan Franko National University of Lviv Publishing Centre, 2007. 224 p.
- Hrushevsky M.S. History of Ukraine-Rus'. Vol. 7. - Kyiv-Lviv, 1909. - 628 p.
- The great history of Ukraine: In 2 volumes. - Vol. I. / Foreword by Dr I. Krypyakevych. - Kyiv: Globus, 1993. - 352 с. ISBN 5-86248-016-1
