= Garlieb Merkel =

Baltic German writer and publicist

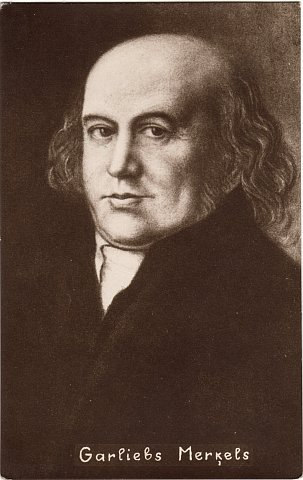
- Born: Garlieb Helwig Merkel; 21 October 1769; Lēdurga Parish, Kreis Riga, Governorate of Livonia, Russian Empire (Now Sigulda Municipality, Latvia)
- Died: 27 April 1850 (aged 80); Katlakalns Parish, Governorate of Livonia, Russian Empire (Now Ķekava Municipality, Latvia)
- Occupation: Writer
- Writing career
- Period: 19th. century
- Notable work: Die Letten
- Literary movement: Enlightenment

Garlieb Helwig Merkel (1 November [O.S. 21 October] 1769 in Lēdurga Parish (now Sigulda Municipality), Kreis Riga – 9 May [O.S. 27 April] 1850 in Riga) was a Baltic German writer and activist and an early Estophile and Lettophile.

Merkel was born into the family of a rural priest in what is today Latvia. From the age of 17 he worked as a tutor for upper-class German families. In 1790, he joined the circle of Riga intellectuals. Influenced by the ideas he found there, he published the book Die Letten ("Latvians", full title: Die Letten vorzüglich in Liefland am Ende des philosophischen Jahrhunderts, Ein Beytrag zur Völker- und Menschenkunde ("The Admirable Latvians of Livonia at the end of the Century of Philosophy, with an Addendum on Peoples and Anthropology")) in 1796, which described in the darkest terms the life of the Latvian peasantry and the atrocities of the Baltic German landowners and called upon the Imperial Russian government to intervene and ameliorate the lot of the Latvians. The book gained considerable popularity in the German society and was translated into French, Danish and Russian. In 1800, the original German version of the book was re-published. Finally, in the 20th century it was translated also into Latvian.

Merkel's book caused a storm of anger among the landowners of Governorate of Livonia, and Merkel was forced into exile. He moved to Weimar, then in 1800 to Berlin, where he was the co-editor with August von Kotzebue of the weekly Der Freimutige (1803–1806).

In 1816, Merkel returned to Livonia. He published the book My Ten Years in Germany (1818) and Images and Characters from My Life (two volumes, 1839–1840). He also wrote the pamphlet Free Latvians and Estonians (1820), which was published in Leipzig.

A street is named in his honor in downtown Riga.

== See also ==
- Abolition of serfdom in Livonia
