= Nafisa al-Bayda =

Egyptian diplomat and philanthropist

Nafisa al-Bayda (fl. 1768 - 1816), was the wife of the Egyptian Mamluk leaders Ali Bey al-Kabir and Murad Bey. She has been referred to as the most famous Mamluk woman in 18th-century Egypt. She was a successful business financier and philanthropist, but is most known for her diplomatic service as the mediator between Murad Bey and the French occupation forces of Napoleon Bonaparte in 1798–1801.

== Life ==
=== Origin ===
Her origin is unknown, but she is referred to as a "white slave", which was a common origin for the slave concubines and wives of the Mamluk aristocrats of Egypt. The Mamluk aristocrats, who were themselves of white origin (often Circassian or from Georgia), preferred to marry women of similar ethnicity, while black slave women were used as domestic maids. The white slave women bought to become concubines and wives of the Mamluks were often from the Caucasus, Circassians or Georgian, who were sold to slave traders by their poor parents (via the Black Sea slave trade), and Nafisa al-Bayda is believed to have had the same background.

=== Ali Bey al-Kabir ===
Nafisa al-Bayda was bought to the harem of the Mamluk leader Ali Bey al-Kabir in Cairo. She is described as the favorite concubine of Ali Bey, who eventually manumitted her and married her. This was a normal background for the wife of a Mamluk, who either married the daughters of their peers or their own slave concubines, which was also a normal custom for elite men in most of the Islamic world. In 1768, Ali Bey al-Kabir temporarily took Egypt from the Ottoman Empire and became its ruler. In 1773, she became a widow.

=== Murad Bey ===
As a widow, Nafisa al-Bayda remarried the Mamluk leader Murad Bey. It was a common custom within the Egyptian Mamluk elite to establish valuable alliances and connections by marrying the widows or concubines of other Mamluks. The marriage between Murad Bey and Nafisa al-Bayda, widow of Ali Bey, was an example of this marriage policy, similar to that of Shawikar Qadin, the concubine of Uthman Katkhuda (d. 1736), who were given in marriage by Abd al-Rahman Jawish to Ibrahum Katkhuda (d. 1754) after the death of Uthman Katkhuda. The second spouse of Nafisa al-Bayda, Murad Bey, was the Ottoman governor of Egypt in 1784–1785, and the de facto ruler of Egypt between 1791 and 1798.

In 1798, Egypt was invaded by France under Napoleon Bonaparte. After the French victory in the Battle of the Pyramids, Murad Bey fled to organize the resistance against the French. Nafisa al-Bayda remained in Cairo during the French occupation. She acted as a mediator between her absent spouse and the French merchant community of Cairo, as well as a diplomatic mediator between the French occupation force and Murad Bey.

When she was widowed by the death of Murad Bey in 1801, she used her position as a diplomatic mediator with the French to secure that the property of her dead spouse would not be confiscated by the French. She invited Napoleon Bonaparte himself to her home to negotiate, and he imposed a big tribute.

=== Business activity ===
In accordance with Islamic law, Nafisa al-Bayda was permitted to control her own money despite being a married woman. As was common for the women of the Mamluk aristocracy of Egypt, she engaged in business in the form of investments, a form of business which could be managed at a distance from within the seclusion of a harem, and became a successful and rich business investor.

She followed the example of many other aristocratic Mamluk women and participated in charity. Her most known charitable project was the foundation of a building that combines a water dispensary with a school for orphans, the Sabil-Kuttub Nafisa al-Bayda, which was founded near Bab Zuwayla in Cairo in 1796.
