= Lēdurga Parish =

Parish of Latvia

- parish of Latvia
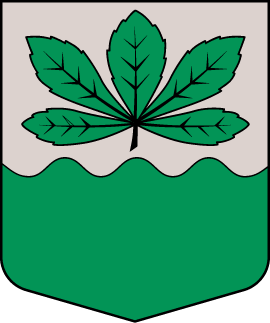
- Coat of arms

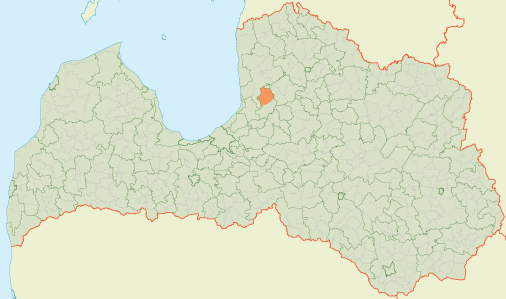
- Coordinates: 57°19′19″N 24°46′45″E
- Country: Latvia

Population (1 January 2026)
  - Total: 1,214

Lēdurga Parish (Latvian: Lēdurgas pagasts) is an administrative unit of Sigulda Municipality in the Vidzeme region of Latvia.
