= Black Sea slave trade =

The Black Sea slave trade trafficked people across the Black Sea from Eastern Europe and the Caucasus to slavery in the Mediterranean and the Middle East. The Black Sea slave trade was a center of the slave trade between Europe and the rest of the world from antiquity until the 19th century. One of the major and most significant slave trades of the Black Sea region was the trade of the Crimean Khanate, known as the Crimean slave trade.

The Black Sea is situated in a region historically dominated by the margins of empires, conquests and major trade routes between Europe, the Mediterranean and Central Asia, notably the Ancient Silk Road, which made the Black Sea ideal for a slave trade of war captives sold along the trade routes.

In the Early Middle Ages, the Byzantine Empire imported slaves from the Vikings, who transported European captives via the route from the Varangians to the Greeks to the Byzantine ports at the Black Sea. In the late Middle Ages, trading colonies of Venice and Genoa along the Northern Black Sea coasts used the instable political and religious border zones to buy captives and transport them as slaves to Italy, Spain, and the Ottoman Empire.

In the early modern period, the Crimean Khanate abducted Eastern Europeans through the Crimean–Nogai slave raids in Eastern Europe, who were transported to the rest of the Muslim world in collaboration with the Ottoman slave trade from the Crimea. The massive slave trade was at this time a major source of income for the Crimean Khanate. When the Crimean slave trade was ended by the Russian conquest of the Crimea in 1783, the slave trade of Circassians from Caucasus became an independent slave trade. The Circassian slave trade of particularly women from Caucasus to the Muslim world via Anatolia and Constantinople continued until the 20th century.

== Antiquity ==
In antiquity, enslaved people were sold, via the ancient Greek and Roman city ports of the Black Sea, east to Asia via the Silk Road; and west to the ancient Mediterranean world. In antiquity, the Black Sea slave trade was often referred to as the Pontic slave trade.

=== Ancient Greek slave trade ===
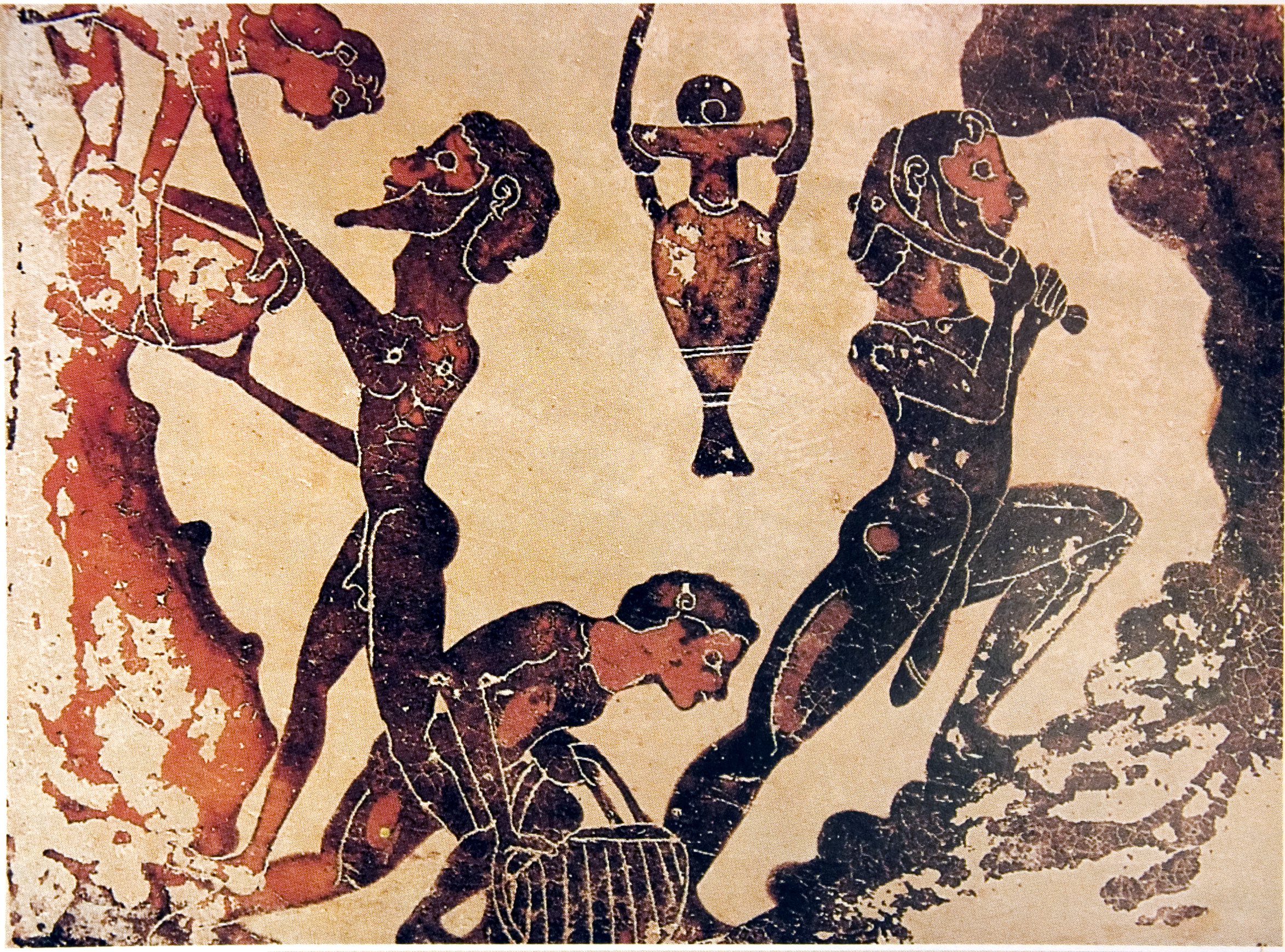
Mine workers in Greece were often slaves.

In antiquity, the Black Sea was called the Pontic Sea and people from the region often simply called Pontics. Greek colonies were established along the Black Sea, which engaged in slave trade between the tribes of the interior North of the Black Sea and the Mediterranean. Slaves were sold by their families or as war captives to the Greek cities, who exported them West to the Mediterranean or East to Asia along the Silk road.

In 594 BC, the laws of Solon outlawed the enslavement of Athenian citizens by other citizens of Athens; it was a common trend in the Greek city states to outlaw the enslavement of citizens of their own cities, and this trend made it necessary for the Greek to maintain a slave trade with non-Greek non-citizens they termed "barbarians", from foreign lands such as the Balkans or the North of the Black Sea.

In the 6th century BC, Greek city colonies expanded in the Northern shores of the Black Sea, which came to play an important role in the slave trade; it has even been hypothesized that these cities were founded because of the Black Sea slave trade. The Greek Black Sea slave trade is documented from at least the 6th century BC onward, when an inscription from Phanagoria describes the trafficking of a slave named Phaylles to Phanagoria (the Kerch Strait) from Borysthenes (Berezan by the Bug/Dnieper).

Classic Greek authors described particularly the Northwestern shore of the Black Sea as a slave coast where the conditions ensured a steady supply of slaves; it was a border zone between the Thracians and the Scythians, where the nomadic Scythians conducted slave raids against the Thracians, who were also known to sell their children to slave traders. The inhabitants up the Danube likewise traded slaves for salt. The rural lands around Greek cities were inhabited by Hellenized Scythian farmers, who acted as go-betweens and sold the slaves captured by the nomadic Scythians to the Greeks in the cities.

In the 3rd century BC, Polybius noted that the quantity of humans captured and shipped as slaves from the Northern Black Sea shores was greater than anywhere in the known world.

=== Ancient Roman slave trade ===
The Black Sea slave trade continued after the Greek Black Sea cities had become vassals of the Roman Empire, forming the Roman client state of the Bosporan Kingdom.

The Ancient Silk Road connecting Mediterranean world and China in East Asia may have existed as early as the 3rd century BC, since Chinese silk has been found in Rome has been dated to about 200 BC. The Silk Road connected to the Mediterranean world via two routes. From China, the Silk Road continued over the Tian Shan, Hami, Turpan, Almalik, Tashkent, Samarkand and finally Bukhara, where it split in two main roads: a southern route from Bukhara to Merv and from there to Antioch, Trebizond, or Aleppo; or the northern route from Bukhara over the Karakum Desert to the Caspian Sea, Astrakhan and Kazan close to the Black Sea. The Silk Road did not sell only textiles, jewels, metals, and cosmetics, but also slaves. connecting the Silk Road slave trade to the Bukhara slave trade as well as the Black Sea slave trade.

The prosperity of the Bosporan Kingdom was based on the export of wheat, fish and slaves, and the Roman Client Kingdom became the economic center of the Black Sea and called the ancient Jewel of the Black Sea.

In the 1st century, the Roman writer Strabo described Dioscurias, the major Black Sea port of the Caucasus, and the Greek city of Tanais, as major ports of the Pontic slave trade, from which "Pontic" slaves, such as Scythians or Paphlagonians, who had been sold as war captives by enemy tribes or sold by their families as adolescents, were exported to the Mediterranean and could be found in Ancient Athens.

Byzantium was a market for the Black Sea slave trade.

== Middle Ages ==
During the Middle Ages, informal slave zones were formed alongside religious borders, which were also crossed at the Black Sea region. Both Christians and Muslims banned the enslavement of people of their own faith, but both approved of the enslavement of people of a different faith.

The slave trade thus organized alongside religious principles. While Christians did not enslave Christians, and Muslims did not enslave Muslims, both did allow the enslavement of people they regarded to be heretics, which allowed Catholic Christians to enslave Orthodox Christians, and Sunni Muslims to enslave Shia Muslims.

However, both Christians and Muslims approved of enslaving pagans, who came to be a preferred target of the slave trade in the Middle Ages, and Pagan war captives were sold by pagan enemies into the slave trade.

=== Byzantine slave trade (5th–13th centuries) ===
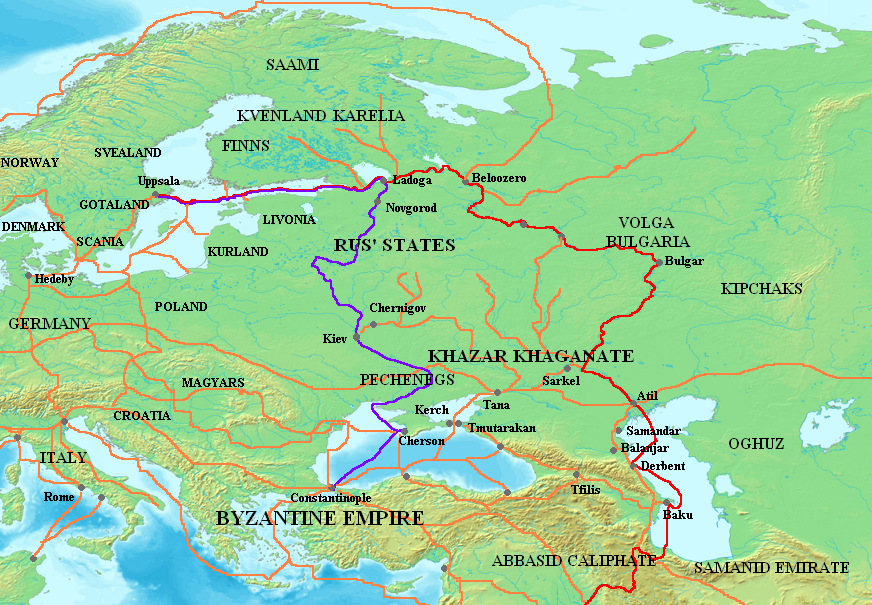
Routes through Slavic territories used for the slave trade: Volga trade route from the Vikings (Varangians) to the Muslim Middle East (red), trade route from the Varangians to the Greeks (Byzantines) (blue) – and other trade routes of the 8th–11th centuries (orange)

==== Background ====
The slave trade trafficking humans from the Black Sea region to the Mediterranean Sea during the Roman period continued during the Byzantine Empire, but the Byzantine slave trade is not fully documented, though it appears to have continued to function via the old principles war-captives and children sold by their families.

During the Middle Ages, the slave market was organized alongside religious borders. Christian slaves could not be sold in Christian slave markets, and Muslim slaves could not be sold on Muslim slave markets. The slave trade adjusted to this, and the result was that pagans, who could be sold to both Christians and Muslims, came to be highly valued. Pagans from Eastern and Northern Europe came to be the most popular targets for slavery in both the Byzantine Empire and the Islamic Arab world during the Early Middle Ages, where they were forced to convert to Christianity and Islam respectively after their enslavement.

==== Slave trade ====
Various slave routes passed via the Black Sea and the Byzantine Crimea to the Byzantine Mediterranean world and the Islamic Middle East. Different people acquired captives and shipped them down to Byzantine Crimea and other ports around the Black Sea, from where they continued to the slave market of the Mediterranean via Byzantine Constantinople, and to the Middle East.

===== Magyars of Hungary =====
The slave trade from the Balkans was mainly directed toward the Balkan slave trade of the Adriatic Sea rather than the Black Sea. However, in the 9th century, the Magyars of Hungary conducted regular slave raids toward the Slavs and sold their captives to the Byzantine slave traders in the Black Sea port of Kerch in exchange for brocades, wool, and other products.<

Ahmad ibn Rustah, a 10th-century Persian traveler, remembers it this way:

The Magyar country (Etelköz) is rich in wood and water. The land is well watered and harvests abundant. They lord over all the Slavs who neighbour them and impose a heavy tribute on them. These Slavs are completely at their mercy, like prisoners. The Magyars are Pagans, worshipping fire. They make piratical raids on the Slavs and follow the coast [of the Black Sea] with their captives to a port in Byzantine territory named Karkh.

===== Viking slave trade =====
The Vikings trafficked European slaves captured in Viking raids in Eastern Europe in two destinations from present-day Russia via the Volga trade route; one to Abbasid Caliphate in the Middle East—through the Caspian Sea, the Samanid slave trade and Iran. The other route led to the Byzantine Empire and the Mediterranean via the Dnieper and the Black Sea slave trade. During the eighth to tenth centuries, slaves from Eastern Europe and the Baltic Sea were traded to elite households in Byzantium and the Islamic world via the Dnieper and Volga river systems, the Carolingian Empire and Venice. One of the reasons Kievan Rus came to be was that Scandinavian settlers established themselves and traded with captured slaves. Arabic merchants from the Caspian Sea and Byzantine merchants from the Black Sea brought their goods to the trade markets in Rus, where they met the Viking traders and warriors known as Varangians, and traded their goods for the slaves captured by the Vikings in Eastern Europe.

The so-called saqaliba, which was the term for white slaves in the Islamic Middle East (often provided by the Vikings), is not likely to stand for exclusively Slavic ethnicity in practice, since many victims of the Vikings' saqaliba slave trade was in fact other ethnicities such as Baltics, Lithuanians, and Finno-Ugric people.

During the Middle Ages, organized alongside religious principles, both Christians and Muslims banned the enslavement of people of their own faith, but both approved of the enslavement of people of a different faith; both did allow the enslavement of people they regarded to be heretics, which allowed Catholic Christians to enslave Orthodox Christians, and Sunni Muslims to enslave Shia Muslims. However, both Christians and Muslims approved of enslaving Pagans, who came to be a preferred target of the slave trade in the Middle Ages, and Pagan war captives were sold by Pagan enemies into the slave trade.

People taken captive during the Viking raids across Europe, could be sold to Moorish Spain or transported to Hedeby or Brännö and from there via the Volga trade route to Russia, where slaves and furs were sold to Muslim merchants in exchange for Arab silver dirham and silk, which have been found in Birka, Wolin, and Dublin; initially this trade route between Europe and the Abbasid Caliphate passed via the Khazar Kaghanate, but from the early 10th century onward it went via Volga Bulgaria and from there by caravan to Khwarazm, to the Samanid slave market in Central Asia and finally via Iran to the Abbasid Caliphate.

Archbishop Rimbert of Bremen (d. 888) reported that he witnessed a "large throng of captured Christians being hauled away" in the Viking port of Hedeby in Denmark, one of whom was a woman who sang psalms to identify herself as a Christian nun, and who the bishop was able to free by exchanging his horse for her freedom.

Until the 9th century, the Vikings trafficked slaves from the Baltic Sea in the North, via the Wisla or the Donau rivers South East through Europe to the Black Sea. In the 9th century, the Viking slave route was redirected, and until the 11th century the Vikings trafficked slaves from the Baltic Sea via Ladoga, Novgorod and the Msta river to the Black Sea (and the Byzantine Empire), or to the Caspian Sea (and the Middle East) via the Volga trade route.

The Viking slave trade stopped in the 11th century, when Denmark, Norway, and Sweden became Christian themselves and thus could no longer trade in Christian slaves.

===== Baltic slave trade =====
The Baltics appears to have been a center of slave trade, as well as a slave supply source, already during antiquity.

The role of the Baltics in the European slave trade is more documented during the middle ages. In the middle ages, the Baltics became a religious border zone as one of the last remaining Pagan areas in Christian Europe. This was significant in the context of the slave trade, since both Christians and Muslims banned the enslavement of people of their own religion, but Pagans were viewed a legitimate targets of enslavement for sale to both Christians and Pagans, which made them the most lucrative choice for slave trade. Up until the Christianization of the Baltics in the 13th century, therefore, the Baltic people were viewed as legitimate targets of slave trade from the surrounding slave traders, such as the vikings from the West and the Rus of the Kievan Rus' slave trade from the East.

Since both Christians and Muslims banned the enslavement of people of their own faith but viewed pagans as legitimate targets for slavery, the pagans of northeastern Europe became highly targeted by the slave traders when the rest of Europe had become Christian by the 12th century. The pagan Lithuanians, Latvians, Estonians, Livonians, and Latgallians raided each other, Ingria and Novgorod during the 12th- and 13th-centuries, and sold war captives south to the Black Sea slave trade. The Christian Rus' merchants of the Kievan Rus' slave trade raided the pagan Estonians to sell them in the slave trade, since they were viewed as a legitimate target because they were pagans.

However, the Baltics were not only a victim of slave raids as a slave supply source by foreign slave traders; they were also an Ancient center of slave trade themselves. When the Norse Vikings became Christian and ended their piracy in the 11th century, they were succeeded by pagan pirates from the Baltics, who raided the coasts of the Baltic Sea, such as now Christian Sweden and Finland, for slaves. When the Viking slave trade stopped in the mid 11th century, the old slave trade route between the Baltic Sea and the Black Sea and Central Asia via the Russian rivers was upheld by Pagan Baltic slave traders, who sold slaves via Daugava to the Black Sea and East, which was now the only remaining slave trade in Europe after the slave market in Western Europe had died out in the 12th century. In the 13th century, the Latvian reportedly had found slave trade to be so lucrative that many used it has their main income. The island of Saaremaa was a base for the Baltic pirates, who were noted for selling women captives to the slave trade. In 1226, the pagan Baltic pirates from Saaremaa conducted a slave raid toward now Christian Sweden, where they captured many Swedish women and girls with the purpose to sell as slaves.

The Baltic slave trade ended after conquest of the Baltic by the Teutonic order during the 13th century.

===== Kievan Rus' slave trade =====
From the 9th-century, slaves were the perhaps most important export from Rus' to the Byzantine Empire, which was otherwise not very interested in goods from Eastern Europe.

The Norse Vikings who established themselves in Kievan Rus' in the 9th-century managed a vast slave trade network that reached from the Baltic Sea via the water ways South to the Caspian Sea and the Black Sea, transporting European captives both from Denmark to Spain (al-Andalus) and North Africa in the West, as well as to Central Asia and the Middle East in the East.

In the Eastern European slave trade, the Vikings trafficked European captives via the river ways through Rus' along the Route from the Varangians to the Greeks from Sweden to Novgorod and to the Byzantine Empire in the Black Sea, a trade which was one of the most lucrative trades of Novgorod from the 10th century to the 15th century.

The Bulgar Khan regularly conducted slave raids toward the Russian principalities and captured Russian "infidels" whom they sold to the Islamic Middle East via the Black Sea slave trade in exchange for weapons.

According to contemporary Muslim sources, the Vikings, the Bulgars and the Madjars captured Slavic people in Eastern Europe and transported them alongside the river ways alongside the Volga trade route to Volga, where the captives were sold and transported to the Byzantine Empire in Southwest, and to the Islamic world in the Southeast via the Samanid Empire and Khwarezm.

By the 11th century, Kievan Rus' had a centuries-long tradition of performing slave raids on each other and selling the captives as slaves, and when Kievan Rus' disintegrated in all but name in the 1130s, this traditional warfare slave raiding resurfaced. When Kievan Rus' started to disintegrate in internal warfare between the smaller Russian states in the 12th century, the various Russian princes and their Cuman (Kipchak) allies captured the subjects of enemy Russian princes during their wars, which were sold to the slave traders.

==== Slave market ====
Slavery in the Byzantine Empire was still widely practiced during the early Middle Ages. Emperor Basil I owned 3,000 slaves, and when Emperor Manuel I manumitted all the slaves in the capital of Constantinople in the 12th century, Eustathius of Thessalonica noted that most of the slaves came from "beyond the Danube" by origin and have arrived via the "northern winds" from Pontic lands, likely a euphemism from slaves exported to Byzantine by the Vikings via the Black Sea slave trade.

==== Abolition ====
Information about the Byzantine slave trade is fragmentary prior to the 13th century, when it was taken over by Genoese and Venetian merchants, who established colonies in the Crimea in the 13th century.

=== Italian slave trade (13th–15th centuries) ===
Feodosia and territorial demarcations in the 15th century

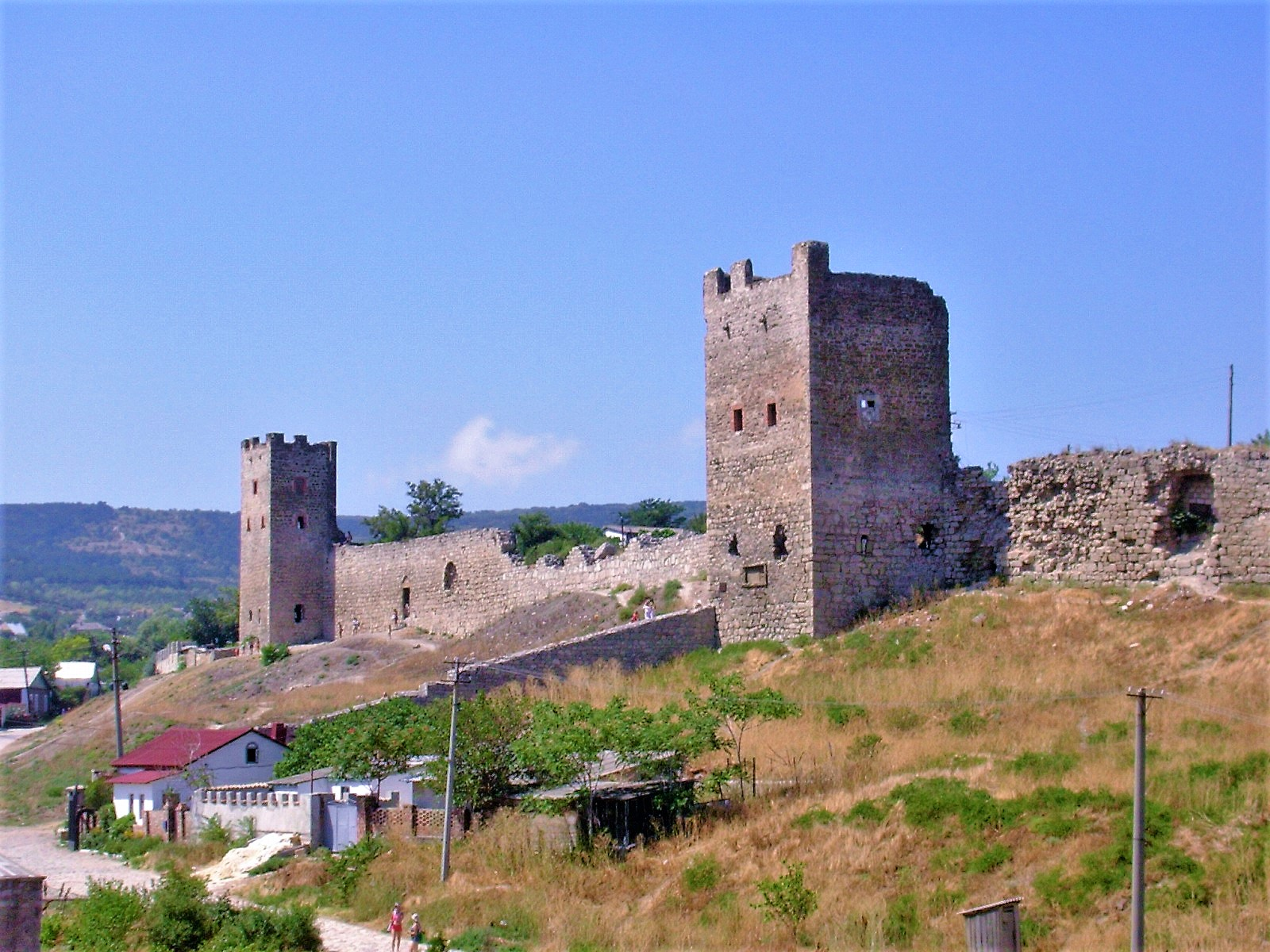
Genoese Castle in Caffa, when Caffa was a major port of the Genoese slave trade.

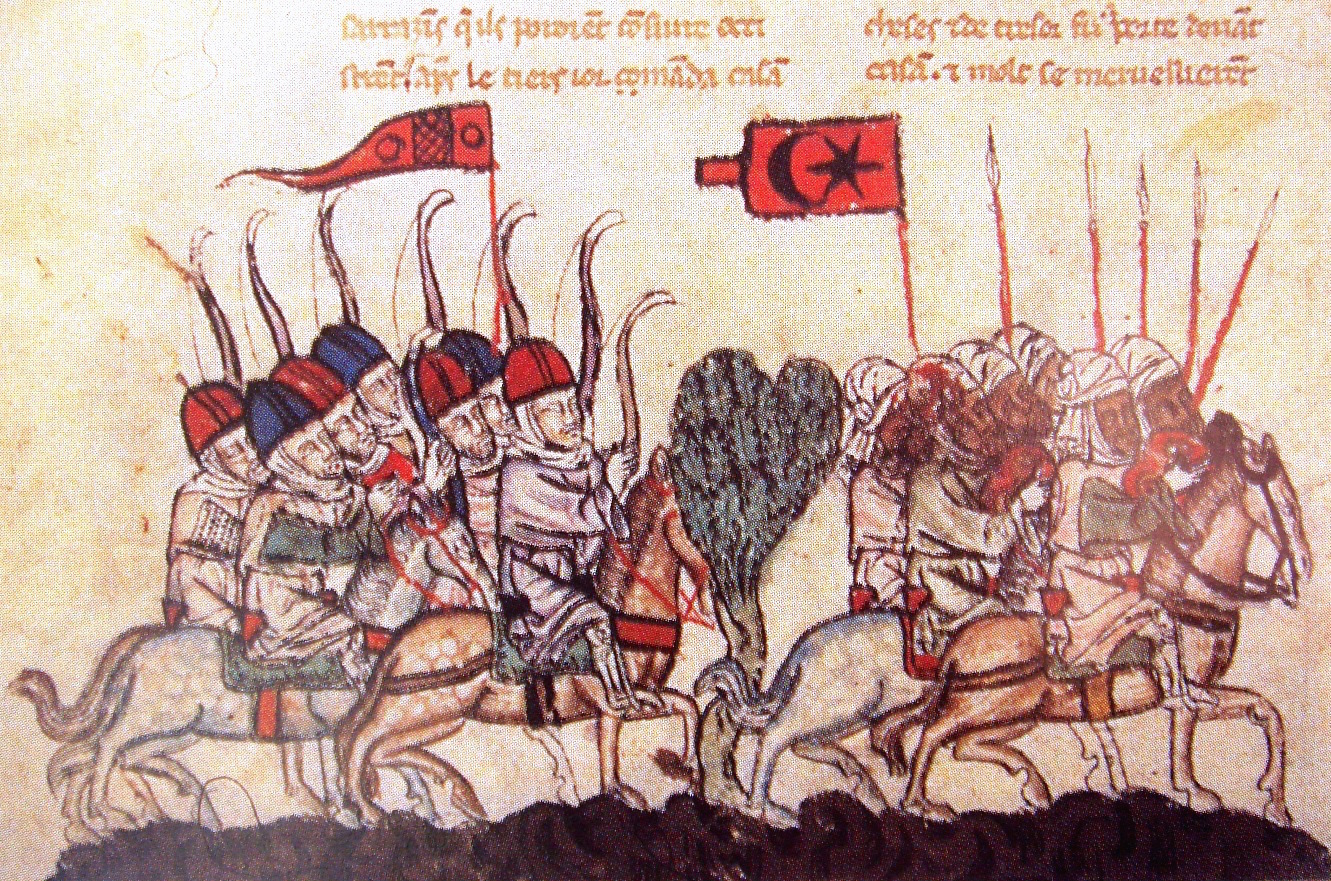
The battle of Wadi al-Khazandar, 1299, depicting Mongol archers and Mamluk cavalry. During that time many mamluk soldiers originated from the Balkan slave trade and the Black Sea slave trade.

In the late Middle Ages (13th–15th centuries), the Black Sea was the center of the Genoese slave trade and the Venetian slave trade, which exported slaves from Eastern Europe via their controlled cities in Crimea to Spain and Italy and to the Islamic Middle East.

==== Background ====
Slavery died out in Western Europe after the 12th century, but the demand for laborers after the Black Death resulted in a revival of slavery in Southern Europe in Italy and in Spain, as well as an increase in the demand for slaves in Egypt.

Italian merchants, particularly the Genoese and Venetians, who had a large web of contacts as traders in the Mediterranean Sea, early established themselves in the slave trade. Initially they did so as traveling merchants, but eventually they managed to acquire their own trading colonies in the Crimea.

In the 13th century, Byzantine control in the Crimea weakened by the sack of Constantinople in 1204, and Italian trade colonies took control over the Black Sea slave trade, with the Republic of Venice establishing in Sudak in the Crimea in 1206 and later in Tana, and the Republic of Genoa in Caffa in 1266.

==== Slave trade ====
The majority of the slaves in the Italian Black Sea slave trade came to be enslaved via three main methods; as war captives during warfare, such as the Mongol invasions, the wars between the Golden Horde and the Ilkhanate, and the conquests of Timur; via slave raids; or through parents selling their own children or relatives to slavery, which occurred because of poverty and was a regular and common occurrence especially after the Black Death, when the demand for slaves was high in both Southern Europe and the Middle East.

Common targets of slavery were Pagan Finno-Ugric and Turkish people.

===== Baltics and Finland =====
In this time period, religious conviction was an important factor in who was considered legitimate to enslave. Christians could not be enslaved by Christians, and Muslims could not be enslaved by Muslims. However, since both Christians and Muslims regarded pagans to be legitimate targets of slavery, the remaining pagans of northeastern Europe became an economical choice for the slave traders.

In the 13th century, all of Europe had become Christian with the exception of the Baltics, Eastern Finland and Karelia, which became supply zones for slaves to the Black Sea slave trade, from where they were trafficked by Italian slave traders to Southern Europe and the Islamic Middle East.

===== Caucasus =====
Genoese slave traders bought slaves from a number of different ethnic groups in the Caucasus, such as Abkhazians, Mingrelians, and Circassians, from which families sold their own children and adolescents to slave traders.

People from the Caucasus were not only sold by their families but also taken captive in slave raids. In the 14th century, a contemporary witness from Sultaniyyah described how Circassian tribal noblemen conducted slave raids toward other Circassian tribes, "go out from one village to another publicly, or else secretly if they can, and violently seize children and adults of the other village, and immediately sell [them] to merchants by the sea. And in the same way as the Tatars were accustomed to sell theirs, so too these wretched people", after which the slaves were taken to the Crimea, where a witness statement noted that slave traders were "selling Christians for a price on market days, where they are dragged with a rope tied from the tail of a horse to the neck of those who are sold".

However, the slave trade was not confined to the Caucasus, but extended along the entire Black Sea coastline, the official slave sale records of the town notaries of the Crimean town of Kaffa lists the following nations: "many Armeni, Ziqui, Gothi, Tat, Valachus, Rus, Ivlach, Alani, Avari, Kumuch" then a little later again lists more slaves by ethnicity in the document "Ziqui, Abhaz, Lech, Georgi, Rus, unknown, Borgar, Ungalus, Maniar."

===== Mongol Empire =====
In parallel with the establishment of the Venetian and Genoese colonies in the Crimea, the Mongol Empire conquered Russia, and the Italian Black Sea slave trade expanded in parallel with the Mongol warfare, with the Mongols encouraging the trade, using it to dispose of particularly Russian slaves; up until the Russian uprising of 1262, for example, the Mongols sold Russian peasants who were unable to pay tribute to the Italian slave traders in the Crimea.

==== Slave market ====
The Italian slave trade had two main routes; from the Crimea to Byzantine Constantinople, and via Crete and the Balearic Islands to Italy and Spain; or to the Mamluk Sultanate in Egypt, which received the majority of the slaves.

From at least 1382 onward, the majority of the Mamluks of the Egyptian Mamluk Sultanate, Burji Mamluks and Bahri Mamluks, of slave origin came from the Black Sea slave trade; around a hundred Circassian males intended for Mamluks were being trafficked via the Black Sea slave trade until the 19th century.

The majority of the slaves trafficked to South Europe (Italy and Spain) were girls, since they were intended to become ancillae maid servants, while the majority of the slaves, around 2,000 annually, were trafficked to the Egyptian Mamluk Sultanate, in that case most of them boys, since the Mamluk Sultanate needed slave soldiers.

Among the examples where the mamluk soldier and later sultan Abu Sa'id Qansuh (r. 1498–1500); Aṣalbāy, wife of sultan Al-Ashraf Janbalat (r. 1500–1501), and Maddalena, mother of Carlo de' Medici (1428–1492), who is noted to have been a Circassian slave bought in 1427 in Venice.

==== Abolition ====
After the fall of Constantinople in 1453, the Ottomans closed the trade between the Crimea and the West. The slave trade gradually diminished, and in 1472, only 300 slaves are registered to have been trafficked from Caffa.

From the 1440s, Spain and Portugal started to import their slaves from first the Canary Islands, and then from Africa; initially via the trans-Saharan slave trade from Libya, and then by starting the Atlantic slave trade.

The Ottoman Empire and the Crimean Khanate conquered the Venetian and Genoese cities in region in 1475, and the slave trade was then taken over by Muslim slave traders.

== Crimean slave trade (15th–18th centuries) ==
Political map of Black Sea region around 1600

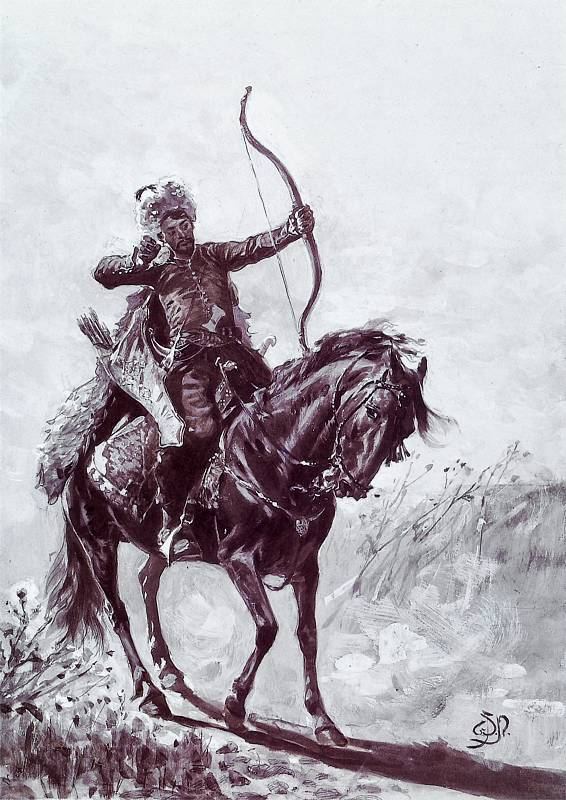
Crimean Tatar archer

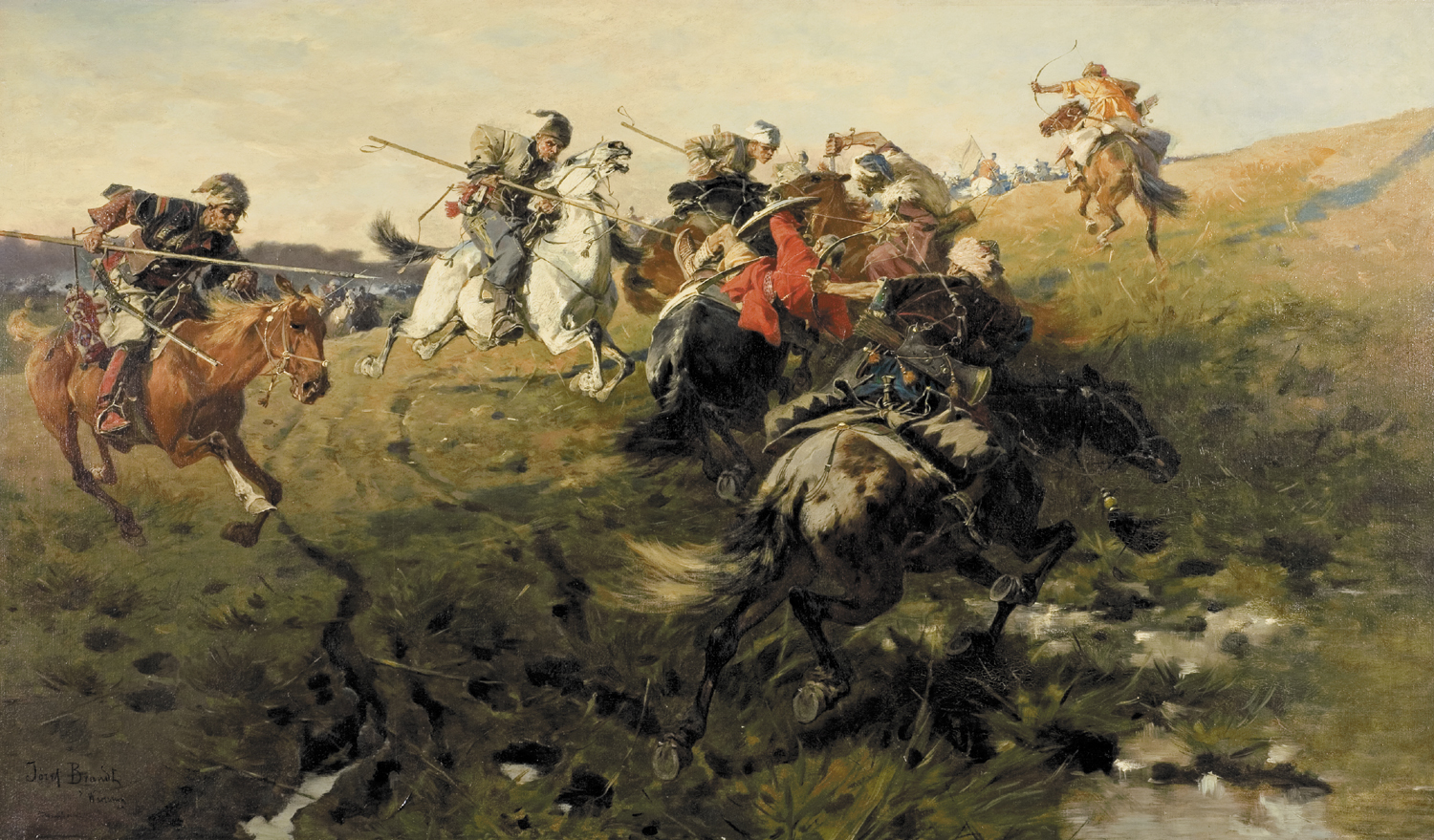
Crimean–Nogai slave raids in Eastern Europe

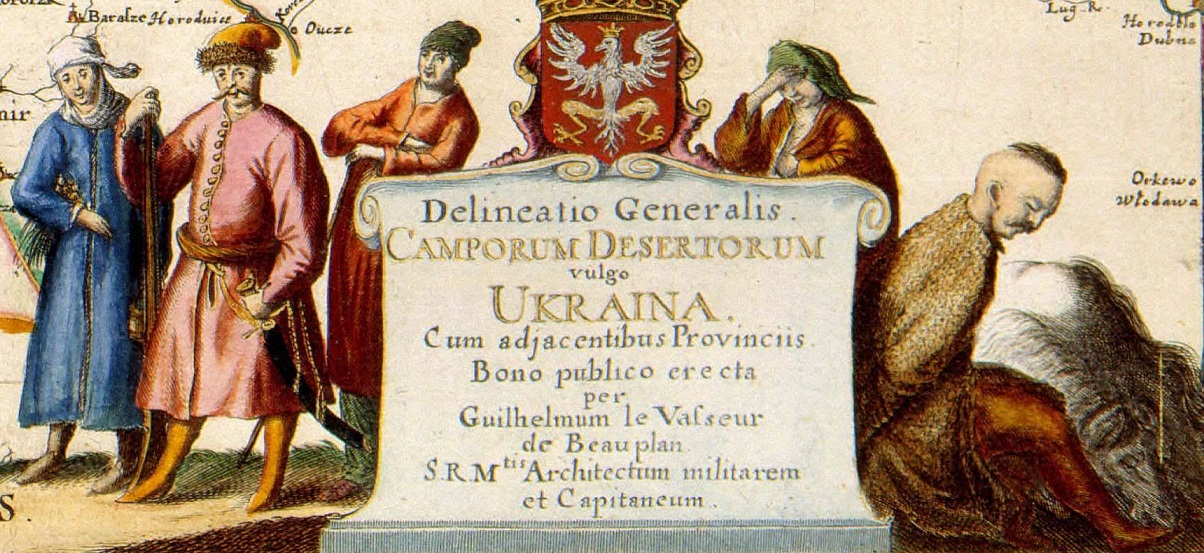
Delineatio Generalis Camporum Desertorum vulgo Ukraina (General sketch of devastated fields commonly known as Ukraina)

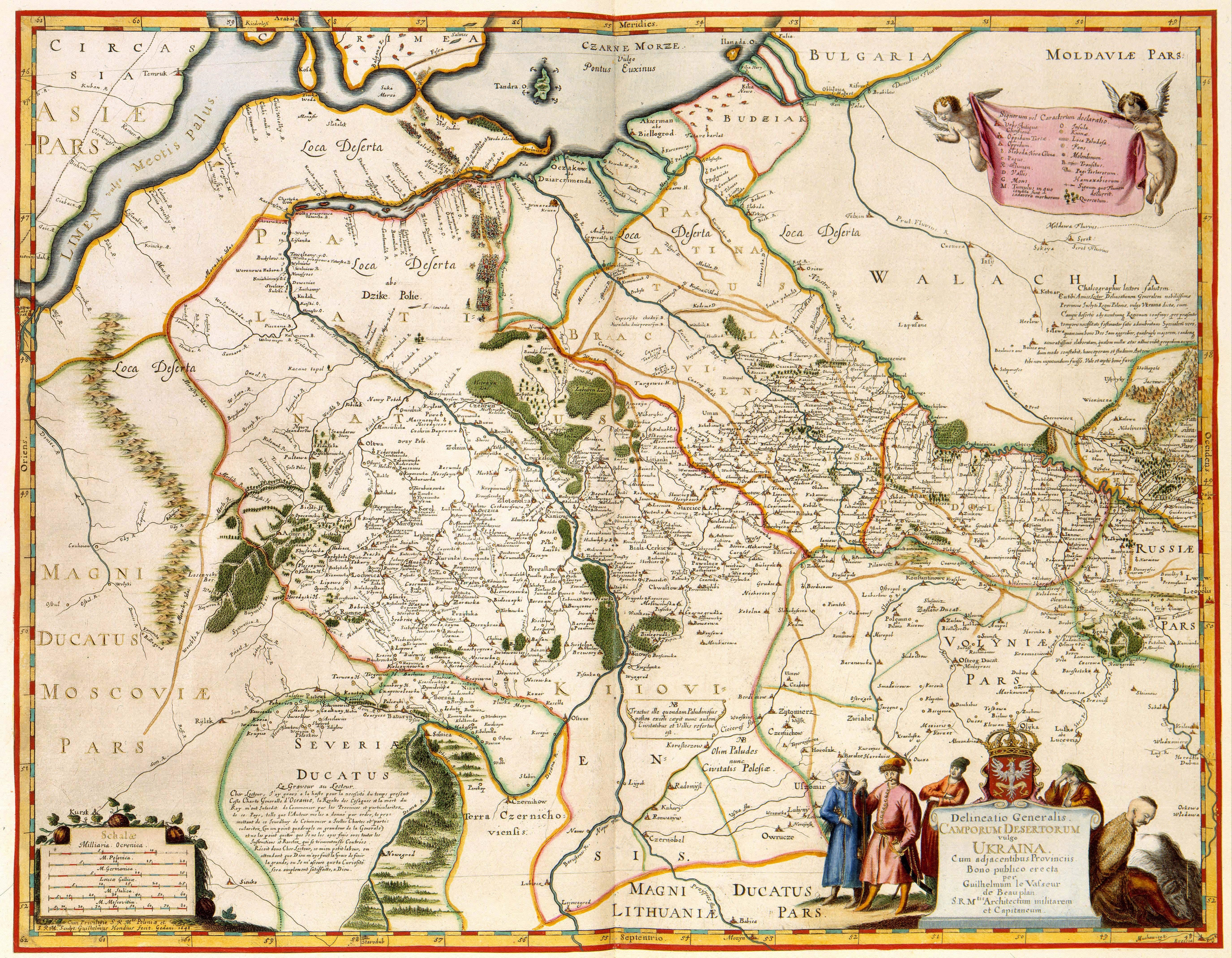
The Wild Fields on a map by French-Polish cartographer Guillaume Le Vasseur de Beauplan, 1648

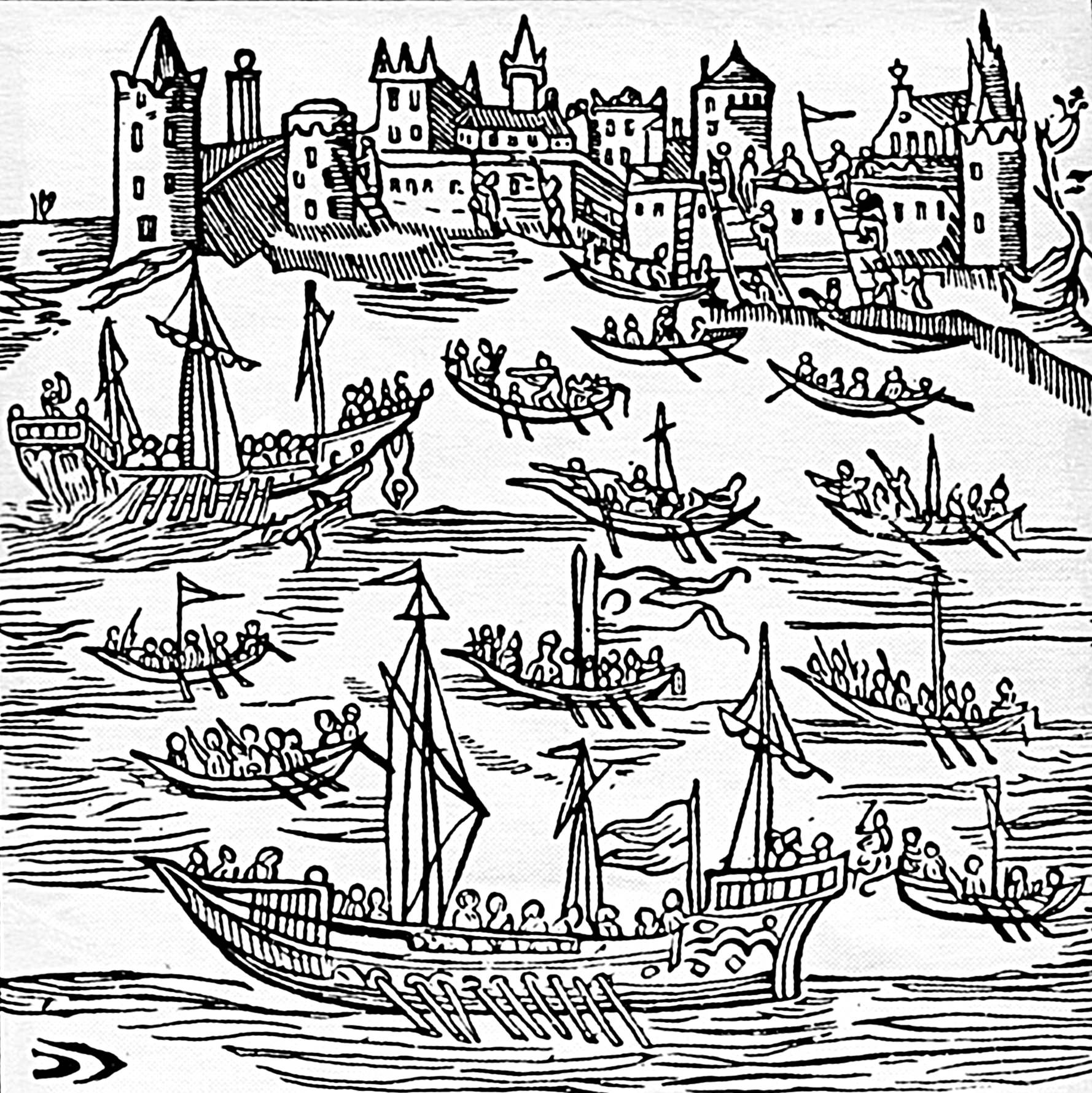
Ukrainian cossacks conquer Feodosia

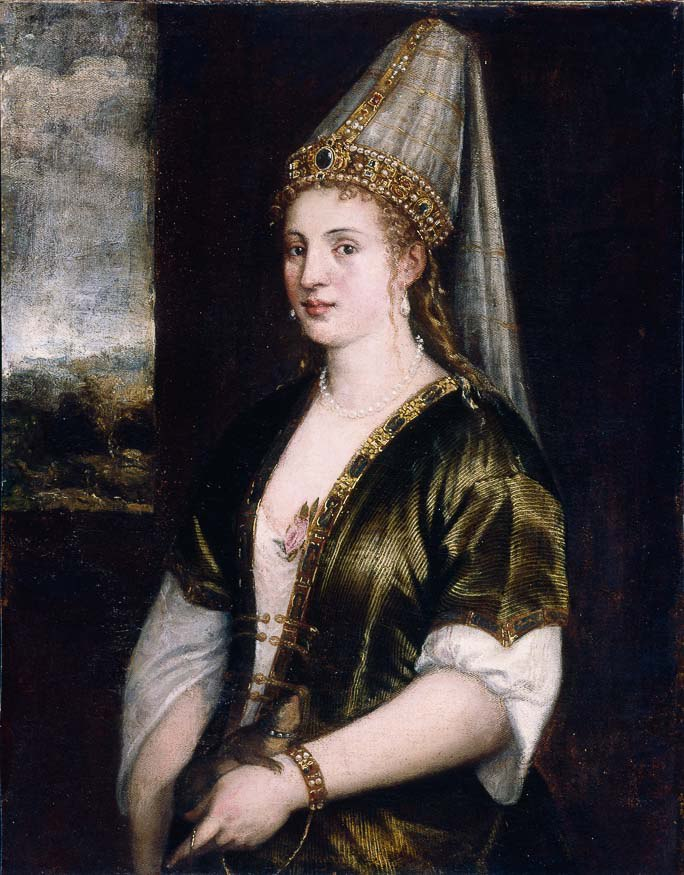
Roxelana, Hürrem Sultan, one of the most famous victims of the Crimean slave trade, captured in around June or July of 1520.

During the Early Modern age the Crimean Khanate (1441–1783) was a major center of the international slave trade. The Crimean slave trade was the main source of income of the Khanate. The Crimean slave trade in Eastern Europe, and the Barbary slave trade in Western and Southern Europe, were the two main sources of European slaves to the Ottoman Empire.

During this period the Crimea was the destination of the Crimean–Nogai slave raids in Eastern Europe, and European slaves were trafficked to the Middle East via the Crimea.

=== Background ===
When the Crimean Khanate was founded in the 1440s, the Crimean Tatars initially taxed the Italian slave trade in the Italian ruled cities – mainly Caffa – in the Crimea.

The Crimean Khanate had a small population and a rudimentary agriculture and needed another source of income as well as a supply of laborers for the estates they founded. They therefore started to tax the Italian slave trade and conduct raids to supply more slaves.

The Italian ruled cities in Crimea were taken by the Ottoman Empire by 1475. In 1462 the Venetian and Genoese had started to hire Polish mercenaries, which made the Ottoman Sultan concerned that Crimea would come under Polish hegemony. This resulted in an Ottoman campaign taking advantage of internal instability in the Crimean Khanate to conquer the Venetian and Genoese ruled cities in the region, and by 1475 all those cities were under Ottoman control, and the Crimean Khan had submitted to the Ottoman Sultan as a vassal, uniting their forces to the Ottomans.

Caffa was transformed into an Ottoman province, after which the slave trade was taken over by Muslim Ottoman slave traders in collaboration with the Crimea Khanate, connecting the Crimean slave trade to the Ottoman slave trade and a joint venture between the Crimean Khanate and the Ottoman Empire. The Crimean slave trade was also connected to the Khivan slave trade and the Bukhara slave trade further east in Central Asia, as the slave market in Khiva and Bukhara was also provided with Europeans (mostly Russians) captured by the Crimean Tatars.

=== Slave trade ===
The Nogai Horde were vassals of the Crimean Khanate and economically dependent upon the slave trade, and performed the slave raids independently, or in collaboration with the Crimean Tatars, who were dependent on slave trade and slave labor on their estates.

The slaves were captured in southern Russia, Poland–Lithuania, Moldavia, Wallachia, and Circassia by Tatar horsemen in a trade known as the "harvesting of the steppe". Slave raids were conducted by the Nogai Horde and or the Crimean Tatars toward Russia, Poland–Lithuania, and the Caucasus twice every year; during the harvest and during the winter.

A Ukrainian folk song remembered the despair and devastation of the slave raids:

"The fires are burning behind the river.
The Tatars are dividing their captives.
Our village is burnt and our property plundered.
Old mother is sabred and my dear is taken into captivity."

The majority of the slaves captured were forced into slave caravans by land and then by sea to the city of Caffa, which was an Ottoman province in the Crimean Khanate and a major center of the Crimean slave trade. There were reportedly always around 30,000 slaves in Caffa. The Lithuanian Mikhalon Litvin referred to Caffa in the 16th century as: "not a town, but an abyss into which our blood is pouring". From Caffa, the captives were distributed between the Ottomans and the Crimean Tatars, and some were distributed to the smaller slave markets in the Crimean Khanate, while the rest were sold in Caffa and trafficked to the rest of the Ottoman Empire and the Islamic Middle East.

The Crimean slave trade is estimated to have been as large in numbers as the Transatlantic slave trade until the 18th century, when the Atlantic slave trade exploded and surpassed the Crimean slave trade in numbers.

==== Balkans and Hungary ====
The Crimean slave raids to the Balkans were conducted in collaboration with the Ottomans, or with Ottoman approval, since the majority of the Balkans were under Ottoman suzerainty, and Islamic law banned the enslavement of people living under Islamic rule. Raids were conducted when the various territories were in conflict with the Ottoman Empire and thus defined as enemy territory.

Until 1699, Habsburg Hungary was the only part of the Balkans not under Ottoman suzerainty. Between 1521 and 1717, the Crimean Khanate conducted slave raids to Hungary in collaboration with or with permission from the Ottoman Empire during the warfare between the Ottoman Empire and the Habsburg monarchy.

During the war between the Ottoman Empire and the Principality of Transylvania in the 1660s, the Crimean Khanate conducted raids as far West as Moravia.

The last Crimean slave raid to Hungary was conducted in 1717, during which 1,464 people were captured in the Ugocsa County, 861 of whom succeeded in escaping from the caravan going back to the Crimea.

==== Circassia and Caucasus ====
The slave trade with Circassians from Caucasus had been a big slave route already during the Italian slave trade period, but during the Crimean slave trade it came to be a permanent luxury slave trade route providing elite slaves to the Ottoman Empire and the Middle East.

The question how Muslims Circassians could be enslaved by Muslims despite the Islamic law allowing Muslims to take only non-Muslims as slaves, has been an item of speculation. Circassians in Caucasus were, however, split between Muslims, Christians, and pagans until the late 18th century, with different religions dominating in different regions and different social classes.

The Crimean Khan regarded the Circassians tribal princes as their vassals, defined them as infidels and thus viewed them as legitimate targets for slave tributes for the Crimean Khanate as well as the Ottoman Empire, as well as punitive slave raid expeditions in collaboration with Ottoman troops. The Circassian elite gradually converted to Islam between the 16th and 18th centuries, and were therefore able to participate themselves in the raids for slave tributes performed by the Crimean-Ottoman against other Circassians.

The Circassian slave trade of elite slaves to the Ottoman Empire came to be so essential for the Middle Eastern slave market that it survived the fall of the Crimean Khanate in 1783. After the annexation of the Crimea by Russia, the Circassian slave trade was redirected from the Crimea and came to be conducted directly by Ottoman slave traders from the Caucasus, a trade that continued during the 19th century.

==== Poland–Lithuania and Ukraine ====
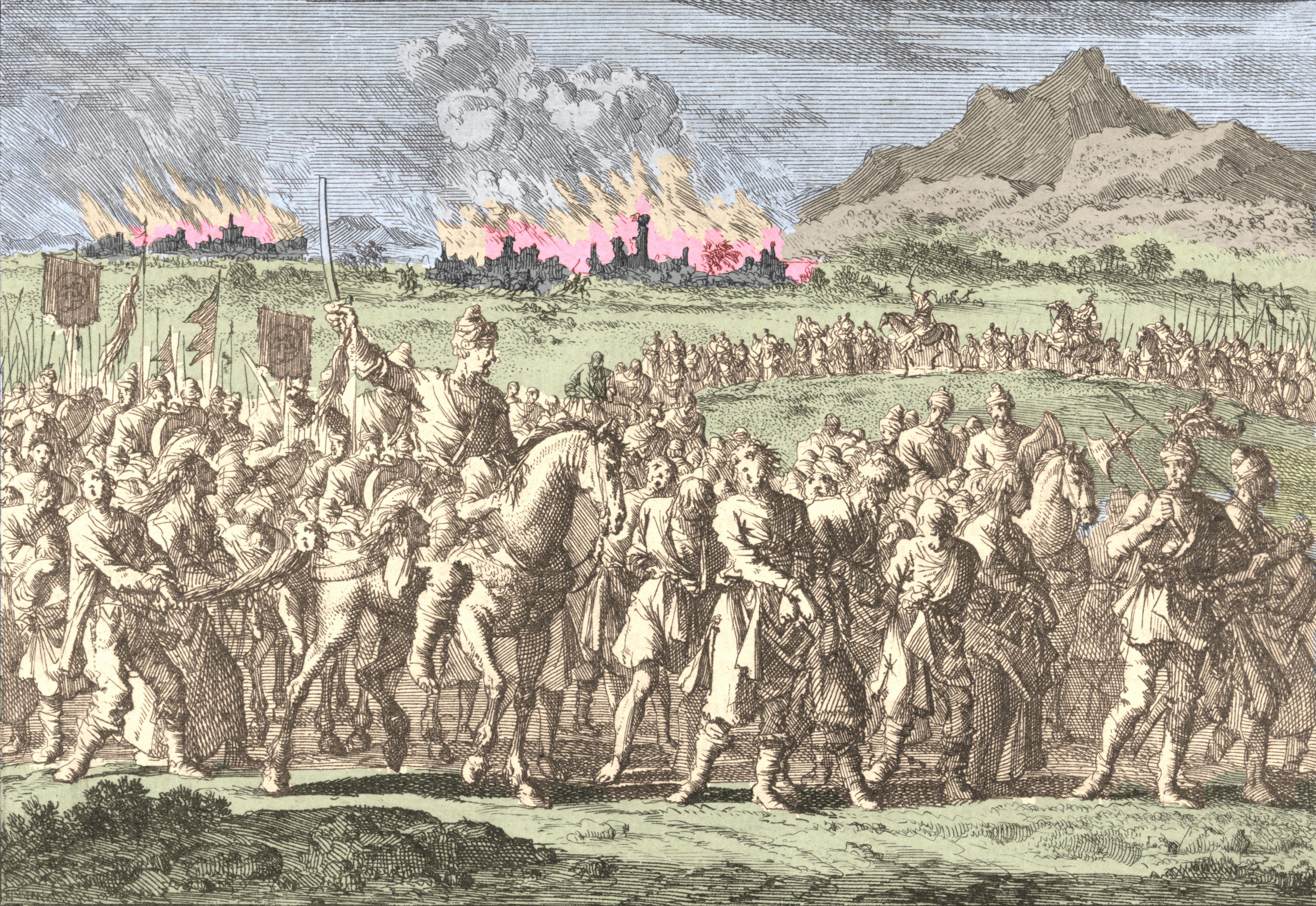
Invasion of the Tatars in Poland in 1666. Drawing by Jan Luyken, 1698.

In this time period, Poland and Lithuania were united, and Ukraine was a part of Poland–Lithuania. The first major Crimean–Nogai raid were conducted toward South Eastern Poland in 1468.

It is not documented exactly how many raids were conducted, where and how, and exactly the number of people abducted between the late 15th century and the late 18th century. Between 1474 and 1569, 75 major slave raids are estimated to have been conducted toward Polish–Lithuanian territory. During the year of 1676 alone, circa 40,000 people are estimated to have been abducted from the territory of Volhynia-Podolia-Galicia, and at least 20,000 people are estimated to have been abducted from the territory of Poland–Lithuania every year between 1500 and 1644, or at least one million people.

A Polish proverb described death as a better fate than being captured by a slave raid: "O how much better to lie on one's bier, than to be captive on the way to Tatary". Polish captives were marched down to the port of Ochakiv, where they were loaded on to slave ships and trafficked to Caffa in the Crimea. Polish was such a common ethnicity for a slave in the Crimea Khanate, that the Polish language was the second language in the Crimea. Among the most known victims of the Crimean slave raids from Poland was Roxelana, also known as Hürrem Sultan.

==== Russia ====
The Grand Duchy of Moscow and the Crimean Khanate were both the vassals of the Golden Horde, which initially protected Russia from being subjected to the slave raids the Crimean Khanate conducted toward Poland and Lithuania. However, when the Golden Horde fell in 1502, Russia's protective status against the Crimean Khanate ended and from that point onward the Crimean raids where conducted against Russia as well as Poland.

From 1507 onward, Russia was a constant target of the Crimean-Nogai raids. It is not documented exactly how many raids were conducted, where and how, and exactly the number of people abducted, but at least 43 major raids were documented toward Russia between 1500 and 1550. In the period of circa 1600 and 1650, between 150,000 and 200,000 Russians are estimated to have been abducted in the raids; in the period of 1633–1646, around 15,115 people were either killed or abducted during raids toward Kursk alone.

The last major Crimean-Nogai raid were reportedly conducted toward Russian territory in 1769, during the Russo-Turkish War (1768–1774), when 20,000 people were abducted. Among the victims of the Crimean slave raids from Russia were Turhan Sultan.

==== Sweden, Finland, and the Baltics ====
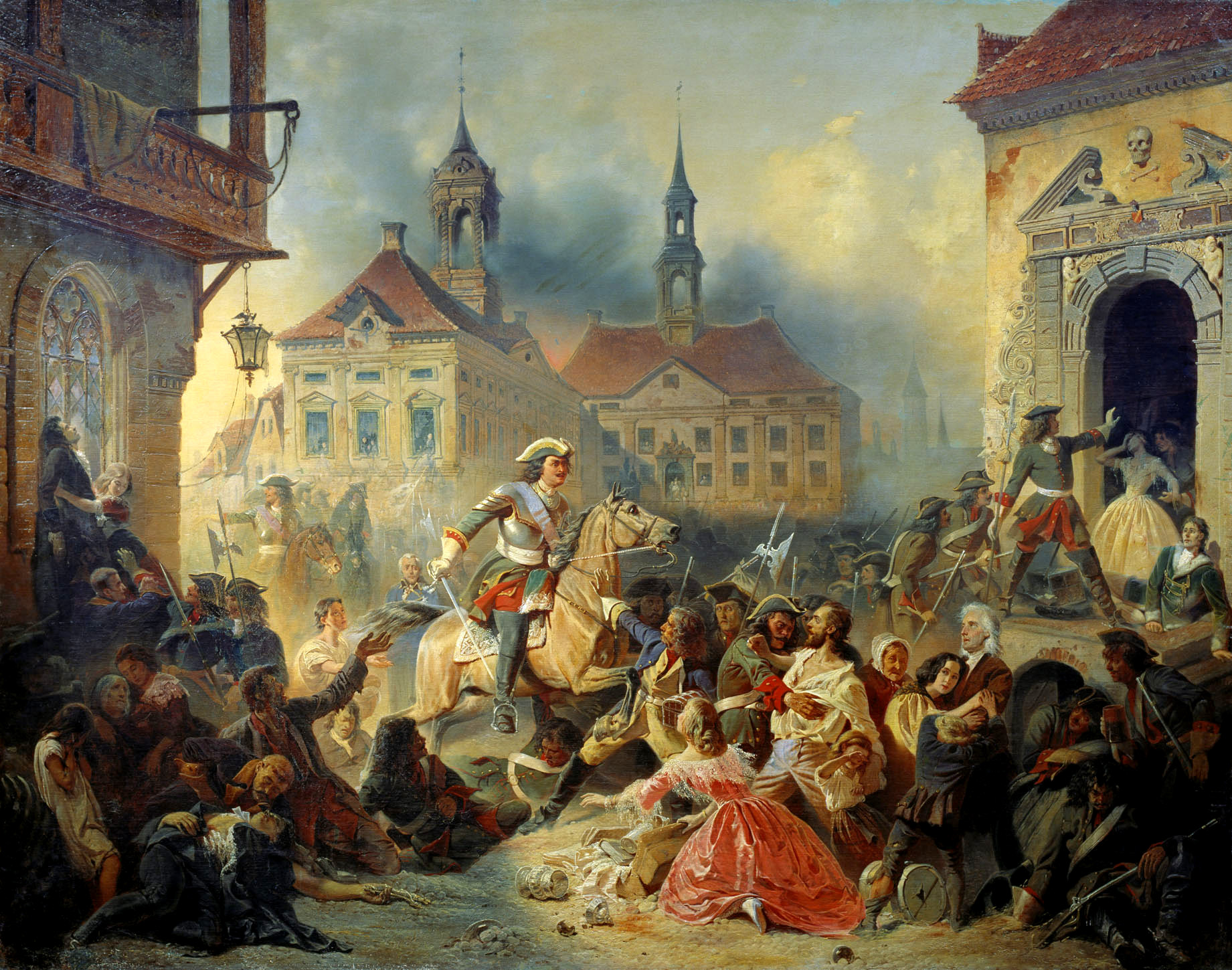
Peter I of Russia pacifies his marauding troops after taking Narva in 1704 by Nikolay Sauerweid, 1859. Many Swedish citizens were captured by Russian soldiers during this occasion, who sold them to the Crimea.

Between the 16th century and the end of the Great Northern War (1700–1721), the Baltics was a part of the Swedish Empire, as was Finland.

The slave raids conducted by private Russian slave traders over the border into Eastern Finland, capturing Finns and trafficking them south to the Black Sea, had been conducted since the Middle Ages and are estimated to have continued throughout the 17th century.

During the Great Northern war between 1700 and 1721, Russia invaded the Eastern provinces of the Swedish Empire in Finland, Estonia and Livonia in the Baltics. Since the 15th century, the Russian Army had allowed private soldiers to capture and sell war captives, and during the Great Northern War many Russian soldiers captured Livonians, Finns, and Baltic civilians (particularly children) from the Swedish provinces and sold them, some of which ended up in the Black Sea slave trade and Persia. One of these occasions was the fall of Narva, where Lovisa von Burghausen was a famous victim of those captured to Russian soldiers with intent to sell. Another case was that of Annika Svahn and Afrosinya. Lovisa, together with two other female slaves, one from Finland and one from Narva, were sold on the Russian slave market in Moscow; the Finnish woman was sold to an Armenian, the woman from Narva to a Russian clerk, and Lovisa to a Turkish-Ottoman merchant.

The Swedish province of Finland was subjected to severe oppression during the Russian invasion and occupation known as the Great Wrath (1714–1721). Among the atrocities were the abductions and enslavement of people by Russian military, some of whom were trafficked via Russia and the Crimean slave trade to Persia and the Middle East, where blonde people were exotic; between 20,000 and 30,000 people are estimated to have been abducted and about a quarter of the Finnish farm houses were reportedly empty at the end of the occupation. Between 10,000 and 20,000 people were taken to serve as slave laborers during the building of Saint Petersburg, about 2,000 men were forcibly enlisted to the Russian army, but many women and children were also abducted as serfs or sex slaves by Russian officers, who in some cases sold them on to the Crimean slave trade; about 4,600 people, the majority of whom were children, were abducted from Österbotten and Eastern Finland.

Many of the Swedish Empire citizens captured and sold by Russian soldiers ended up via the Crimean slave trade in the slave market in Constantinople, where the Swedish ambassador to Constantinople managed to buy some of them free, many of whom were women. From June 1710, the Swedish ambassador Thomas Funck made trips to the slave market in Constantinople to buy Swedish Empire citizens, tours which were noted by his legation priest Sven Agrell. Agrell noted, for example, the purchase of a "carpenter's daughter from Narva" for § (kuruş?) 82, a "Captain's wife" for §240, Catharina Pereswetoff-Morath, age 18, for §275, and an entire Livonian family, Anders Jonsson with his wife and children. Those bought free with Swedish funds were probably escorted to the war camp of King Charles XII of Sweden in Bender and returned to Sweden with him. It was noted however, that though many Swedish Empire citizens were bought free by the Swedish ambassador, it was impossible to buy everyone on sale with the limited funds available during wartime, many young women and children being far too expensive, and that many were therefore purchased to be kept as slaves and left in the Ottoman Empire.

=== Slave market ===
The slave market was in practice divided in two parallel sources of income. One category was made up of rich captives, who were kept in captivity in the Crimea during the negotiations of their ransom, after which they were released and allowed to depart. Another category was made up of poor people, who were not expected to be ransomed, and who were instead sold on the slave market. The Crimean Khanate received its main income from the trade in captives, and the ransom for a rich captive, as well as the sale of a poor captive as a slave, was seen as an equally legitimate income for the Khanate state.

==== Ransom captives ====
The kin of rich prisoners were given the opportunity to buy back the hostage by paying ransom money, which was normally always the case when the captive belonged to the upper class, after which the prisoner was allowed to leave with a certificate of free passing and liberation. The ransom for a captive was normally the market price that would have been paid for the person if they were sold on the slave market or, if the prisoner was from a rich family, double that amount.

A common go-between during the negotiations for ransom were Polish Armenians. Polish Armenians were normally able to speak Turkish languages and had contacts with the Armenian communities in the Crimea, and they often acted as agents, negotiated for the ransom and escorted the hostages back home from the Crimea.

==== Slave captives ====
The majority of the captives were brought to Kefe (Caffa), which was the center of the slave trade. In Caffa there were already existing accommodations for slave trade since the Italian slave trade, but they were significantly enlarged, since the Crimean slave trade was much bigger than the Italian had been. In Caffa, the captives were handed over to Ottoman slave traders. The Ottoman slave traders were often Jews, Greek or Armenian Ottomans. The prisoners were divided between the different participants according to age, sex, and aptitude for resale and market price. Evliya Çelebi described the process:

A man who has not seen this market has seen nothing in this world. There a mother is severed from her son and daughter, a son from his father and brother, and they are sold among lamentations, cries for help, weeping, and sorrow.

The Crimean Khan received 12 percent of the price for every slave sold in the Crimean slave trade. A fifth of the captives were gifted from the Crimean Khan to the Ottoman sultan as a vassal tribute, since the Khan was formally the vassal of the Sultan; another share was divided between the Crimean-Tatar tribal aristocracy as field slaves, the Khan's officials and the Nogai-Tatars as slave-shepherds, and the final share was sold, either in the domestic Crimean markets of Bakhchisarai, Karaseibazar and Evpatoria, or in Kaffa, from where they were exported to the rest of the Ottoman Empire. Slaves trafficked from the Crimean slave trade could be sold far away in the Mediterranean and the Middle East; a Convent in Sinai in Egypt is for example noted to have bought a male slave originating from Kozlov in Russia.

Sir John Chardin, who travelled on the Black Sea in the 1660s and 1670s, described the victims of the Black Sea slave trade when he saw a shipment of slaves being loaded for further transport South as a shipment "of women and children, half-naked, or covered with rags and filth".

In this period, African slaves provided by the trans-Saharan slave trade, the Red Sea slave trade, and the Indian Ocean slave trade were popular for use as domestic servants and laborers, and white slaves provided by the Barbary slave trade and the Black Sea slave trade were used for different purposes in the Middle East. In the 18th century, slave soldiers (Mamluk) in the Middle East were still often made up of white male slaves – janissary, from the Barbary slave trade or the Crimean slave trade. Men without particular skills were used for hard agricultural labor on the estates of the Crimean tribal aristocrats. The worst fate for a male slave was reportedly to become a galley slave; every Ottoman galley required 200 galley slaves, and the Ottoman fleet consisted of between 45,000 and 60,000 galleys in the late 18th century, and these galleys were supplied with many slaves from the Crimean slave trade. In 1642, when an Ottoman galley was captured, 200 galley slaves were liberated, 207 of whom were from Ukraine and 20 were Russian men, some of whom had spent 40 years in captivity. In 1645, the Ottoman Sultan Ibrahim reportedly approved of a slave raid to Poland and Russia specifically because he was constructing 100 new galley ships and required galley slaves to man them. A young healthy Russian man was sold for 50–100 rubles, while Polish and Ukrainian men were more expensive.

While African slave women were foremost bought as domestic laborers, white slave women were preferred for exclusively sexual slavery; as concubines or as wives. The Crimean slave trade was one of the biggest suppliers of women to the Ottoman Imperial Harem. The Imperial Harem was a big institution with 104 female slaves during the reign of Murad III (1574–1595), increasing in size with 295 in 1622, 433 in 1633, 446 during the reign of Mahmud I (r. 1730–1754) and 720 during Selim III (r. 1789–1807); the harem population begun to shrink gradually only during the second half of the 19th century. Girls to the Imperial Harem were sent there as war captives during military campaigns, but also as gifts, or through purchase. Young virgin girls (normally arriving as children) were gifted to the Sultan from local statesmen, family members, grand dignitaries and provincial governors, and particularly from the Crimean Khan; Ahmed III received one hundred Circassian virgin girl slaves as presents upon his accession to the throne. Other girls were bought to the harem by the vizier or by private slave dealers, in private or from the Avrat bazar slave market. Except for the maidservants and the concubines, the harem also required wet nurses (daye cariyes) for the Sultan's children, who were required to be Circassian or Georgian. Since they were bought for sexual purposes, the price of female slaves varied according to the girl's perceived beauty, and the price of female slaves therefore varied greatly between different individuals; the prices of Georgian and Russian girls bought for the Imperial Harem of Ahmed III varied between 150 kuruş and 250 kuruş, while others cost up to 320 kuruş. Preserved documentation does not clearly provide the place of origin for the majority of the slaves to the Imperial Harem, but it is clear that some of the European female slaves were from Greece, Hungary, Poland, Wallachia, and Malta, some of whom were acquired from local Ottoman governors, though more Circassian, Georgian, Abkhasian, and Russian (meaning the arrived via the Crimean slave trade).

The Imperial Harem was a model for the private harems of other rich men in the Middle East. Circassian women were popular as slave concubines by the Crimean Tatar aristocrats, and Ebulgazi Bahadir stated that many Crimean-Tatar men preferred enslaved women as wives because of their beauty.

The male Mamluk aristocrats of Ottoman Egypt, who themselves were often of white slave origin (often Circassian or from Georgia), preferred to marry women of similar ethnicity, while black slave women were used as domestic maids. The white slave women bought to become concubines and wives of the Mamluks, such as for example Nafisa al-Bayda, were often from the Caucasus, Circassians or Georgian.

Outside of the Ottoman Empire, girls from the Black Sea region were also trafficked to Persia during this period. The slave concubines (and later mothers) of the Safavid imperial harem of the Persian Shah mainly consisted of enslaved Circassian, Georgian, and Armenian women, captured as war booty, bought at the slave market, or received as gifts from local potentates. Even some of the slave concubines in the Mughal harem in India were of the same origin as the victims of the Crimean slave trade, such as for example Udaipuri Mahal, who has sometimes been referred to as a Georgian or Circassian, and Aurangabadi Mahal (d. 1688), who was said to be either "Circassian or Georgian", which was likely a term for Russian or Eastern European which would mean they both likely arrived via the Crimean slave trade, perhaps via the Bukhara slave trade.

Slaves from Eastern Europe were known as far away as in the slavery in the Maldives, where they were called Charukeysi (Circassian).

=== Abolition ===
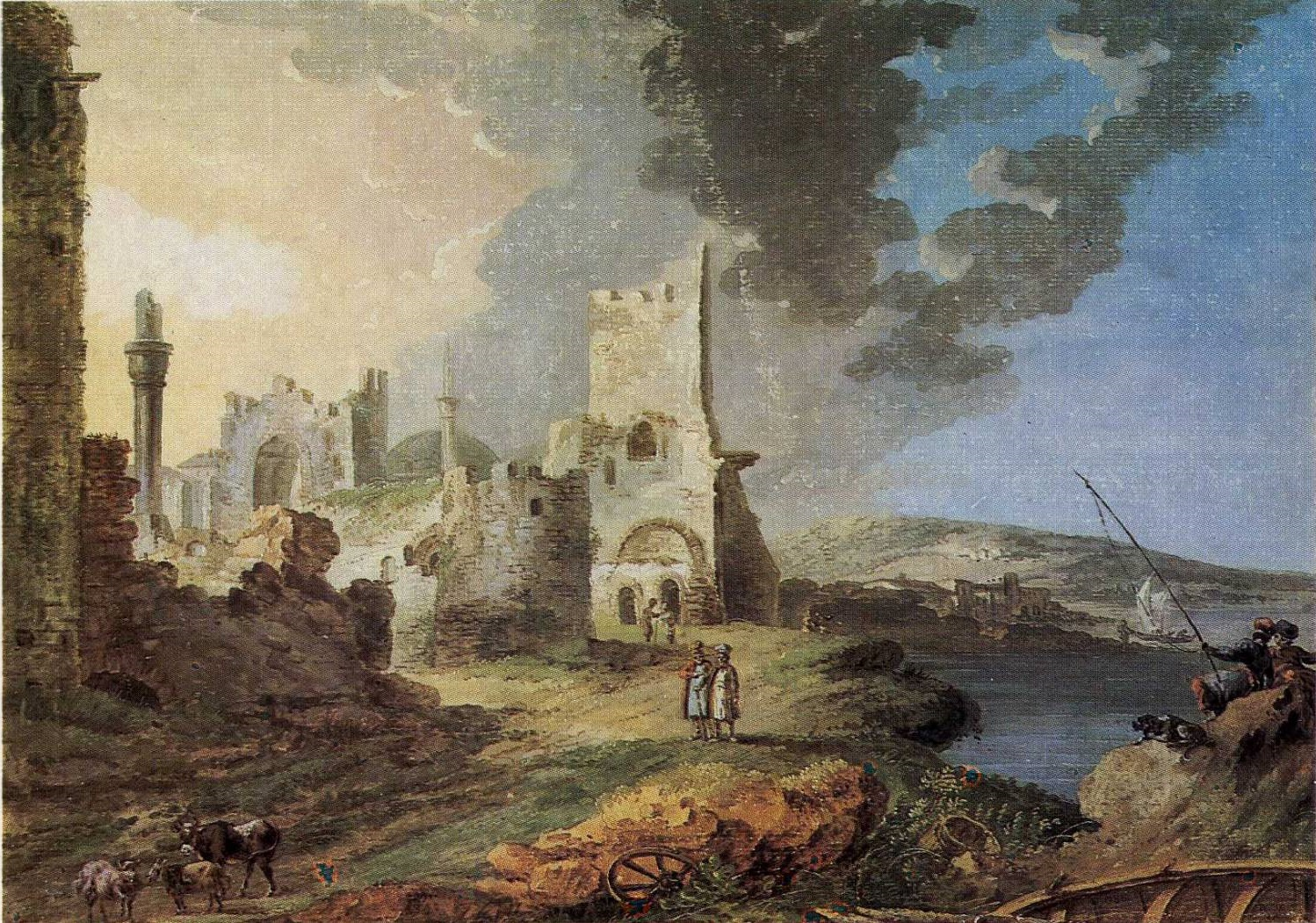
Caffa in ruins after Russian annexation of Crimea

The last slave raid was conducted in 1769, during the Russo-Turkish War (1768–1774), when 20,000 people were taken captive.

In the peace negotiations with Russia in 1773, all Russians captives were released home from the Crimea without needing to pay ransom. After the Treaty of Küçük Kaynarca of 1774, all slaves and captives in the Crimea regardless of nationality were released. The emancipation of such a large slave population as the one in the Crimea was a major project that could not be fulfilled quickly or easily, and in 1775, thousands of slaves were reported to still be left in the Crimea.

In 1783, the Crimean Khanate was dissolved after the Russian annexation of Crimea. As late as 1805 and 1811, when Crimea had been a Russian province for over two decades, thousands of people were still registered in slavery (yasyr) under the Crimea Tatars in the Crimea.

== Circassian slave trade (18th–20th centuries) ==
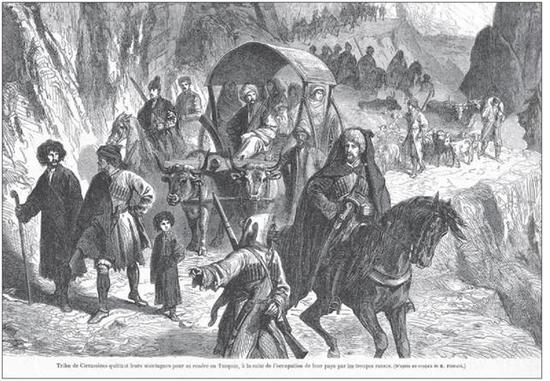
Circassian refugees

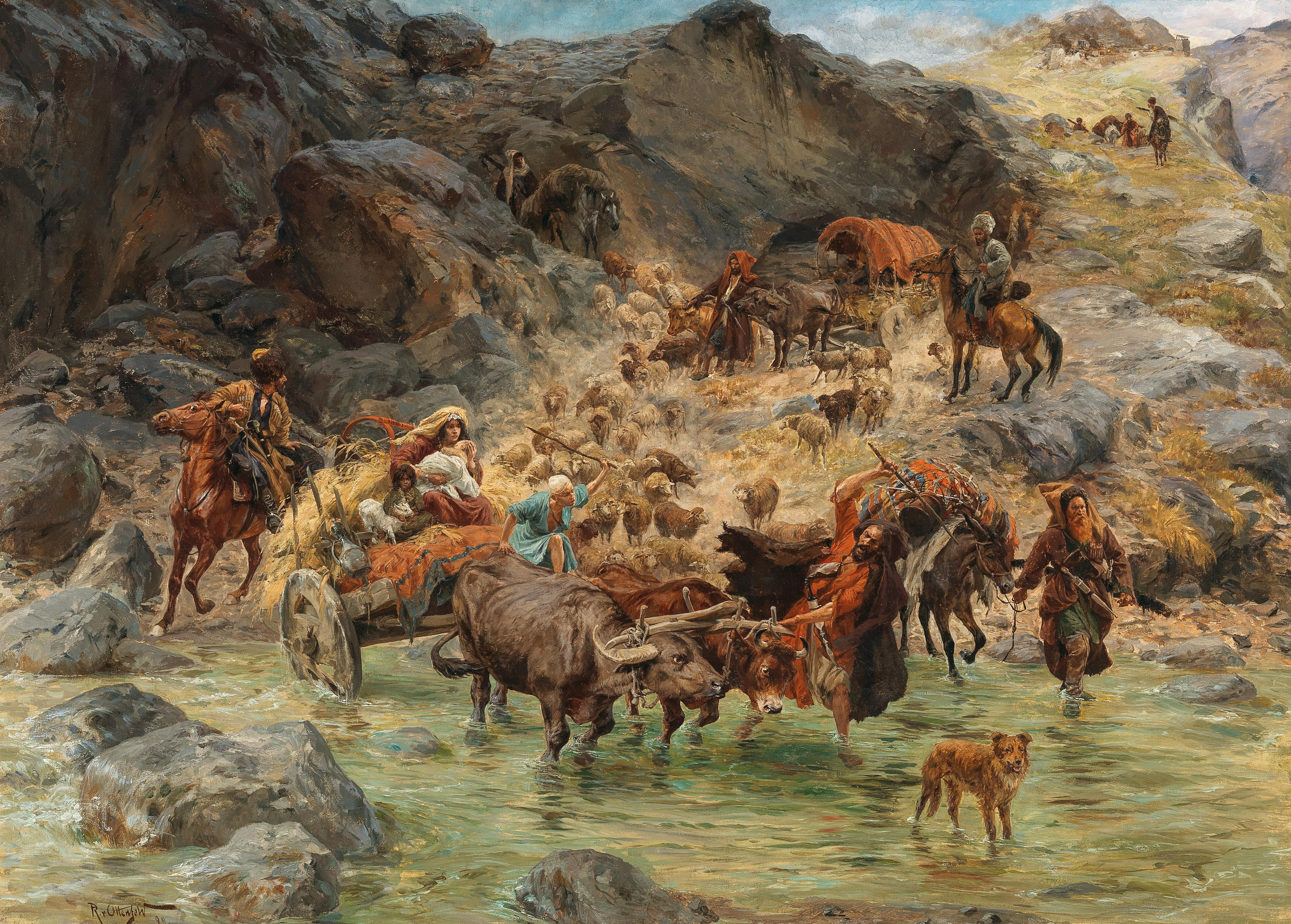
Circassians leaving their villages

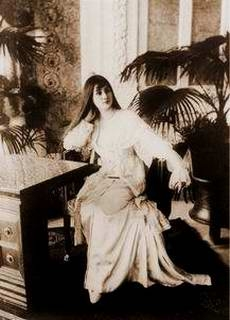
Ikbal Hanim, victim of the Circassian slave trade.

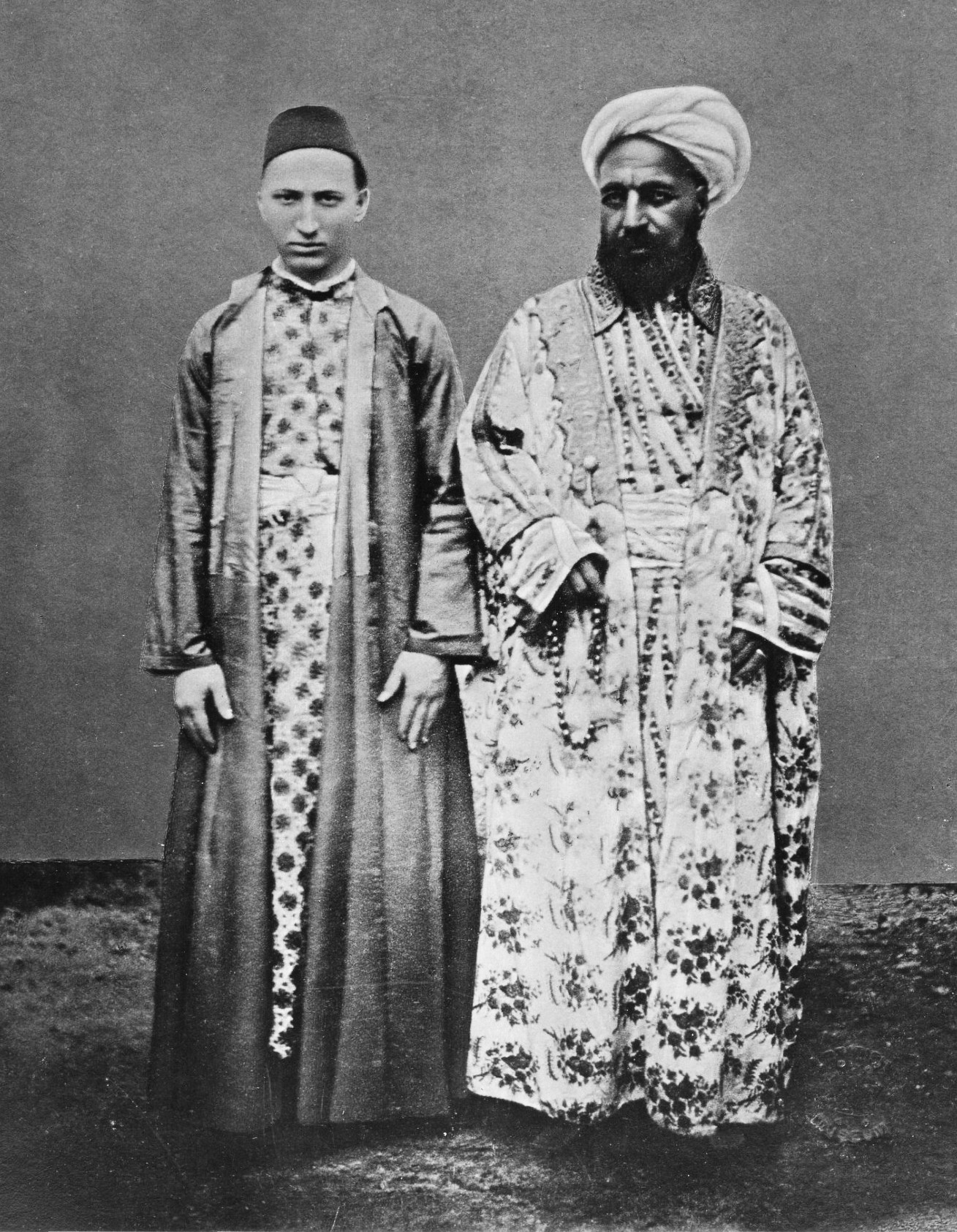
A Meccan merchant (right) and his Circassian slave. Entitled, "Vornehmer Kaufmann mit seinem cirkassischen Sklaven" [Distinguished merchant and his Circassian slave] by Christiaan Snouck Hurgronje, c. 1888.

=== Background ===
The Crimean slave trade was ended with the Russian annexation of Crimea in the late 18th century. However, the slave trade with Circassians from the Caucasus to the Middle East was redirected from the Crimea and instead went directly from the Caucasus to the Ottoman Empire, and was significantly expanded and continued until the early 20th century. The Circassian slave trade has also been referred to as the "Caucasian slave trade".

The Circassian slave trade was heavily (though not entirely) focused on girls. In the Islamic Middle East, African women – trafficked via the trans-Saharan slave trade, the Red Sea slave trade and the Indian Ocean slave trade – were primarily used as domestic house servants and not exclusively for sexual slavery, while white women, trafficked via the Black Sea slave trade, were preferred for the use of concubines (sex slaves) or wives, and there was therefore a constant demand for them in the Middle East.

During the early modern Crimean slave trade, the trade of Circassians from the Caucasus expanded and developed in to what was termed a luxury slave trade route, providing elite slaves to the Ottoman Empire and the Middle East.

From the late 18th century onward, when first the Crimean Khanate slave trade ended with the Russian annexation of 1783, the Circassian slave trade became the main source of white slaves to the Islamic Middle East, and these slaves were referred to as "Circassians".

In the context of the Circassian slave trade, the term Circassians did not necessarily refer to ethnic Circassians, but was used as an umbrella term for a number of different ethnicities from the Caucasus region, such as Georgians, Adyge, and Abkhazians, in the same fashion as the term "Abbyssinians" was used as a term also for African slaves who were not from Abyssinia.

Many of the consorts and mothers of the Ottoman Sultans were Circassians, including, but not limited to: Mahidevran Hatun, Şevkefza Sultan, Rahime Perestu Sultan, Tirimujgan Kadin, Nükhetsezâ Hanim, Hümaşah Sultan, Bedrifelek Kadin, Bidar Kadin, Kamures Kadin, Servetseza Kadin, Bezmiara Kadin, Düzdidil Hanim, Hayranidil Kadin, Meyliservet Kadin, Mihrengiz Kadin, Neşerek Kadin, Nurefsun Kadin, Reftarıdil Kadin, Şayan Kadin, Gevherriz Hanim, Ceylanyar Hanim, Dilfirib Kadin, Nalanıdil Hanim, Nergizev Hanim, and Şehsuvar Kadın. Many other concubines, whose origin is not recorded, were also likely of Circassian ethnicity.

Muslims were banned from enslaving other people who were Muslims before their capture; technically, this made enslaving ethnic Circassians a problem, since many of them were Muslims before their enslavement, but in practice, the fact that so many Circassian slave girls were already Muslims were tolerated as an "open secret" within the slave trade.

=== Slave trade ===
The Caucasus was an ideal area for slave trade, since it was a fragmented border zone affected by constant warfare and political instability. Prior to the Russian conquest, many Circassian tribal leaders and princes acknowledged the suzerainty of the Ottoman sultan and converted to Islam, conducted warfare toward other Circassians and sold the children of their own Circassian serfs to Ottoman slave traders as a way to secure their own finances. Circassian parents became notorious for their alleged willingness to sell their children to Ottoman slave traders, because their poverty made the high demand for Circassian girls highly lucrative.

There was a tendency by Ottomans to claim that slavery was beneficial to the Circassians, since it delivered them from "primitimism to civilisation, from poverty and need to prosperity and happiness", and that they became slaves willingly: "Circassians came to Istanbul willingly 'to become wives of the Sultan and the Pachas, and the young men to become Beys and Pachas'". It was commonly claimed that Circassian girls were eager to be enslaved and asked their parents to sell them to the traders, because it was the only way for them to enhance their class status. It was commonly known that Circassian girls were mainly bought to become wives or concubines to rich men, which made the Circassian slave trade to be viewed as a form of marriage market, with the girls being raised by the slave traders as "apprentices" for marriage and then sold to become the wives or concubines of rich men. The purported willingness to be sold to a rich man and thus escape the poverty of the Caucasus did not apply only to "marriage" as such: concubinage was more common and often a preliminary stage of marriage, but was also seen as social advancement, and the demand for concubines on the Ottoman Middle East slave market grew significantly during the 18th century. A common claim was also that Circassian girls were seen laughing and joking at the slave market, which was seen as another sign that they participated willingly.

The official policy of the Russians since 1805 was to abolish the slave trade in their newly conquered territories, and thus the Circassian slave trade or Caucasian slave trade was officially and gradually abolished as the Russian conquest of the Caucasus progressed between the early 1800s and the 1860s. In the Treaty of Adrianople, the Russians were given control over the Ottoman forts along the Black Sea coast between Anatolia and the Caucasus, significantly reducing the Circassian slave trade, which caused the price of white women on the markets of Constantinople and Cairo to skyrocket. In the 1840s, the Ottoman Empire agreed to stop their attacks on Russian forts along the Black Sea in exchange for the Russians turning a blind eye to the Circassian slave trade in now Russian Caucasus, which the Russians agreed to silently tolerate.

In 1854, the Ottoman Empire banned the slave trade in white women after pressure from Great Britain and France. However, in March 1858 the Ottoman governor of Trapezunt informed the British Consul that the 1854 ban had been a temporary war time ban due to foreign pressure, and that he had been given orders to allow slave ships on the Black Sea pass on their way to Constantinople, and in December formal tax regulations was introduced, legitimizing the Circassian slave trade again.

Between 1856 and 1866, at least half a million Circassians were exiled from the Caucasus by the Russians. The Circassian refugee colonies in Anatolia and Constantinople continued to sell girls, in this case, Circassians are noted to have sold the children of their own Circassian slaves or serfs directly to the Ottoman slave traders, or to the buyers themselves. The New York Daily Times reported on August 6, 1856:

There has been lately an unusually large number of Circassians going about the streets of Constantinople. [...] They are here as slave dealers, charged with the disposal of the numerous parcels of Circassian girls that have been for some time pouring into this market. Perceiving that when the Russians shall have reoccupied the coast of the Caucasus this traffic in white slaves will be over, the Circassian dealers have redoubled their efforts ever since the commencement of the peace conferences to introduce into Turkey the greatest possible number of women while the opportunity of doing so lasted. They have been so successful, notwithstanding the prohibition of the trade by the Porte, and the presence of so many of Her Majesty's ships in the Black Sea, that never, perhaps, at any former period, was white human flesh so cheap as it is at this moment.

After 1854, almost all concubines in the Ottoman harem were of Circassian origin; the Circassians had been expelled from Russian-controlled lands in the 1860s, and the impoverished refugee parents sold their daughters in a trade that was tolerated despite being formally banned.

The slave trade from the Caucasus itself also continued. In 1872–1873, British sources and press reported that Circassian slaves were now transported over the Black Sea via regular ships – some of whom owned by European companies – from Black Sea ports such as Trabzon and Samsun to Constantinople.

In 1873, there were many Circassian slave women in Istanbul who were sold by their Circassian immigrant slave owners to Ottoman citizens but escaped and tried to sue the government for their freedom, and a contemporary report described: "Being slaves of Circassian immigrants and being sold by their owners to buyers in Istanbul, most slave women, after being sold, are applying to the government with claims of freedom", and how these women were kept in the homes of officials until their a court of law could determine if they could be free or was legally slaves. Some women who applied for freedom to a legal court were indeed manumitted, but being a free single woman in an Islamic society created significant difficulties, unless she was able to be given protection by a family who could arrange a marriage for her.

Officially, slave trade was prohibited in the Ottoman Empire by the Kanunname of 1889, but this was mainly an issue of international diplomacy and not actually in practice, though the open slave markets disappeared and the slave purchases came to be officially termed "adoptions". There was a greater reluctance from Ottoman authorities to prohibit the Circassian slave trade than the African slave trade, because the Circassian slave trade was regarded as in effect a marriage market, and it continued until the end of the Ottoman Empire (1922). The Ottoman elite disliked free employed female servants and preferred slave maids, and while the slaves of the Ottoman Imperial Harem was officially freed in 1909, the rest of the Ottoman elite kept their own household slaves. The final remnants of slavery as a legal institution in the Ottoman Empire ended with its dissolution in the early 1920s.

=== Slave market ===
Constantinople was the center of the Circassian slave trade. From the Disestablishment of the Istanbul Slave Market in 1846 onward, white slave girls were no longer sold in the open slave market such as the Avret Pazarları, but to the buyer directly in the residence of the slave trader. The Circassian girls were bought by the slave traders very young, were raised by the slave trader and his family as "foster daughters" to become ideal wives, and sold via a "marriage broker" to the buyer for money in the residence of the slave trader. The hidden nature of the Circassian slave trade made it invisible to foreign diplomats, and exposed it to less public criticism than the more open African slave trade.

The Circassian slave trade was considered a luxury trade. White women were sold for six times as much as the ethnic category that was regarded as second best, the Galla (Oromo) women from Abyssinia, who sold for between a tenth or a 3rd of the price of a white woman, depending on how light her skin was.

The preference of white girls over African girls as sex slaves was noted by the international press, when the slave market was flooded by white girls in the 1850s due to the Circassian genocide, which resulted in the price for white slave girls to become cheaper and Muslim men who were not able to buy white girls before now exchanged their black slave women for white ones. The New York Daily Times reported on August 6, 1856:

In former times a "good middling" Circassian girl was thought very cheap at 100 pounds, but at the present moment the same description of goods may be had for 5 pounds! [...] Formerly a Circassian slave girl was pretty sure of being bought into a good family, where not only good treatment, but often rank and fortune awaited her; but at present low rates she may be taken by any huxter who never thought of keeping a slave before. Another evil is that the temptation to possess a Circassian girl at such low prices is so great in the minds of the Turks that many who cannot afford to keep several slaves have been sending their blacks to market, in order to make room for a newly-purchased white girl. The consequence is that numbers of black women, after being as many as eight or ten years in the same hands, have lately been consigned to the broker for disposal. Not a few of those wretched creatures are in a state quite unfit for being sold. I have it on the authority of a respectable slave-broker that at the present moment there have been thrown on the market unusually large numbers of negresses in the family way, some of them even slaves of pashas and men of rank. He finds them so unsalable that he has been obliged to decline receiving any more. A single observation will explain the reason of this, which might appear strange when compared with the value that is attached even to an unborn black baby in some slave countries. In Constantinople it is evident that there is a very large number of negresses living and having habitual intercourse with their Turkish masters—yet it is a rare thing to see a mulatto. What becomes of the progeny of such intercourse? I have no hesitation in saying that it is got rid of by infanticide, and that there is hardly a family in Stanboul where infanticide is not practiced in such cases as a mere matter of course, and without the least remorse or dread.

White women slaves were primarily bought to become wives or concubines (sex slaves) for rich men. To buy a daughter-in-law was seen as a good alternative when arranging a marriage, since she was likely to become a humble wife, lacking both her own money as well as relatives, and completely dependent upon her new family. Since white women were very expensive on the slave market, this essentially functioned as a marriage market for the upper classes, and many of the consorts of the Ottoman and Egyptian rulers and other rich men were former victims of the Circassian slave trade, which made it a sensitive subject for Western diplomats to criticize. During the entire 19th century, many consorts of the Ottoman sultans were described as Circassian women who had been entrusted to the harem as children and brought up as foster daughters of the female family members of the Ottoman dynasty, and then presented to the Ottoman Imperial Harem, where they became the consorts – a euphemism for slave concubines – to the Ottoman sultans. The slave concubines in the Qajar harem in Iran were also Georgian and Armenian girls, some war captives, but also bought on the slave markets and presented as gifts to the shah from the provinces.

The Circassian slave trade was maintained in the early 20th century under the guise of a marriage market. The American journalist E. Alexander Powell described the slave trade to the harems of North African Maghreb in 1912, that when a rich Muslim man wished to enlarge his harem:

...he applies to one of the well-known dealers in Tetuan, Tripoli or Trebizond, a marriage contract is drawn up, and all the ceremonies of legal wedlock are gone through by proxy. By resorting to these fictitious marriages and similar subterfuges, the owner of a harem may procure as many slaves, white, brown or black, as he wishes, and once they are within the walls of his house, no one can possibly interfere to release them, for, the police being under no conditions permitted to violate the privacy of a harem, there is obviously no safeguard for the liberty, or even the lives, of its inmates. As a result of this system, a constant stream of female slaves – fair-haired beauties from Georgia and Circassia, brown-skinned Arab girls from the borders of the Sahara, and negresses from Equatoria – trickles in to the North African coast towns by various roundabout channels, and though the European officials are perfectly well aware of this condition of things, they are powerless to end it. The women thus obtained, though nominally wives, are in reality slaves, for they are bought for money, they are not consulted about their sale, they cannot go away if they are discontented, and their very lives are at the disposal of their masters. If that is not slavery, I don't know what is.

However, the Circassian slave trade did not exclusively trade in female slaves. During the Qajar dynasty of Iran, slave soldiers, ghilman, were still used for the royal guard, and they were mainly white slaves from Caucasus. The 1828 war with Russia put an end to the import of white slaves from the Russian Empire borderlands as it undermined the trade in Circassians and Georgians, which caused the end of slave military in Iran, when free Iranians were employed in the royal guard instead of the still available African slaves.

Girls from the Caucasus and the Circassian colonies in Anatolia were still trafficked to the Middle East in the 1920s. In 1924, the law prohibited the enslavement of white girls (normally Armenian or Georgian) on Kuwaiti territory, but in 1928 at least 60 white slave girls were discovered. It became more and more rare to find white girls in the slave trade from the mid-19th century onward, and was gradually replaced by light skin women from Africa and Asia, a slave trade that continued until the 1960s and 1970s, when slavery in Saudi Arabia, slavery in the United Arab Emirates and Slavery in Oman was finally banned.

== Gallery ==
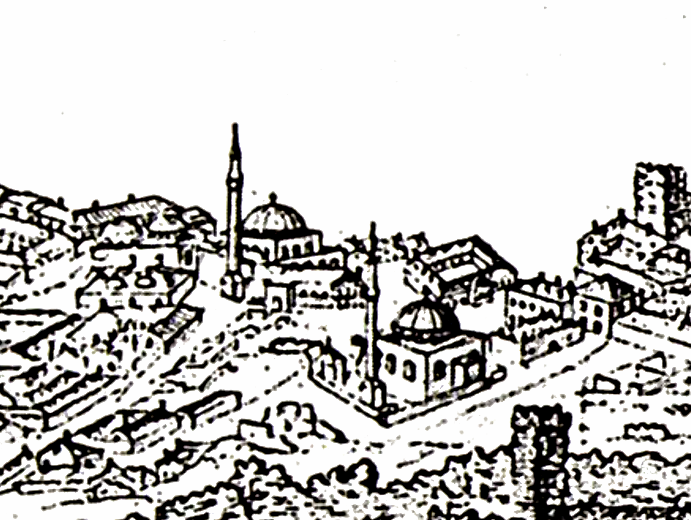
Caffa in ca 1800.

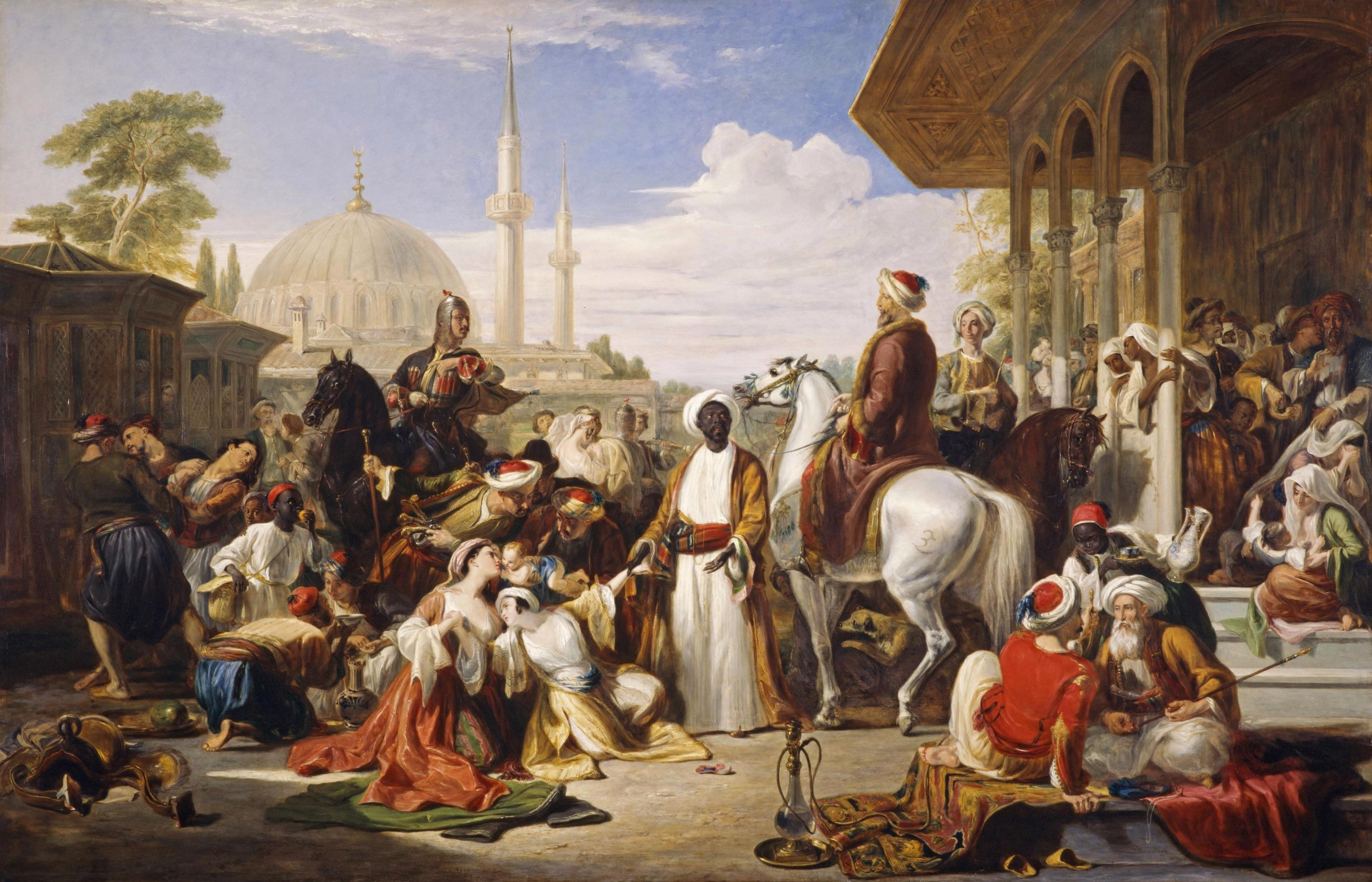
William Allan (1782–1850) - The Slave Market, Constantinople.

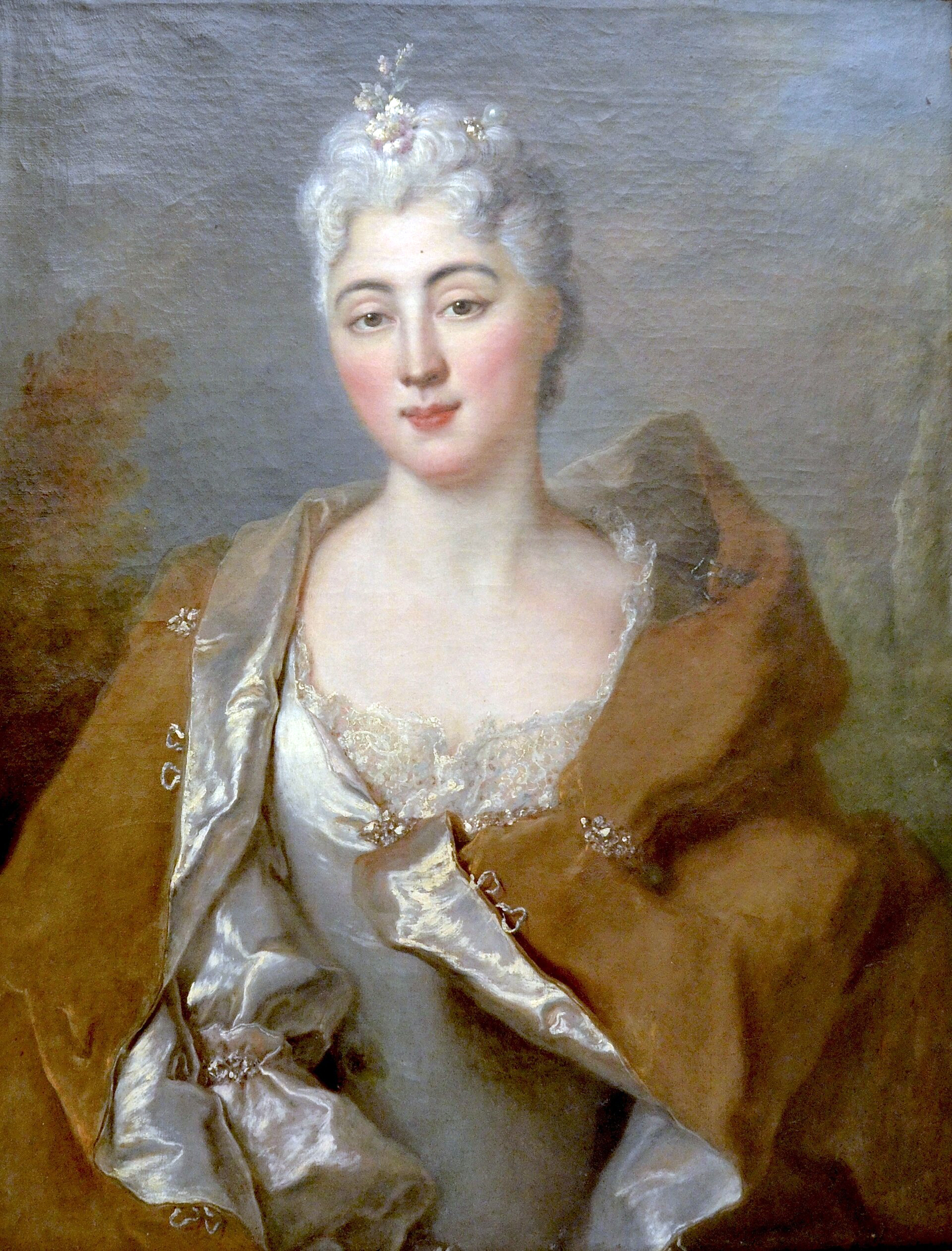
Charlotte Aïssé, victim of the Crimean slave trade.

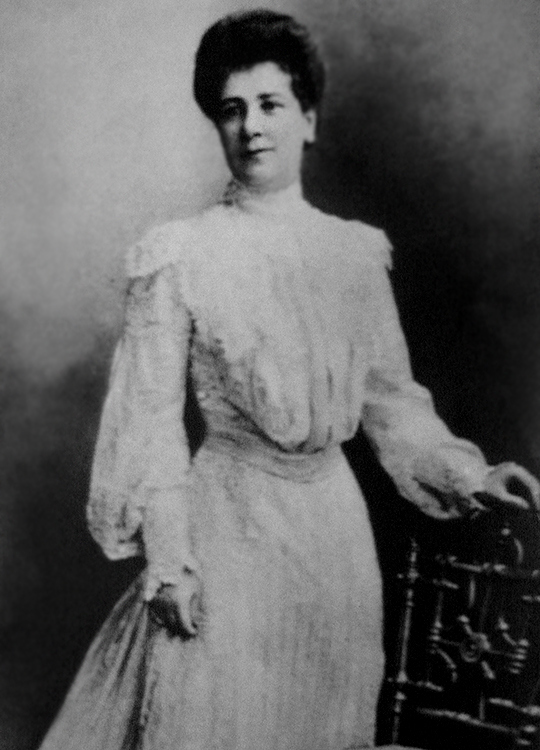
Neshedil Qadin, victim of the Circassian slave trade.

== See also ==
- That Most Precious Merchandise: The Mediterranean Trade in Black Sea Slaves, 1260-1500
- Slavery in Russia
- Avret Pazarları
- Kazakh Khanate slave trade
- Balkan slave trade
- History of slavery in the Muslim world
- Human trafficking in the Middle East
- Turkish Abductions
- Slavery in the Ottoman Empire
