= Slavery in Bosnia and Herzegovina =

Slavery in Bosnia and Herzegovina refer to the history of slavery in the area that was later to form the nation of Bosnia and Herzegovina.

In Ancient Bosnia and Herzegovina, the institution of slavery in the area was a part of the history of slavery in the Roman Empire. During the early middle ages, Bosnia and Herzegovina was subjected to the laws of the Byzantine Empire. During the later part of the middle ages, Bosnia and Herzegovina was independent and regulated slavery by its own laws.

During the Ottoman conquest of the Balkans, Bosnia and Herzegovina became a religious and political border zone between Christian Europe and the Islamic Ottoman Empire, and as a consequence the inhabitants was termed as infidels kafir of Dar al-Harb and vulnerable to Ottoman slave raids and slave trading. During the Ottoman era, slavery was legal in accordance to Islamic law. As a non-Muslim province, Bosnia and Herzegovina was also subjected to the blood tax of tributary slaves to the Ottoman Empire. The Ottoman era in Bosnia and Herzegovina ended in 1908, after which Ottoman law was no longer applicable.

== History ==
In Ancient Bosnia and Herzegovina, slavery was practiced by the Illyrians. During the temure of Roman rule in Bosnia and Herzegovina, slavery was regulated in accordance with the laws of slavery in the Roman Empire.

=== Middle ages ===
Bosnia and Herzegovina was under the rule of the Byzantine Empire from the 4th century to the 7th century. During this time period, the institution of slavery in Bosnia and Herzegovina was regulated by the laws governing the institution of slavery in the Byzantine Empire. During the Byzantine campaign against the Pagan tribes on Balkan in the 10th century, slavery in the Byzantine Empire reached it maximum, when it was supplied by Pagan war captives.

While slavery in the Byzantine Empire was never formally abolished, it was gradually phased out in favor of serfdom by the landowners in the countryside, which eventually reduced slavery to become a marginal urban phenomena after the 10th century onward.

During the Middle Ages, Bosnia and Herzegovina was ruled by two independent states: Banate of Bosnia (1154–1377) and Kingdom of Bosnia (1377–1463).

==== Bosnian slave trade ====
From the 7th century to the 15th century, Bosnia was targeted as a supply source of the Balkan slave trade. It was the perhaps biggest sources for slaves to the Venetian slave trade, which provided primarily the Middle East and Islamic Egypt with European kafir slaves, as well as Italy and Spain with ancillae slavemaids.

The slave trade thus organized alongside religious principles. While Christians did not enslave Christians, and Muslims did not enslave Muslims, both did allow the enslavement of people they regarded to be heretics, which for example allowed Catholic Christians to enslave Orthodox Christians, and Sunni Muslims to enslave Shia Muslims.

The slave trade was founded upon the fact that the Balkans was a religious border zone between at first pagan and Christian, and later Catholic and Orthodox Christian lands. Since the custom at the time did not approve of enslaving people of the same religion, this made the Balkans a supply of slaves for both Christian and Muslim lands. Another factor was the fact that the Balkans was for a long time politically decentralized and unstable, and was in the Early Middle Ages known as the Sclaveni or Slav lands. These two factors in combination made the Balkans a fertile target for slave trade, when war captives were sold by their enemies to Venetian slave traders at the coasts.

The most targeted category of the slave trade were the Bosnians, since they were adherents of Bogomilism, a faith which was not acknowledged as Christianity and therefore made them legitimate targets of slavery in Catholic as well as Orthodox Europe.

The Republic of Venice used Ragusa as one of their most important bases and middlemen in the Ancient Balkan slave trade, in which Slavs from the Balkans were trafficked to the ports of the Adriatic coast and sold to Venetian merchants. The Venetian merchants of the Venetian slave trade used Ragusa as a base where they purchased slaves and transported them across the Adriatic Sea to the slave market in the Aegean Sea, where they were sold on to either slavery in Spain in the West or slavery in Egypt in the South.

In the late 13th century between 50 and 200 slaves termed as servi (male) and ancillae (female) were imported to Ragusa from the surrounding Slavic-speaking regions were every year. The Slavic slaves had sometimes been sold by their families or kidnapped and sold by warlords, landlords, merchants, or citizens of the surrounding territories.

Most of the slaves were children or young women from Bosnia who belonged to the Bogomil faith, whose religion were not recognized as Christian by Catholics or Orthodox, and therefore viewed as legitimate to enslave and trade.

Some of the slaves were sold in Ragusa where they worked or were rented out to private households, but others were sold on the slave traders and trafficked on cargo vessels across the Adriatic Sea to Venice, Apulia and Sicily in Italy; to Catalonia in Spain; or Palestine and Egypt and Slavery in the Mamluk Sultanate.

The Balkan slave trade entered difficulties in the 15th century. The Republic of Ragusa banned the slave trade from Ragusa, one of the major sea ports of the Balkan slave trade, in 1416. The Venetian slave trade from the Balkans gradually ended in parallel with the conquest of the Balkans by the Ottoman Empire during the 15th century. The slave trade from the Balkans was ended as a separate slave trade and was overtaken by the Ottomans and incorporated into the Ottoman slave trade, which in the Balkans was connected to the Black Sea slave trade.

=== Ottoman Bosnia and Herzegovina ===
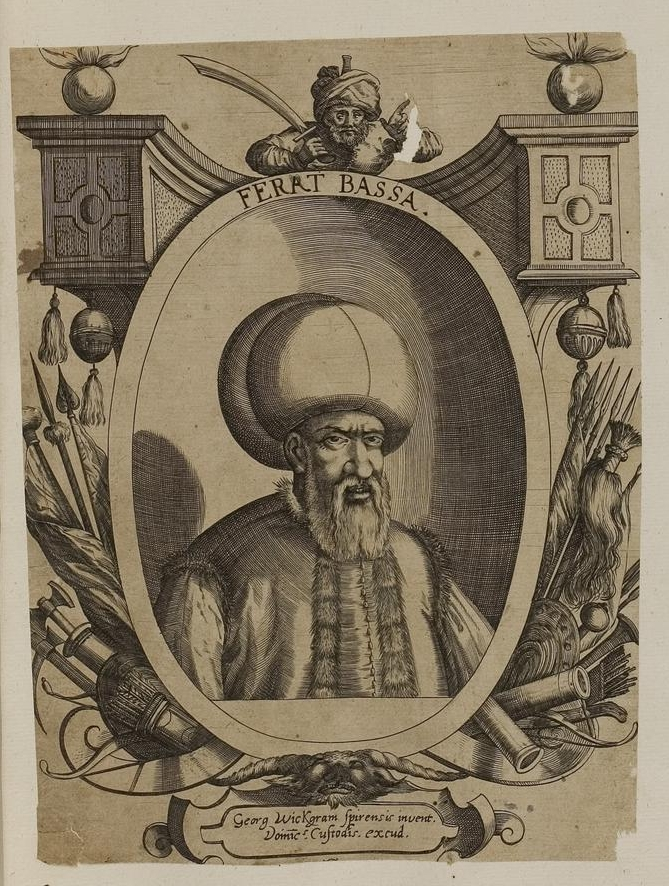
Ferhat-paša Sokolović

During the time period when Bulgaria was a province of the Ottoman Empire, the practice of slavery in Ottoman Bosnia and Herzegovina (1463–1908) was governed by the Islamic law that regulated the institution of slavery in the Ottoman Empire.

Ottoman Bosnia and Herzegovina was subjected to Ottoman law. Slavery in the Ottoman Empire was regulated by the Seriat, the religious Islamic Law, and by the secular Sultan's law Kanun, which was essentially supplementary regulations to facilitate the implementation of the Seriat law. The Islamic law regarding Islamic views on slavery legitimized enslavement by purchase of already enslaved people from middleman slave traders; by children born from two enslaved parents or from a slave mother without an acknowledged father; or by enslaving war captives, specifically kafir of Dar al-Harb, that is non-Muslims from non-Muslim lands, with whom Muslims of Dar al-Islam (the Muslim world) were by definition always in a state of war. A Muslim man was by law entitled to have sexual intercourse with his female slave (concubinage in Islam) without this being defined as extramarital sex (zina); if he chose to acknowledge paternity of a child with her the child would become free, and his mother would become umm walad and manumitted on the death of her enslaver; but if he did not acknowledge paternity both the child and mother would remain slaves, continuing the line of slavery.

As in other non-Muslim Ottoman provinces in the Balkans, Bosnia and Herzegovina was subjected to the blood tax of slaves known as the Devshirme system. The system had been introduced by Murad II, and was imposed upon the Christian provinces of the Balkans when the Ottomans felt a need to increase their slave supply of Palace state slaves or slave soldier (janissaries). When the Ottomans needed to increase their slave supply, Ottoman officials travelled to Christian villages, demanded a list from the village priest of the baptised boys of the village, and selected one son from each family: boys that were healthy, intelligent, uncircumcised and beautiful were prioritized for selection. There are claims of very poor families who villingly offered their children, but in general, Christian families tried to avoid having their children taken as slaves. Only non-Muslim families were subjected to the slave tax and Muslim families were protected from it; however there are examples of Muslim families who lamented that their sons could not be taken to serve the Sultan, and from Bosnia, som examples are known of Muslim families managing to include their own sons in the slave batches. Boys taken during this system were subjected to a long training during which they became Islamicized and fostered to loyalty to the Sultan. Ferhat-paša Sokolović and Handan Sultan were reportedy among the most known examples of the people enslaved in Bosnia.

However, in practice there are examples of non-Muslims being enslaved outside of the Devshirme-system. Primarily this appear to have been done by the Ottoman Governors and officials, who could enslave children, including girls, provided they were not Muslim. In 1850 a case attracted attention in Austria in which a Christian Bosnian slave girl, Mara Illić, were kept in Austria when her Ottoman enslaver left the country on the request of her brother Milan Illić, who claimed that they had both been enslaved as children (being non-Muslim) and forced to convert to Islam after their enslavement; he himself had been freed earlier, and now demanded the liberation of his sister. The case attracted a great deal of attention, but ultimately ended in the liberation of Mara Illić in 1852.

Chattel slavery was nominally restricted in the Ottoman Empire by the Kanunname of 1889, but it remained tolerated in the Ottoman Empire, and consequently legal in Bosnia and Herzegovina, until the end of Ottoman rule in 1908.

== See also ==
- Balkan slave trade
- Venetian slave trade
