= Slavery in Hungary =

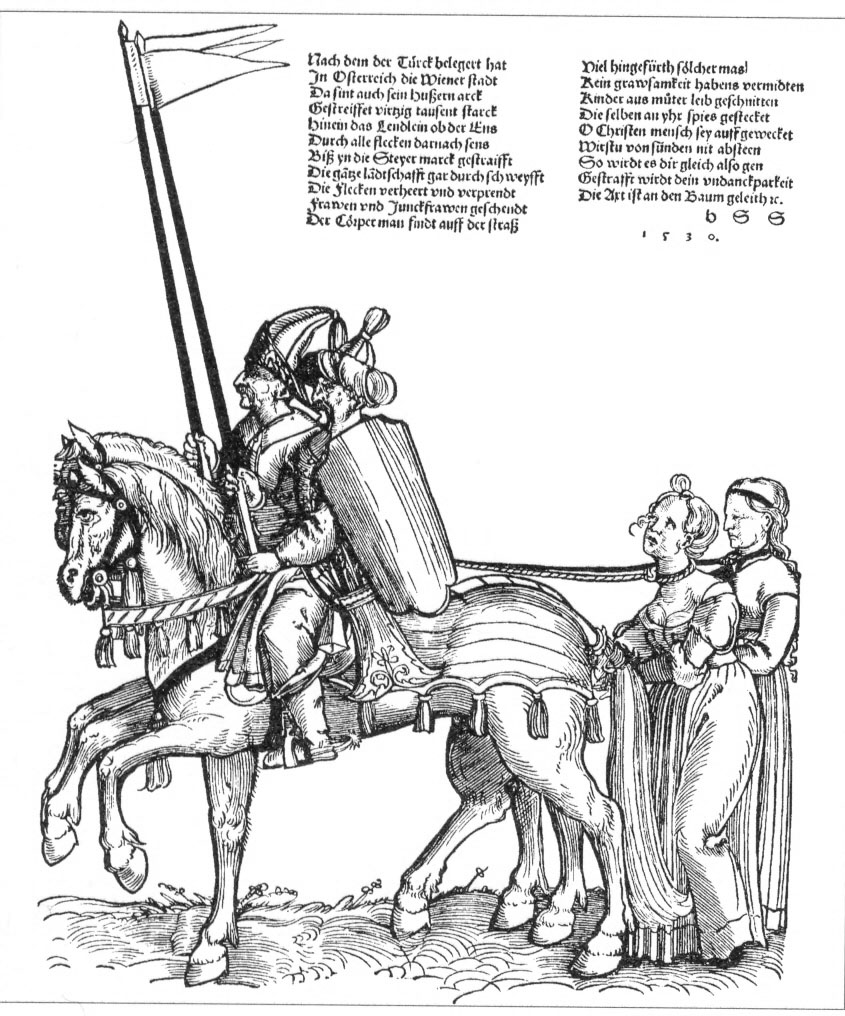
Turkish raiders carry captives tied to slave belts

Slavery in Hungary existed in different forms in Hungary until the late early modern age. Slavery is known from what later became Hungary from the slavery in the Roman Province of Pannonia. In the Middle Ages the Hungarian peasantry were enslaved under the Magyar landlords and called servi. The Magyars also participated as suppliers of Slavic war captives to the Black Sea slave trade. During the 13th century, chattel slavery was phased out in Hungary and transformed in to serfdom.

After the Ottoman conquest and during the era of Ottoman Hungary, chattel slavery was again legal in Hungary. Hungary was subjected to slave raids and many Hungarians were trafficked to the Crimean slave trade in the Black Sea and slavery in the Ottoman Empire. During Austrian rule, chattel slavery were no longer legal in Hungary.

== Antiquity ==
Slavery is known in Hungary in antiquity. Hungary was a part of the Roman province Pannonia, and slavery in Pannonia was regulated in accordance with slavery in the Roman Empire and later in slavery in the Byzantine Empire.

== Árpád Hungary ==
Chattel slavery was a big institution in Magyar Árpád Hungary (855-1301). A big part of the population or peasantry of the countryside were legally kept in chattel slavery under the local Magyar lord and landowner. They were referred to as servi (male) or ancilla, as per the old Roman custom. The Hungarian slave or servi peasants could be inherited, bought, owned, sold and manumitted by their Magyar lord and enslaver. Slavery was inherited by birth, but people could also been condemned to slavery as punishment for a crime.

During the 13th century, was gradually phased out and transformed to become serfdom, and the servi slaves were transformed in to become libertini serfs. The transformation from slavery to serfdom were performed by the Hungarian landlords, who in progressively larger numbers started to manumit their servi and make them to serfs, who were termed libertini or libertinus. The serfs in Hungary were by all accounts prior slaves who had been manumitted, which illustrates the transformation from slavery to serfdom.

=== Magyar slave trade ===
The slave trade from the Balkans was mainly directed toward the Balkan slave trade of the Adriatic Sea rather than the Black Sea, which provided the Venetian slave trade with captives. However, in the 9th century, the Magyars of Hungary conducted regular slave raids toward the Slavs and sold their captives to the Byzantine slave traders in the Black Sea port of Kerch in exchange for brocades, wool, and other products, thus acting as suplyers for the Byzantine Black Sea slave trade.

Ahmad ibn Rustah, a 10th-century Persian traveler, remembers it this way:

The Magyar country (Etelköz) is rich in wood and water. The land is well watered and harvests abundant. They lord over all the Slavs who neighbour them and impose a heavy tribute on them. These Slavs are completely at their mercy, like prisoners. The Magyars are Pagans, worshipping fire. They make piratical raids on the Slavs and follow the coast [of the Black Sea] with their captives to a port in Byzantine territory named Karkh.

This slave trade would have ended after the Magyars and their Eastern Slavic neighbors became Christian around the early 11th century, with the Christian church banning Christians from enslaving other Christians.

== Serfdom in Hungary ==
The reason to why the Hungarian landlords chose to transform slavery to serfdom has been a topic of discussion and is not confirmed, but one suggestion is the fact that changes in the agriculture during this time period, in which many landlords owned more split propertires, demanding different ways of land cultivation, made serfdom more financially practical than chattel slavery. This transformation took place during a time period in which chattel slavery were phased out in most of Christian Western Europe due to the rhetoric of the church, who principally disliked Christians enslaving other Christians, and used an anti-slavery rhetoric.

By the 14th century, chattel slavery appears to have died out in Hungary and the transition of the Hungarian peasantry from slavery to serfdom completed. Serfdom in Hungary was however similar to slavery in many ways. In contrast to a servi-slave, a libertini-serf was legally a free citizen, their labor were regulated and they need only work for the landlord during a specific part of the year; however, the libertini could still in effect be inherited, bought and sold, and had a legal obligation to work for their landlord, although their work was now regulated.

== Ottoman Hungary ==
After the fall of Constantinople in 1453, Hungary became a religious border zone and a border state between the growing Islamic Ottoman Empire and Christian Europe. This caused Hungary to become a warzone in the subsequent wars between the Ottoman Empire and Christian Europe. This also caused Hungarians to became victims of enslavement in accordance with Islamic law, which defined non-Muslims from non-Muslim lands as kafirs of Dar al-Harb and therefore legitimate for Muslims to enslave.

After the Battle of Mohács (1526), the Ottoman army pillaged Hungary on the way to Buda, during which men were massacres and women captured, raped and sold as slaves.

In Ottoman Hungary (1541–1699), Hungary was a province of the Ottoman Empire. Now subjected to Ottoman law, chattel slavery was again legal in Hungary, and managed in accordance with the laws of slavery in the Ottoman Empire.

After the final Ottoman conquest of Hungary in 1541, there were frequent border raids by Ottoman and Crimean troops toward Christian border lands, during which civilian were killed or captured, marched away and sold in to slavery in the Ottoman Empire at the slave markets of Istanbul and Sarajevo.

Between 1522 and 1717, Tatar troops from the Crimean Khanate often participated in the Ottoman campaigns in the Hungarian border zones, and during these campaigns they would often capture slaves in Hungary and Austria; the long way back to the Crimea did provide opportunity for prisoners to escape, but many were abducted to Crimea, where they were either ransomed (if they were rich), or (if they were poor) sold on the Crimean slave trade.

Ottoman Hungary was subjected to Ottoman law. Slavery in the Ottoman Empire was regulated by the Seriat, the religious Islamic Law, and by the secular Sultan's law Kanun, which was essentially supplementary regulations to facilitate the implementation of the Seriat law. The Islamic law legitimized enslavement by purchase of already enslaved people from middleman slave traders; by children born from two enslaved parents or from a slave mother without an acknowledged father; or by enslaving war captives, specifically kafir of Dar al-Harb, that is non-Muslims from non-Muslim lands, with whom Muslims of Dar al-Islam (the Muslim world) were by definition always in a state of war. A Muslim man was by law entitled to have sexual intercourse with his female slave (concubinage in Islam) without this being defined as extramarital sex (zina); if he chose to acknowledge paternity of a child with her the child would become free, and his mother would become umm walad and manumitted on the death of her enslaver; but if he did not acknowledge paternity both the child and mother would remain slaves, continuing the line of slavery.

=== Ottoman-Hungarian slave trade ===
The Crimean slave raids to the Balkans were conducted in collaboration with the Ottomans or with Ottoman approval. Since the majority of the Balkans were under Ottoman Suzerainty, and Islamic law banned the enslavement of people living under Islamic rule, r. Raids were conducted when the various territories were in conflict with the Ottoman Empire, and thus defined as enemy territory, Dar al-Harb.

During the 16th and 17th century, Hungary was a religious and political border zone between Christianity and Islam. Hungary was divided in to Ottoman Hungary, the Kingdom of Hungary that was under Austrian rule (later Slovakia) and the Principality of Transylvania. The Austrian, Transylvanian and Ottoman authorities had manned the border lands with forts and frontier soldiers, and the frontier border lands was under almost constant warfare and military conflict during the 16th and 17th century. By Islamic law, it was legal for Muslims to enslave kafir from Dar al-Harb (non-Muslims from non-Muslim lands), and the Ottoman-Hungarian slave trade along the religious frontiers had grown in to a veritable industry by the mid 17th century. The border slave raids not only captured people to supply the Ottoman slave market, but also made money by offering the people captured during their slave raids for ransom, an activity that increased the slave raids until its most intense phase during the 1650s and 1670s.

Between 1521 and 1717, the Crimean Khanate conducted slave raids to Hungary in collaboration with or with permission from the Ottoman Empire during the warfare between the Ottoman Empire and the Habsburg monarchy.

During the war between the Ottoman Empire and the Principality of Transylvania in the 1660s, the Crimean Khanate conducted raids as far West as Moravia.

During the Battle of Vienna in 1683, the Ottoman troops abducted many civilians into slavery in the Ottoman Empire; not only from Austria, but also from Hungarian border lands. Normally, the Ottomans killed adult men and preferred to enslave women and children, but men were enslaved as well. In total, 57,220 people were kidnapped and taken away as slaves during the Ottoman pillage of the Austrian and Hungarian border zone in 1683; 6,000 men, 11,215 married women, 14,922 unmarried women under the age of 26 (of which 204 were noblewomen); and 26,093 children.

During the Austrians conquest of Hungary from the Ottomans between 1683 and 1699, the entire Ottoman Hungary became a Dar al-Harb border zone and many Hungarians were abducted to slavery among other pillaging. In November 1686, the noble county of Pest complained to Palatine Pal Esterhazy that: "in the last few years, many have been consumed by the pagan Tursk and Tatars and their weapons and slavery, hile others have died at the hands of hunger, terrible desitutiton and unbearable penury, or have scattered to distant lands".

The last Crimean slave raid to Hungary was conducted in 1717, during which 1,464 people were captured in the Ugocsa County, 861 of whom succeeded in escaping from the caravan going back to the Crimea.

Preserved documentation does not clearly provide the place of origin for the majority of the slaves to the Ottoman Imperial Harem, but it is clear that some of the European female slaves were from Greece, Hungary, Poland, Wallachia, and Malta, some of whom were acquired from local Ottoman governors, though more Circassian, Georgian, Abkhasian, and Russian (meaning the arrived via the Crimean slave trade).

== Hungary under Austrian rule ==
Ottoman Hungary became a part of Austria in 1699-1867. Austria had no chattel slavery, and no chattel slavery was therefore legal in Hungary. Serfdom in Hungary was abolished via the Serfdom Patent (1781).

There were cases in which Hungarians fell victim to slave trade to other countries. The woman who became the explorer Lady Florence Baker left Hungary for the Ottoman Empire, settling in Vidin. There, she was sold for slavery in the Ottoman Empire in 1859. Samuel Baker encountered her during a visit to the Vidin white slave auction.

== Gallery ==
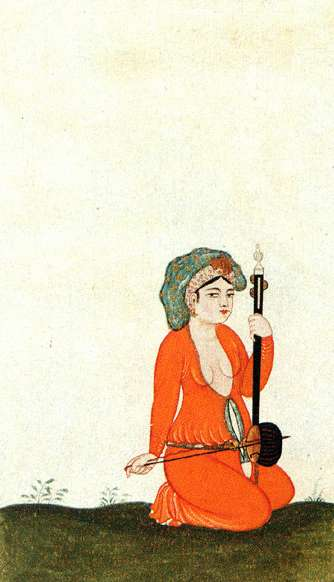
Slave woman musician in Ottoman Hungary

== See also ==
- Balkan slave trade
- Venetian slave trade
- Slavery in the Republic of Ragusa
