= Genoese slave trade =

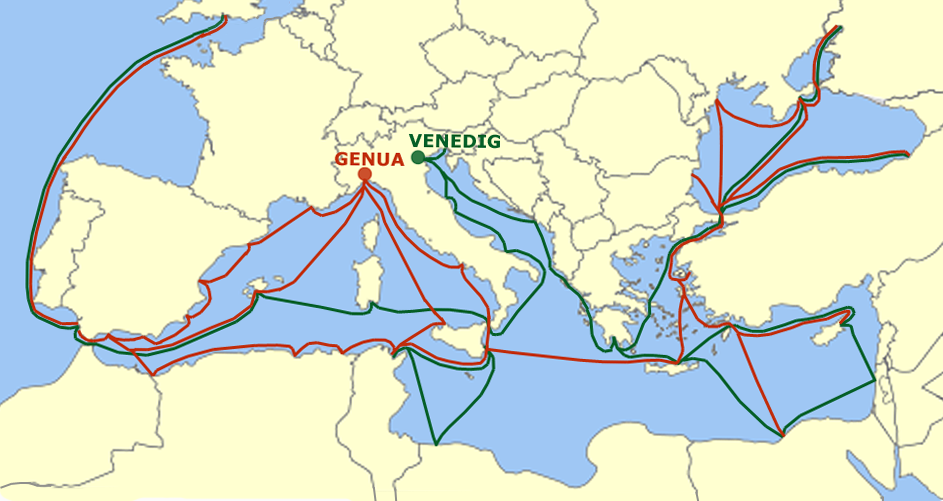
Maritime republics of Genoa (red) and Venice (green) and their trade routes in the Mediterranean region.

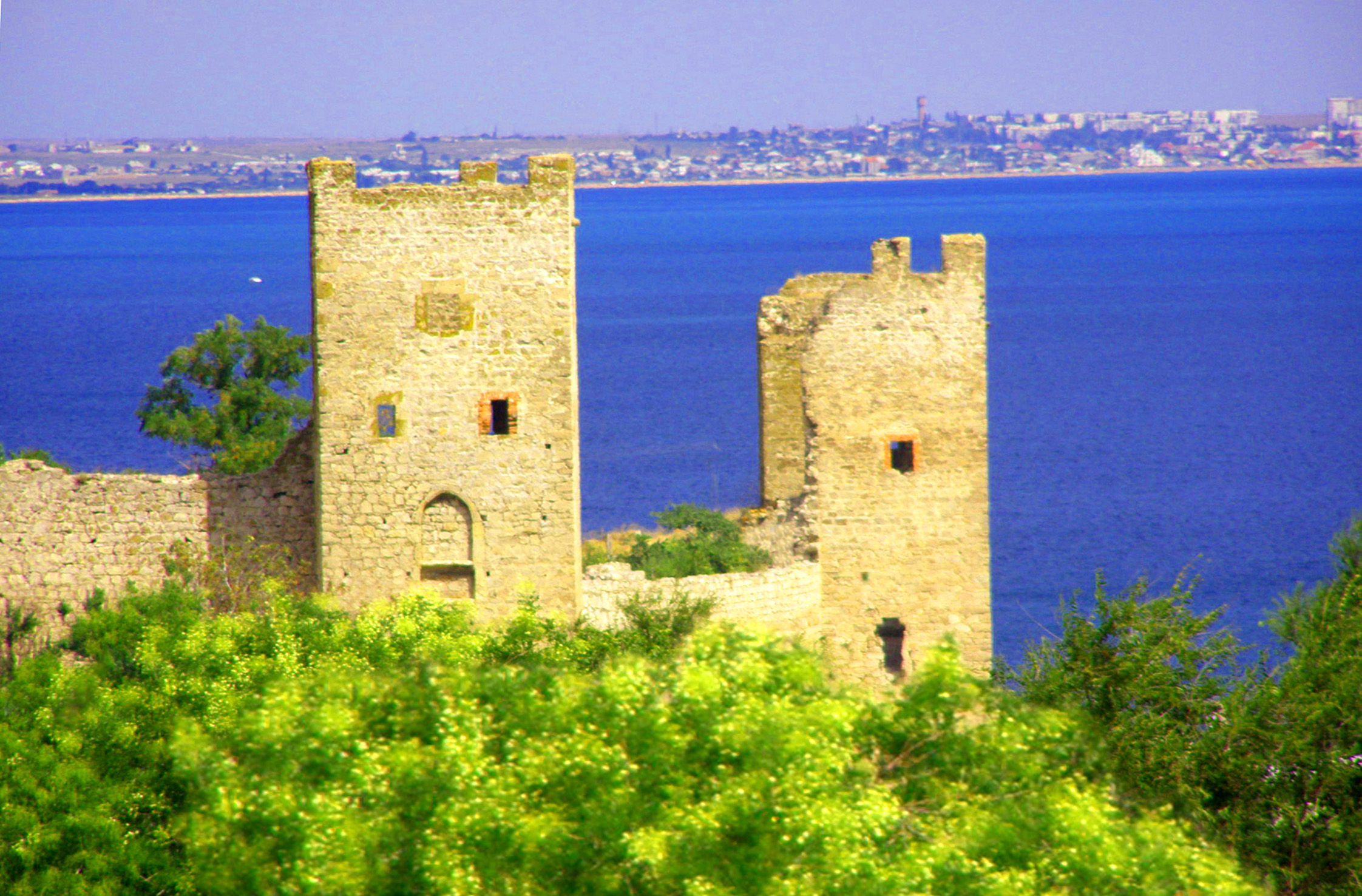
Caffa.

The Genoese slave trade refers to the slave trade conducted by the Republic of Genoa, which was a major business during primarily the Middle Ages.

In the 13th century, the Genoese established colonies in Crimea, and acquired slaves of various religions to sell to either Southern Europe via Crete and the Balearic Islands, or to the Middle East directly via the Black Sea. The Genoese met competition in the Venetian slave trade of the Republic of Venice.

The Black Sea slave trade was closed off from Genoa due to the conquests of the Ottoman Empire in the 15th century and integrated in to the Ottoman slave trade, specifically via the Black Sea slave trade. This ended the old import routes of slaves to Europe, which contributed to the development of the Atlantic slave trade to provide the European colonies in America with slave labor.

After the end of the Black Sea slave trade, Genoa also took part in the Atlantic slave trade.

== Background ==
During the Middle Ages, informal slave zones were formed alongside religious borders. Both Christians and Muslims banned the enslavement of people of their own faith, but both approved of the enslavement of people of a different faith.

The slave trade thus organized alongside religious principles. While Christians did not enslave Christians, and Muslims did not enslave Muslims, both viewed the enslavement of people they regarded to be heretics or schismatics as legitimate, which allowed Catholic Christians to enslave Orthodox Christians, and Sunni Muslims to enslave Shia Muslims.

There was still a market for slavery in medieval Europe in the early Middle Ages, but it gradually started to be phased out in favor of serfdom. However, there was a major market for slavery in the Islamic Middle East, and European slaves were referred to in the Muslim world as saqaliba. The Republic of Venice was one of the early suppliers of saqaliba slaves to the Muslim world, having organized in the Balkan slave trade, and Genoa was to become its primary rival.

Slavery died out in Western Europe after the 12th century, but the demand for laborers after the Black Death resulted in a revival of slavery in Southern Europe in Italy and in Spain, as well as an increase in the demand for captives to slavery in Egypt.

== Black Sea slave trade ==
Italian merchants, particularly the Genoese and Venetians, who had a large web of contacts as traders in the Mediterranean Sea, early established themselves in the Black Sea slave trade. Initially they did so as traveling merchants, but eventually they managed to acquire their own trading colonies in the Crimea.

In the 13th century, Byzantine control in the Crimea weakened by the fall of Constantinople 1204, and Italian trade colonies took control over the Black Sea slave trade, with the Republic of Venice establishing in Sudak in the Crimea in 1206 and later in Tana, and the Republic of Genoa in Caffa in 1266.

The majority of the slaves in the Italian Black Sea slave trade came to be enslaved via three main methods; as war captives during warfare, such as the Mongol invasions, the wars between the Golden Horde and the Ilkhanate, and the conquests of Timur Lenk; via slave raids; or through parents selling their own children or relatives to slavery, which occurred because of poverty and was a regular and common occurrence especially after the Black Death, when the demand for slaves was high in both Southern Europe and the Middle East.

Common targets of slavery were pagan Finno-Ugric and Turkish people.

In parallel with the establishment of the Italian colonies in the Crimea, the Mongol Empire conquered Russia, and the Italian Black Sea slave trade expanded in parallel with the Mongol warfare, with the Mongols encouraging the trade, using it to dispose of particularly Russian slaves; up until the Russian uprising of 1262, for example, the Mongols sold Russian peasants who were unable to pay tribute to the Italian slave traders in the Crimea.

=== Slave market ===
The slave market were divided into two. Southern Europe were supplied with male slaves for hard labor or female slaves for domestic house work as enslaved maidservants. The Islamic market of the Middle East requested female slaves as domestic house slaves or for sexual slavery as harem concubines; castrated male slaves for eunuchs or intact male slaves for military slavery as slave soldiers.

The Black Sea slave trade was, alongside the Balkan slave trade, one of the two main slave supply sources of future Mamluk soldiers to slavery in the Mamluk Sultanate in Egypt. A smaller number of slaves were sold in Italy and Spain as enslaved domestic servants, called ancillae.

The Italian Black Sea slave trade had two main routes; from the Crimea to Byzantine Constantinople, and via Crete and the Balearic Islands to Italy and Spain; or to the Mamluk Sultanate in Egypt, which received the majority of the slaves.

From at least 1382 onward, the majority of the Mamluks of the Egyptian Mamluk Sultanate with slave origin came from the Black Sea slave trade; around a hundred Circassian males intended for Mamluks were being trafficked via the Black Sea slave trade until the nineteenth-century.

The majority of the slaves trafficked to Southern Europe (Italy and Spain) were girls, since they were intended to become ancillae maid servants, while the majority of the slaves, around 2,000 annually, were trafficked to the Egyptian Mamluk Sultanate, in that case most of them boys, since the Mamluk Sultanate needed slave soldiers.

=== End of the slave trade ===
After the fall of Constantinople in 1453, the Ottomans closed the trade between the Crimea and the West. The slave trade gradually diminished, and in 1472, only 300 slaves are registered to have been trafficked from Caffa.

From the 1440s, Spain and Portugal started to import their slaves from first the Canary Islands, and then from Africa; initially via the trans-Saharan slave trade from Libya, and then by starting the Atlantic slave trade.

The Ottoman Empire and the Crimean Khanate conquered the Italian cities in the Crimea in 1475, and the slave trade was then taken over by Muslim slave traders.

== Atlantic slave trade ==
After the end of the Black Sea slave trade, Genoa became involved in the emerging Atlantic slave trade. From about 1520, the Genoese controlled the Spanish port of Panama, the first port on the Pacific, founded by the conquest of the Americas. The Genoese obtained a concession to exploit the port mainly for the slave trade of the new world on the Pacific, which lasted until the sacking and destruction of the original city in 1671.

Until the middle of the 17th century, Mexico was the largest single market for slaves in Spanish America. While the Portuguese were directly involved in trading enslaved peoples to Brazil, the Spanish Empire relied on the Asiento de Negros system, awarding (Catholic) Genoese merchant bankers the license to trade enslaved people from Africa to their colonies in Spanish America. Cartagena, Veracruz, Buenos Aires, and Hispaniola received the majority of slave arrivals, mainly from Angola.

== See also ==
- Slavery in Egypt
- Venetian slave trade
- Slavery in the Abbasid Caliphate
