= Golden Chain Lock of Petershagen =

Roman jewelry, 3rd or 4th century AD

The Golden Chain Lock of Petershagen is a piece of Roman jewelry found in 2023 in the East Westfalian town of Petershagen, district of Frille, county of Minden-Lübbecke. It is believed to date back to the 3rd or 4th century AD. It is a miniature version measuring just 11 × 12 mm (l x ø) and made of gold. The find is unique in Europe in terms of archaeology and art history.

== Discovery and interpretation ==
The lock was found by Constantin Fried, a private explorer and detectorist licensed by the Westphalian State Archaeology Department Landschaftsverband Westfalen-Lippe (LWL), in a field near Petershagen-Frille. He recognized the unique find from its characteristic round shape as a so-called can lock, although such Roman chain locks are usually much larger and made of iron with some bronze components. On the basis of such designs, the LWL archaeologists assume that this miniature lock was made at least 1600 years ago. The can locks that have been found so far, which regularly measure between approx. 3.5 and 7 cm, were used to lock chests or caskets, for example. Also these versions, usually made of iron and bronze, are rarities among the finds known to date.

== Construction ==
The lock case consists of two cylinders, one inner and one outer, which were closed at the top and bottom with lids and fastened with three rivets. The outer cylinder is decorated with two circumferential rows of opposing perforations. However, the key and the lock's chain were not found. Fortunately, the end link of the chain was in the lock case and allowed it to be reconstructed, incidentally, also according to the number of links.

== Research findings and publication ==
This find was subject of intensive further research, including of neutron computed tomography (NCT), which is rarely used in archaeology. The views of the inside of the case showed that this miniature lock once had a functioning mechanism. The sectional images obtained with NCT reveal a base plate, a frame with a spring plate, the bolt, the bolt guide and the key pin. As the mechanism appeared largely complete, but damaged from antiquity, it is assumed by this analysis that the lock was poked around in order unlock it without the key. Based on the images obtained, the shape of the key bit could also be reconstructed. According to further estimations of the LWL experts, this miniature lock probably came to Westphalia as merchandise or looted goods. It is regarded as an evidence of the high level of craftsmanship of provincial Roman artisans and locksmiths, and it may also provide new clues to the relationships between the indigenous Germanic elites in present-day Westphalia and the Roman Empire, as well as to the possible significance of the regions where it was found. After the initial analysis of the find, it was initially presented in a non-public lecture at the annual conference of LWL Archaeology on April 29, 2024. Thereafter, due to further investigations, it was officially published in January 2025.
