= Slavery in the Byzantine Empire =

Slavery was common in the early Roman Empire and Classical Greece. It was legal in the Byzantine Empire but it was transformed significantly from the 4th century onward as slavery came to play a diminished role in the economy.

Laws gradually diminished the power of slaveholders and improved the rights of slaves by restricting a master's right to abuse, prostitute, expose, and kill slaves. Slavery became rare after the first half of 7th century. From 11th century, semi-feudal relations largely replaced slavery.

Byzantium maintained the slaveholding traditions it inherited from the Roman Empire, but these underwent significant changes from the fourth century onward, as slavery played a progressively smaller role in the production of economic surplus. Legislation concerning slavery gradually curtailed the authority of slaveholders and expanded the rights of enslaved people by restricting a master’s ability to abuse, prostitute, abandon, or kill them and their children.

Under the influence of Christianity, views on slavery shifted: by the 10th century slaves were viewed as potential citizens (the slave as a subject), rather than property or chattel (the slave as an object). Slavery was also seen as "an evil contrary to nature, created by man's selfishness", although it remained legal. Slavery was never abolished in the Byzantine Empire, but gradually diminished during the centuries; reaching its maximum in the 10th century, it then transitioned to serfdom in the countryside, and remained only as a minor urban phenomenon at the beginning of the 13th century.

== Slave trade ==
Information about the Byzantine slave trade is fragmentary prior to the 13th century, when it was taken over by Genoese and Venetian merchants, who established colonies in the Crimea in the 13th century, establishing the Genoese slave trade and the Venetian slave trade.

The slave trade trafficking humans from the Black Sea region to the Mediterranean Sea during the Roman period continued during the Byzantine Empire, but the Byzantine slave trade is not fully documented, though it appears to have continued to function via the old principles of taking war-captives as well as children sold by their families.

Various slave routes passed via the Black Sea and the Byzantine Crimea to the Byzantine Mediterranean world and the Islamic Middle East. Different groups of slavers acquired captives and shipped them down to Byzantine Crimea and other ports around the Black Sea, from where they continued to the slave market of the Mediterranean via Byzantine Constantinople, and to the Middle East.

During the Middle Ages, the slave market was organized alongside religious borders. Christian slaves could not be sold in Christian slave markets, and Muslim slaves could not be sold on Muslim slave markets. The slave trade adjusted to this, and the result was that pagans, who could be sold to both Christians and Muslims, came to be highly valued. Pagans from Eastern and Baltic Northern Europe came to be the most popular targets for slavery in both the Byzantine Empire and the Islamic Arab world during the Early Middle Ages, where they were forced to convert to Christianity and Islam respectively after their enslavement.

=== Sources of slaves ===
A main source of slaves were prisoners of war, from which there was a great profit to be made. The Synopsis of Histories mentions that after the Battle of Adrassos many prisoners of war were sent to Constantinople. They were so numerous that they filled all the mansions and rural regions. Most of the domestic servants in large Byzantine homes were slaves and were very numerous. Danielis of Patras, a wealthy widow in the 9th century, gave a gift of 3,000 slaves to Emperor Basil I. The eunuch Basil Lekapenos, Parakoimomenos during the reign of Basil II, was said to have owned 3,000 slaves and retainers. Some slaves worked the landed estates of their masters, which declined in later ages.

A medieval Arab historian estimates that 200,000 women and children were taken as slaves after the Byzantine reconquest of Crete from the Muslims. Yet parents, living in the Byzantine Empire, were forced to sell their children to pay their debts, which Byzantine laws unsuccessfully tried to prevent. After the 10th century the major source of slaves were often Slavs and Bulgars, which resulted from campaigns in the Balkans and lands north of the Black Sea. At the eastern shore of the Adriatic many Slav slaves were exported to other parts of Europe (via the Balkan slave trade). Slaves were one of the main articles that Russian (often Varangian) traders dealt in their yearly visit to Constantinople via the Black Sea slave trade. The old Greek word "δοῦλος" (doulos) obtained a synonym in "σκλάβος" (sklavos), perhaps derived from the same root as "Slav".

==== Magyars of Hungary ====
The slave trade from the Balkans was mainly directed toward the Balkan slave trade of the Adriatic Sea rather than the Black Sea. However, in the 9th century, the Magyars of Hungary conducted regular slave raids toward the Slavs and sold their captives to the Byzantine slave traders in the Black Sea port of Kerch in exchange for brocades, wool, and other products.

Ahmad ibn Rustah, a 10th-century Persian traveler, remembers it this way:

The Magyar country (Etelköz) is rich in wood and water. The land is well watered and harvests abundant. They lord over all the Slavs who neighbour them and impose a heavy tribute on them. These Slavs are completely at their mercy, like prisoners. The Magyars are Pagans, worshipping fire. They make piratical raids on the Slavs and follow the coast [of the Black Sea] with their captives to a port in Byzantine territory named Karkh.

==== Viking slave trade ====
During the Early Middle Ages until the 11th century, the Black Sea was one of the two slave trade destinations of the Viking Volga trade route, which exported captured people to slavery in the Abbasid Caliphate in the Middle East via the Caspian Sea, the Samanid slave trade and Iran; and to the Byzantine Empire and the Mediterranean via Dnieper and the Black Sea.

The so-called saqaliba, which was the term for white slaves in the Islamic Middle East (often provided by the Vikings), is not likely to stand for exclusively Slavic ethnicity in practice, since many victims of the Vikings' saqaliba slave trade was in fact other ethnicities such as Baltics, Lithuanians, and Finno-Ugric people.

The Vikings trafficked European slaves captured in Viking raids in Europe in the East in two destinations from present day Russia via the Volga trade route; one to Slavery in the Abbasid Caliphate in the Middle East via the Caspian Sea, the Samanid slave trade and Iran; and one to the Byzantine Empire and the Mediterranean via Dnieper and the Black Sea slave trade.

People taken captive during the Viking raids in Europe could be brought to Scandinavia or sold to Moorish Spain via the Dublin slave trade. Captives from Viking raids across Europe could be transported to Hedeby or Brännö and from there via the Volga trade route to Russia, where slaves and furs were sold to Muslim merchants in exchange for Arab silver dirham and silk, which have been found in Birka, Wolin, and Dublin; initially this trade route between Europe and the Abbasid Caliphate passed via the Khazar Kaghanate, but from the early 10th century onward it went via Volga Bulgaria and from there by caravan to Khwarazm, to the Samanid slave market in Central Asia and finally via Iran to the Abbasid Caliphate.

Archbishop Rimbert of Bremen (d. 888) reported that he witnessed a "large throng of captured Christians being hauled away" in the Viking port of Hedeby in Denmark, one of whom was a woman who sang psalms to identify herself as a Christian nun, and who the bishop was able to free by exchanging his horse for her freedom.

Until the 9th century, the Vikings trafficked Baltic and Finnic European slaves from the Baltic Sea in the Northeastern Europe via the Wisla or the Donau rivers South East through Europe to the Black Sea. In the 9th century, the Viking slave route was redirected, and until the 11th century the Vikings trafficked slaves from the Baltic Sea via Ladoga, Novgorod and the Msta river to the Black Sea (and the Byzantine Empire), or to the Caspian Sea (and the Middle East) via the Volga trade route.

The Viking slave trade stopped in the 11th century, when Denmark, Norway, and Sweden became Christian themselves and thus could no longer trade in Christian slaves. The establishment of Kievan Rus likely also decreased the number of slaves taken in raids and limited it to the local market for slaves in Sweden, according to Lena Björkman.

==== Baltics, Sweden, and Finland ====
Since both Christians and Muslims banned the enslavement of people of their own faith but viewed pagans as legitimate targets for slavery, the pagans of northeastern Europe became highly targeted by the slave traders when the rest of Europe had become Christian by the 12th century. The pagan Lithuanians, Latvians, Estonians, Livonians, and Latgallians raided each other, Ingria and Novgorod during the 12th- and 13th-centuries, and sold war captives south to the Black Sea slave trade.

The Kievan Rus' slave trade was one of the biggest suppliers of slaves to the Byzantine Empire after its foundation in the 9th century. The Christian Rus's people also raided the pagan Estonians to sell them in the slave trade, since they were viewed as a legitimate target because they were pagans.

When the Norse Vikings became Christian and ended their piracy in the 11th century, they were succeeded by pagan pirates from the Baltics, who raided the coasts of the Baltic Sea, such as now Christian Sweden and Finland, for slaves. The island of Saaremaa was a base for the Baltic pirates, who were noted for selling women captives to the slave trade. In 1226, the pagan Baltic pirates from Saaremaa conducted a slave raid toward now Christian Sweden, where they captured many Swedish women and girls with the purpose to sell as slaves.

When the Viking slave trade stopped in the mid-11th century, the old slave trade route between the Baltic Sea and the Black Sea and Central Asia via the Russian rivers was upheld by Pagan Baltic slave traders, who sold slaves via Daugava to the Black Sea and East, which was now the only remaining slave trade in Europe after the slave market in Western Europe had died out in the 12th century.

==== Kievan Rus' slave trade ====
When the Kievan Rus' started to disintegrate in internal warfare between the smaller Russian states in the 12th century, the various Russian princes and their Cuman (Kipchak) allies captured the subjects of enemy Russian princes during their wars, which were sold to the slave traders.

The Bulgar Khan regularly conducted slave raids toward the Russian principalities and captured Russian "infidels" whom they sold to the Islamic Middle East via the Black Sea slave trade in exchange for weapons.

== Slave market ==
Slavery in the Byzantine Empire was still practiced during the Middle Ages. Emperor Basil I owned 3,000 slaves, and when Emperor Manuel I manumitted all the slaves in the capital of Constantinople in the 12th century, Eustathius of Thessalonica noted that most of the slaves came from "beyond the Danube" by origin and have arrived via the "northern winds" from Pontic lands, likely a euphemism from slaves exported to Byzantine by the Vikings via the Black Sea slave trade.

=== Social life ===
Slavery was mostly an urban phenomenon with most of the slaves working in households. The "Farmers Law" of the 7th/8th centuries and the 10th century "Book of the Prefect" deals with slavery. Slaves were not allowed to marry until it was legalized by Emperor Alexios I Komnenos in 1095. However they did not gain freedom if they did. The children of slaves remained slaves even if the father was their master. Many of the slaves became drafted in the army.

The socio-economic status of slaves did not necessarily coincide with their legal status. Slaves of the rich had a higher standard of living than free persons who were poor. Also, the legal system made it advantageous for masters to place them in certain economic positions, such as foremen of shops. For example, a goldsmith accused for illicit trade of gold, if he was a slave, could be confiscated. If he was free, he would be whipped and pay a heavy penalty exceeding the value of a slave. Thus, masters were appointing slaves as shop foremen, where they could have authority over free laborers (misthioi, μίσθιοι).

=== Eunuchs ===
Castration was outlawed, but the law was poorly enforced, and boys were often castrated before or after puberty. Eunuchs (castrated boys and men) were traded as slaves, both imported to and exported from the empire. The scholar Kathryn Ringrose says they "represented a distinct gender category, one that was defined by dress, assumed sexual behavior, work, physical appearance, quality of voice, and for some eunuchs, personal affect."

Eunuch servants were popular at times. Rich Byzantine families often paid high prices for these slaves, who they sometimes accepted as part of the household. Eunuchs played an important role in the Byzantine palace and court where they could rise to high posts.

=== Prices ===
Slave markets were present in many Byzantine cities and towns. The slave market of Constantinople was found in the valley of the Lamentations. At certain times a 10-year-old child's price was 10 nomismata, a castrated one of the same age was worth 30. An adult male 20 and an adult eunuch 50 nomismata.

== Transition from slavery to serfdom ==
It is probable that ordinary labour in towns was conducted on a system like that introduced by Diocletian, whereby the labourer was bound to pursue a hereditary calling, but received wages and provided his own keep. This is the system indicated in the tenth-century "Book of the Prefect". The "Farmer's Law" of the seventh and eighth centuries shows the free "colonus" working in his village, and the slave working on the large landed proprietor's estate, but both classes tended to fall into the condition of serfs tied to the soil. Thus the Byzantine Empire marks an important transitional period from slavery to free labour.

Slavery was morally condemned in the rhetoric of the Byzantine Orthodox church as a product of the greed of man, but the slavery was never outright outlawed, so it remained technically legal. However, slavery gradually diminished and transitioned in to serfdom; reaching its maximum in the 10th-century, slavery had become a minor urban phenomenon by the 13th century.

Emperor Justinian I (r. 527–565) undertook a major revision and codification of ancient Roman law, including law on slavery. He acknowledged that slavery was an unnatural state of human existence and not a feature of natural law. The Justinian law retained the principle that a slave was an item of property, but it did not state that a slave was devoid of personality. He removed some earlier harsh slave laws. For example, he gave to the slaves the right to plead directly and personally for their freedom, and he declared that the master killing his slave commits a murder. Additionally, Justinian legislated that freed slaves were to be given Roman citizenship.

Initially, a major use for slave labor was on large agricultural estates, where the landowners could own thousands of slaves; but this form of slavery was gradually replaced by serfdom, contributing to Byzantine slavery's relegation to a minor urban phenomenom.

Many slaves were supplied as non-Christian war captives, and slavery in the Byzantine Empire reached its maximum during the Balkan war campaigns of the 10th century. When Byzantine warfare against the Pagan Balkans ended after the 10th century, slavery gradually diminished in the following centuries. A small number of slaves for urban domestic slavery was, however, still imported in the 13th century.

== Famous slaves ==
- Samonas (eunuch)
- Andrew of Constantinople (holy man)
- Tzachas (soldier)
- John Axouch (soldier)

== See also ==
- History of slavery
- Slavery in ancient Rome
- Arab–Byzantine prisoner exchanges
- Slavery in the Ottoman Empire
