= Slavery in the Mamluk Sultanate =

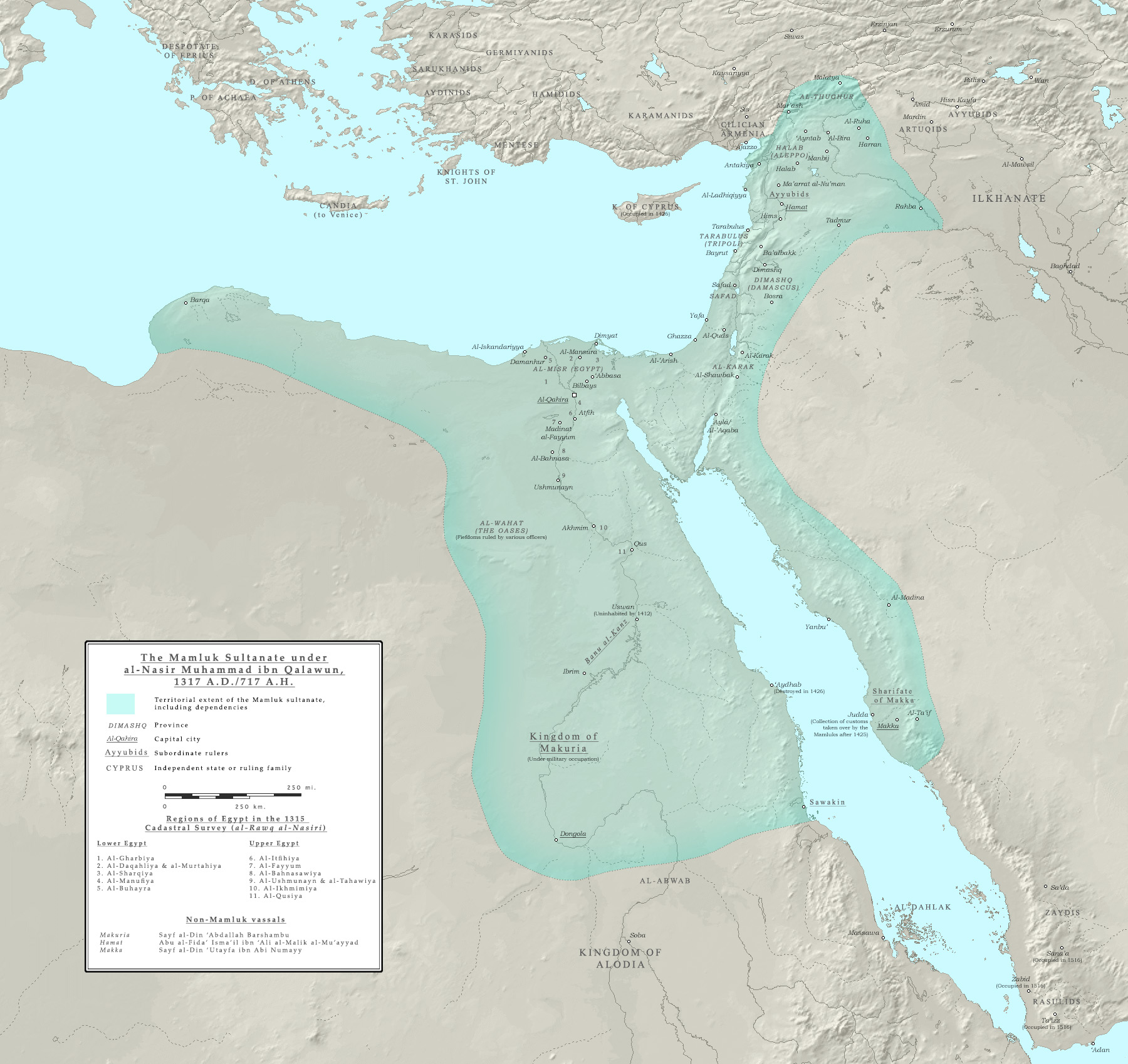
Mamluk Sultanate of Cairo 1317 AD

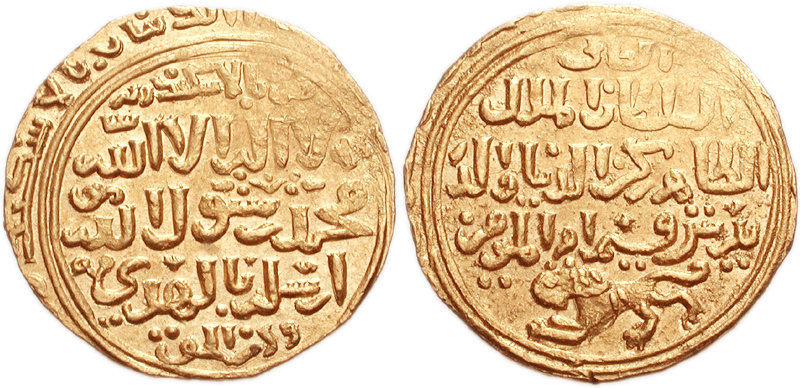
Dinar of Baybars

Slavery in the Mamluk Sultanate refers to the institution of chattel slavery in the Mamluk Sultanate (1250–1517) in Egypt and the Levant. The Mamluk Sultanate was the fourth of the five Islamic Caliphates that included most the Middle East, and the institution of slavery in the Mamluk Caliphate built upon the institution of slavery in the Abbasid Caliphate (750–1258), and was succeeded by the slavery in the Ottoman Empire (1517–1922), until slavery was ended in the 20th century.

During the Mamluk Sultanate era (1250–1517), society in Egypt was founded upon a system of military slavery. Male slaves trafficked for use as military slaves, mamluk, were a dominating social class in Egypt. The Mamluk slaves were initially often Turks from Central Asia, but from about 1400 their origin shifted to Circassian and European. Female slaves were used for sexual slavery and domestic maid service.

Slaves were imported from several directions. Turkic and Circassian slaves from Central Asia and the Black Sea were imported for military use and concubinage. African slaves were imported for labor from the South; and Europeans were imported from the North. Greek slaves were supplied from the religious border zone in Anatolia.

== Slave trade ==
=== African slaves ===
The Trans-Saharan slave trade continued during the Mamluk Sultanate. Egypt was provided with Black African slaves via their centuries-old Baqt treaty until the 14th century. It was during the Mamluk Sultanate that the slaves supplied via the Baqt treaty ended. Relations were worse under the Ayyubids and very poor under the Mamluks, with full-scale war eventually breaking out. Even after Makuria collapsed in the thirteenth century, the Egyptians continued to insist upon its payment by the Muslim successor kingdoms in the region. The Baqt finally ended in the mid-fourteenth century, with the complete collapse of organized government in the region.

=== European slaves ===
Greek slaves were provided by Genoese and Muslim Turks in Anatolia, which in this time period was a religious border zone between the Muslim world (Dar al-islam and the Dar al-harb) and thus according to Islamic regulations a legitimate slave supply source. Greek slaves were often sold as luxury slaves and sold for household and sophisticated tasks. Sultan al-Malik al-Nasir (r. 1299–1340), expanded the import of Greek slaves from Rum (Anatolia) and Turkish slaves Central Asia. Two main routes from Europe provided Egypt with European slaves. The Balkan slave trade and the Black Sea slave trade, managed via the Venetian slave traders and the Genoese slave traders, provided Egypt with many of the male slaves used as mamluk slave soldiers.

=== Mamluk slave trade ===
Until the late 14th-century, future (Turkish) Mamluks were regularly imported from Central Asia. However this changed in around 1400. The Balkan slave trade was, alongside the Black Sea slave trade, one of the two main slave supply sources of future Mamluk soldiers to the Mamluk Sultanate in Egypt. While the majority of the slaves trafficked via the Black Sea slave trade to South Europe (Italy and Spain) were girls, since they were intended to become ancillae maid servants, the majority of the slaves, around 2,000 annually, were trafficked to the Egyptian Mamluk Sultanate, and in that case most of them boys, since the Mamluk sultanate needed a constant supply of slave soldiers. From at least 1382 onward, the majority of the mamluks of the Egyptian Mamluk sultanate with slave origin came from the Black Sea slave trade; around a hundred Circassian males intended for mamluks were being trafficked via the Black Sea slave trade until the 19th century.

=== Indian slaves ===
During the 13th-century, Indian boys, women and girls intended for sexual slavery, were trafficked from India to Arabia and to Egypt across the Red Sea slave trade via Aden.

== Slave market ==
The slave market were famously dominated by its most significant and influential category, military slavery. Other categories were the common for slavery in Muslim lands, with women used as sex slaves (harem concubines) and domestic slave maids.

Slavery died out in Western Europe after the 12th century, but the demand for laborers after the Black Death resulted in a revival of slavery in Southern Europe in Italy and in Spain, as well as an increase in the demand for slaves in Egypt. The Italian (Genoese and Venetian) slave trade from the Black Sea had two main routes; from the Crimea to Byzantine Constantinople, and via Crete and the Balearic Islands to Italy and Spain; or to the Mamluk Sultanate in Egypt, which received the majority of the slaves.

In the late 14th century the normal price for an African slave-girl from Ethiopia was 300 dirham while the highest-valued slave-girls (normally a Greek) were sold for a price 550 dirham.

=== Female slaves ===
In parallel with the import of slave boys for the use of military slavery, slave girls were imported for usage as either concubines (sex slaves) or domestic servants, but the information about them are less documented. The customary sex segregation made it difficult for free Muslim women to work as domestic maidservants, and consequently, the Muslim world used slaves as domestic servants. While the documentation of female slaves are less than that of male Mamluk slaves during the Mamluk Sultanate, female slaves were in fact always more numerous than male slaves; especially in elite household, female slaves always outnumbered male, and slavery in the Mamluk Sultanate has therefore sometimes been referred to as a female phenomenon.

If a male enslaver chose to acknowledge the child he had with a female slave, which was voluntary, then the child would become free and the mother became umm walad, which meant that she could no longer be sold and would be free upon the death of her enslaver; however, as long as he was alive, she would remain a slave and could still be sexually exploited by him, rented out for work, or manumitted and married.

=== Harem slavery ===
The harem of the Mamluk sultans was housed in the Cairo Citadel al-Hawsh in the capital of Cairo (1250–1517).

==== Bahri harem ====
The Mamluk sultanate built upon the established model of the Abbasid harem, as did its predecessor the Fatimid harem. The mother of the sultan was the highest ranked woman of the harem. The consorts of the Sultans of the Bahri dynasty (1250–1382) were originally slave girls. The female slaves were supplied to the harem by the slave trade as children; they could be trained to perform as singers and dancers in the harem, and some were selected to serve as concubines (sex slaves) of the Sultan, who in some cases chose to marry them. Other slave girls served the consorts of the Sultan in a number of domestic tasks as harem servants, known as qahramana or qahramaniyya. The harem was guarded by enslaved eunuchs, until the 15th-century supplied by the Balkan slave trade and then from the Black Sea slave trade, served as the officials of the harem.

The harem of the Bahri Mamluk sultans were initially small and moderate, but Sultan Al-Nasir Muhammad (r. 1293–1341) expanded the harem to a major institution, which came to consummate as much luxury and slaves as the infamously luxurious harem of the preceding Fatimid dynasty. The harem of Sultan Al-Nasir Muhammad expanded to a larger size than any preceding Mamluk sultan, and he left a harem of 1,200 female slaves at his death, 505 of which were qiyan singing girls. He manumitted and married the slave Tughay (d. 1348), who left 1,000 slave girls and 80 eunuchs at her own death.

The harem played an influential part: the emir Arghun Al-alai, regent for sultan Al-Salih Ismail, married the sultan's mother to secure his power. Sultan As-Salih Salih (died 1354) gave his mother great influence: he arranged a royal banquet inside the royal harem, where he served her himself and organized a royal procession, a mawkib sultani, which was a ceremony otherwise customarily only given to sultans. Sultan Abu Bakr manumitted and married two of his slave girls, and the sultan al-Salih Ismail manumitted and married his slave concubine Ittifaq, who were later taken as wife by his brother and successor Al-Kamil Sha'ban, and finally by sultan al-Muzaffar.

==== Burji harem ====
During the Burji dynasty (1382–1517) the Mamluk Sultanate were no longer an inherited monarchy, and the Burji mamluk sultans were succeeded by their emirs. However, a certain dynastic continuity existed, in which the Sultans married the widow, concubine or female relative of his predecessor. The Burji Mamluk often married free Muslim women of the Mamluk nobility. However, the Burji harem, as its predecessor, maintained the custom of slave concubinage, with Circassian slave girls being popular as concubines, some of which became favorites and even wives of the Sultan. Sultan Qaitbay (r. 1468–1496) had a favorite Circassian slave concubine, Aṣalbāy, who became the mother of Sultan Al-Nasir Muhammad (r. 1496–1498) and later married Sultan Al-Ashraf Janbalat (r. 1500–1501). Her daughter-in-law, Miṣirbāy (d. 1522), a former Circassian slave concubine, married in succession Sultan Al-Nasir Muhammad (r. 1496–1498), sultan Abu Sa'id Qansuh (r. 1498–1500), and in 1517 the Ottoman Governor Khā’ir Bek.

=== Male slaves ===
The most famous category of male slaves to the Mamluk Sultanate were the mamluk slave soldiers. However, the mamluk soldiers were elite slaves. Not all male slaves were mamluk soldiers, and the conditions of non-Mamluk male slaves were very different.

African male slaves were not used as slave soldiers, since they were only considered suitable for lowly domestic tasks, and the Turkish and Circassian mamluk slave soldiers are known to have used African male slaves to attend to their horses and perform menial tasks for them, such as transporting and serving their food.

The condition of a male slave could change under certain conditions. If certain terms were met, a male slave could be allowed to make a manumission contract; in that case, he would be allowed to work and keep the money he earned on his labor, though he would still not be allowed to do things such as testify, or to marry without the permission of his owner.

=== Military slavery ===
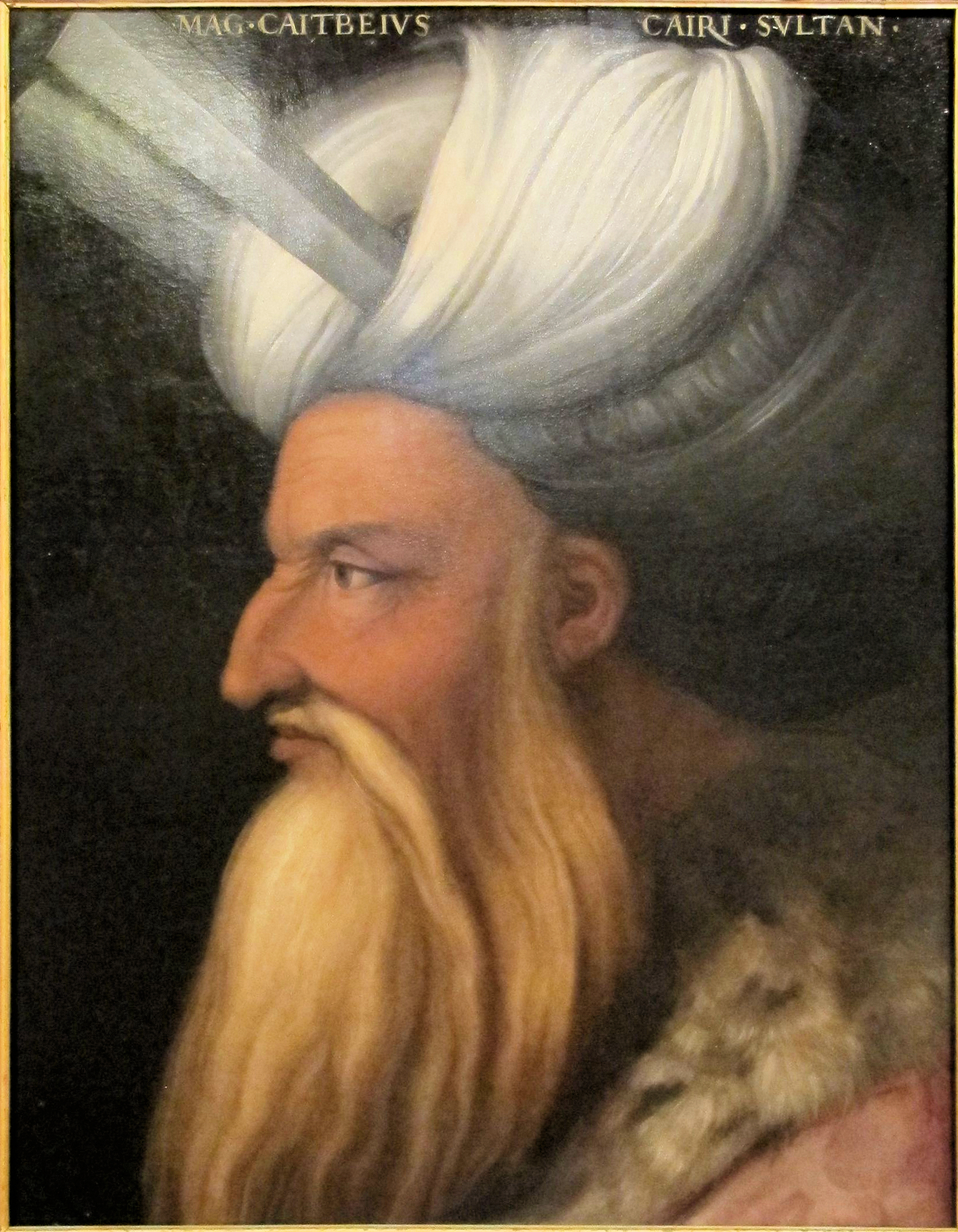
Mamluk Sultan Qaytbay, former slave.

From 935 to 1250, Egypt was controlled by dynastic rulers, notably the Ikhshidids, Fatimids, and Ayyubids. Throughout these dynasties, thousands of Mamluk servants and guards continued to be used and even took high offices. The Mamluks were essentially enslaved mercenaries. Originally the Mamluks were slaves of Turkic origin from the Eurasian Steppe, but the institution of military slavery spread to include Circassians, Abkhazians, Georgians, Armenians, and Russians, as well as peoples from the Balkans such as Albanians, Greeks, and South Slavs (see Saqaliba, Balkan slave trade and Black Sea slave trade).

The increasing level of influence among the Mamluk worried the Ayyubids in particular. Because Egyptian Mamluks were enslaved Christians, Islamic rulers did not believe they were true believers of Islam despite fighting for wars on behalf of Islam as slave soldiers.

In 1250, a Mamluk rose to become sultan. The Mamluk Sultanate survived in Egypt from 1250 until 1517, when Selim captured Cairo on 20 January. Although not in the same form as under the Sultanate, the Ottoman Empire retained the Mamluks as an Egyptian ruling class and the Mamluks and the Burji family succeeded in regaining much of their influence, but as vassals of the Ottomans.

The ruling Mamluks were not slaves, but former slaves. The Mamluks were sons of kafir (non-Muslim) parents from Dar al-harb (non-Muslim lands); they were bought as children, converted to Islam and brought up in military barracks where they were raised to become Muslim soldiers, during which they were raised, as slave children without families, to view the sultan as their father and the other mamluks as their brothers. Their education was finished by the kharj ceremony, during which they were manumitted and given a position in either the courtly administration or the army, and free to begin a career as a free ex-slave Mamluk. Mamluk slave soldiers were preferred to freeborn soldiers because they were raised to view the army and their sultan-ruler as their family and thus seen as more loyal than a freeborn soldier who would have a biological family to whom thei would have their first loyalty.

In the late 14th century, the ethnicity of the Mamluks shifted from Turkish to Circassian; when the Golden Horde considered the Islamization of Turkish Central Asia to be complete enough, Jani Beg banned the import of Turkish slaves to Egypt since they were no longer defined as kafir and thereby by Islamic law no longer legitimate for Muslims to enslave. After around 1400 therefore, Mamluk were normally of Circassian origin rather than Turkish, the Circassian being Pagan and Christian and thus as kafirs legitimate for enslavement.

== Racial dimension of slavery ==
According to slavery in Islamic law, non-Muslim people from non-Muslim lands were legitimate to enslave by Muslims. There was thus no particular ethnicity targeted for slavery, but rather slaves of many different ethnicities. However, this did not exclude racism. Slaves were regarded to have different abilities depending on their ethnicity, and were seen as suitable for different tasks because of these stereotypes, which were described in various manuals and handbooks for slave traders and slave buyers of the time.

Skin color was ascribed certain abilities and classified in a system in which different races were attributed different traits depending on the color of their skin. In the Arab world, a mid skin tone was often preferred, since it was closer to the Arab skin color, while both darker and lighter skin colors were perceived as something negative. Slaves with a very light-skinned skin color were seen as vicious, evil, disloyal and untruthful; slaves of reddish-white skin color were praised as clever, intelligent, knowledgeable and with a trait for reason and wisdom. Those with brownish skin color were seen as brave, determined and fearless; however, people with full Black African skin color were seen as fearful, cowardly, ill-disposed, rash and more inclined to evil than good.

The author al-Amshati described the racial stereotypes of slaves depending on race extensively in his work. The most appreciated slave races in the market were Turkic people and Circassians, who were the two preferred races acquired for use as Mamluk soldiers. al-Amshati described Turks as a race of moderate temperament, sturdy in body, with a beautiful well-proportioned physique and gloomy of mien, and Turkish children as clean, healthy, clever, skillful and pretty; Turks from Khurasan were considered the best on the market. The next best race were the Circassians, who were stereotyped as braver than the Turks, "always ready strike first blow" and with excellent group solidarity, suitable for soldiers. However, they were haughty if untrained, lacked work ethic and the patience and perseverance necessary for long military campaigns, and required hard training. If given rigorous training, however, they could become both excellent soldiers as well as religious scholars.

Black Africans were seen as excellent slaves, suitable for lowly domestic labor. al-Amshati described "Abyssinians" (Africans) as physically weak slaves who often fall ill; however, they had a long number of traits suitable for slavery such as being of strong character, righteous, patient, obedient, intelligent, shrewd and prudent, and African women were thought to be particularly docile. However, Black children were described as sly, deceitful, malicious and thieving of character. African slaves were not considered suitable for arts such as singing and dancing, and were not used for Mamluk elite slavery, but mainly for lowly labor and domestic tasks. By the 14th century, a significant number of slaves came from sub-Saharan Africa, and racist attitudes occurred, exemplified by the Egyptian historian Al-Abshibi (1388–1446) writing that "[i]t is said that when the [black] slave is sated, he fornicates, when he is hungry, he steals."

Greek (rumi) male slaves were seen as obedient, serious, loyal, trustworthy, intelligent and parsimonious, with good manners and excellent knowledge of the sciences. Greek female slaves were characterized as impertinent, but still suited for household tasks.

The least popular slave races were Armenians and Europeans. They were not considered to be loyal and obedient slaves, but rather unwilling and defiant, and possessed of a number of traits making them hard to control for usage as slaves. Armenian slaves were described as strong and of good health and looks, but also as dishonest, lazy, greedy, unreliable, morose and of a character to neglect personal hygiene. They were said to be good for nothing but hard physical labor, and required frequent chastisement and punishment to obey. Light-skinned Franks (a term for Europeans) were, in the case of men, described as rough, courageous, miserly, stupid and uneducated, strongly religious, skilled in a number of manual tasks but not trustworthy slaves. Female Frankish (European) slaves were referred to as coarse, cruel and merciless if kept as slaves. Frankish (European) children, however, were popular and described as excellent slaves; courageous, slender and rosy-cheeked.

== See also ==
- Slavery in Egypt
- That Most Precious Merchandise: The Mediterranean Trade in Black Sea Slaves, 1260-1500
- Human trafficking in Egypt
