= Roman jewelry =

Ancient Roman adornment

Ancient Roman jewelry was characterized by its use of colored gemstones and glass, in contrast to earlier Greek jewelry, which was noted for its high-quality metalwork by practiced artisans. Roman jewelry making thrived thanks to the abundance of natural resources sourced through widespread control of Mediterranean territories. Further commerce opened access to precious and semi-precious stones imported from the East via the Persian Silk Road. Throughout the Roman world, jewelry was worn by both men and women and by every social class, serving as decoration and as a marker of wealth and social status. Jewelry styles and materials in the Roman Empire were shaped by Greek, Egyptian, and Etruscan influences throughout its history.

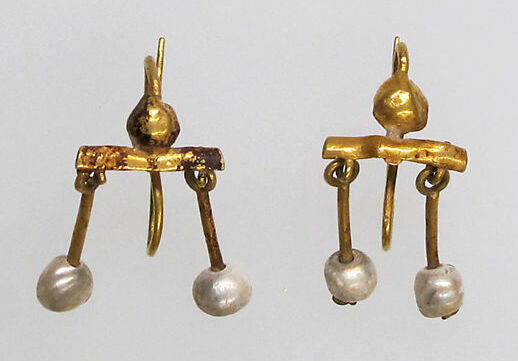
A pair of crotalia earrings from the Roman Empire

== Materials and style ==
Although fine gold and silver jewelry receives much attention, such pieces were typically reserved for the wealthy, while most Roman jewelry worn by the lower classes was made of bronze or other inexpensive metals. Unlike earlier Greek jewelry, much Roman jewelry would have been mass-produced using molds and casting methods, a shift which made such items affordable to a broader public.

Roman jewelry worn by the higher classes was produced in many forms, including solid gold necklaces, earrings, rings, bulla, and bracelets. The latter were sometimes made without clasps—such solid gold snake bracelets—while others were secured to the wrist using gold pins or small gold screws.

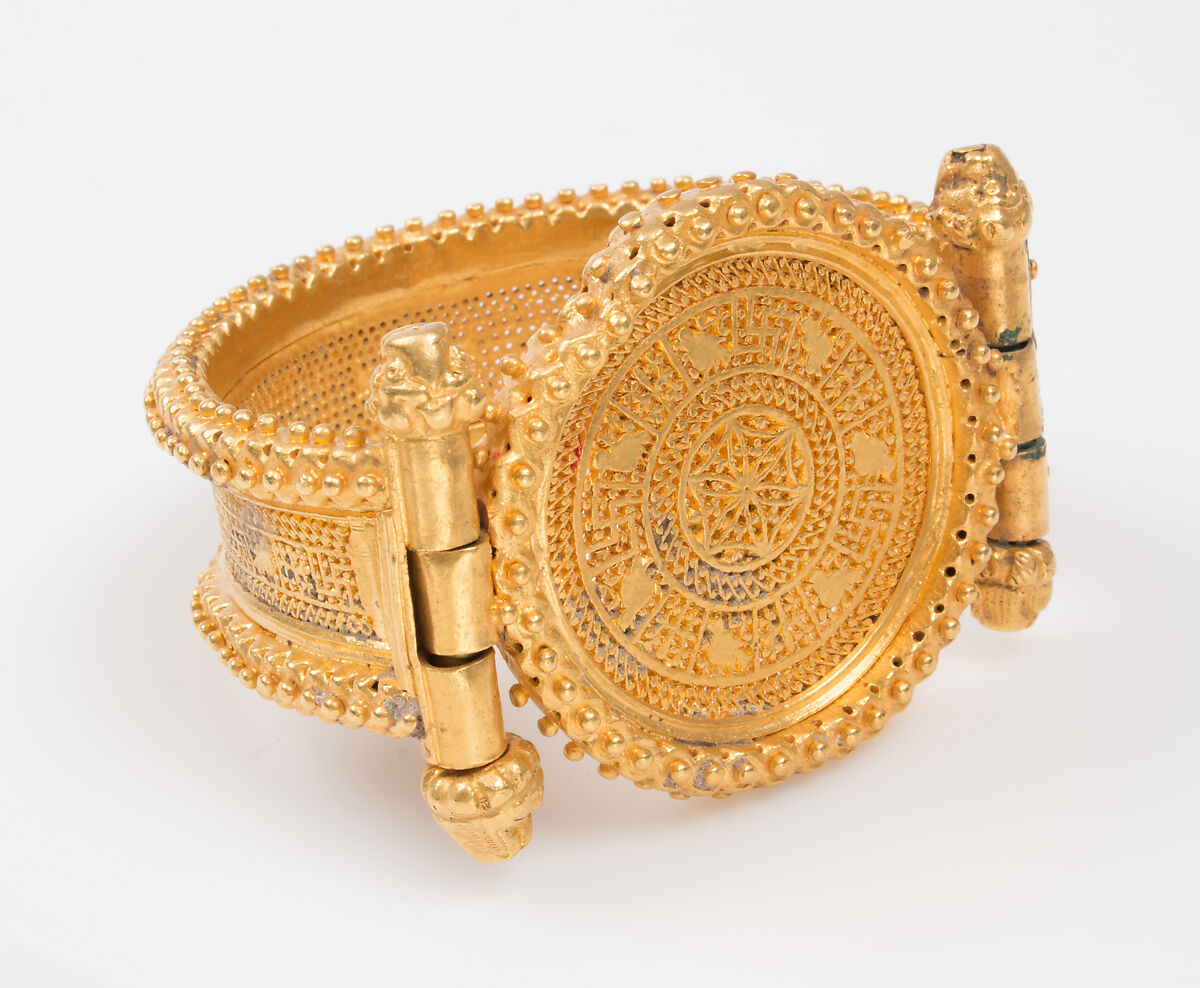
Roman solid gold medallion bracelet with gold screw fasteners c. 400 AD.

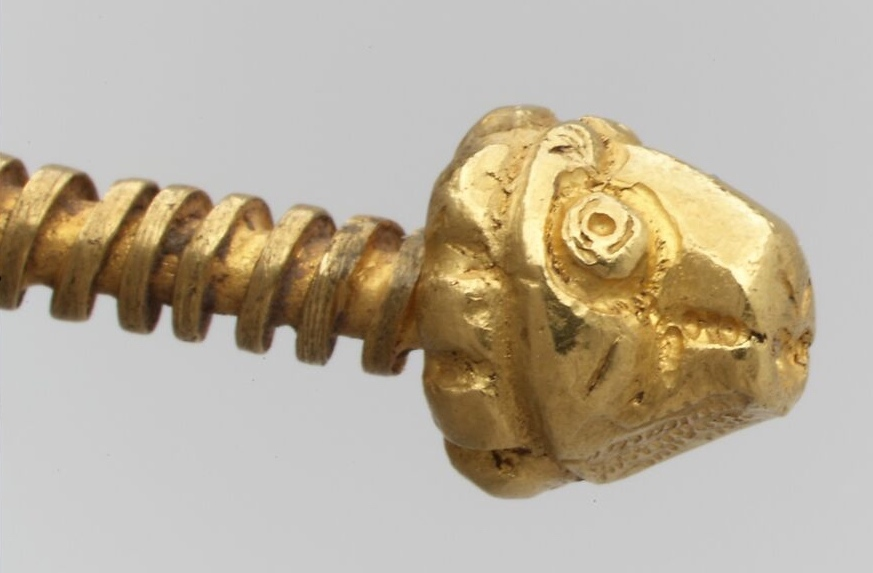
Roman lion's head gold screw fastener for solid gold medallion bracelet c. 400 AD.

Roman aesthetic values led to the increased use of precious and semi-precious gemstones as well as colored glass in jewelry. Semi-precious stones such as garnet, emeralds, jasper, and lapis were imported from Egypt while onyx, amber, and moonstone came to Rome from the Persian Gulf. Ostentatious and creative use of color was valued over fine metalwork. Glass makers were supposedly so skilled that they could fool the public into thinking that glass beads and ornaments were actually gemstones. Jewelry made entirely of glass, including rings and bracelets, was also widespread in Roman society, as its relatively low cost allowed less affluent Romans to follow imperial and aristocratic fashions. When genuine gems were used, the stones preferred by Roman women were amethyst, emerald, and pearl. Pearls were rare and expensive and were used in Roman jewelry up until the end of the Republic. Clusters of large pearl beads were used to make earrings called crotalia (rattles).

Cameos and intaglios were also important forms of Roman gemstone jewelry. Intaglios were engraved below the surface of the stone and were often used as seals, while cameos displayed raised relief images. Roman cameos could serve not only as adornments but also as expressions of wealth, âreligious devotion, or political allegiance.

== Social implications ==
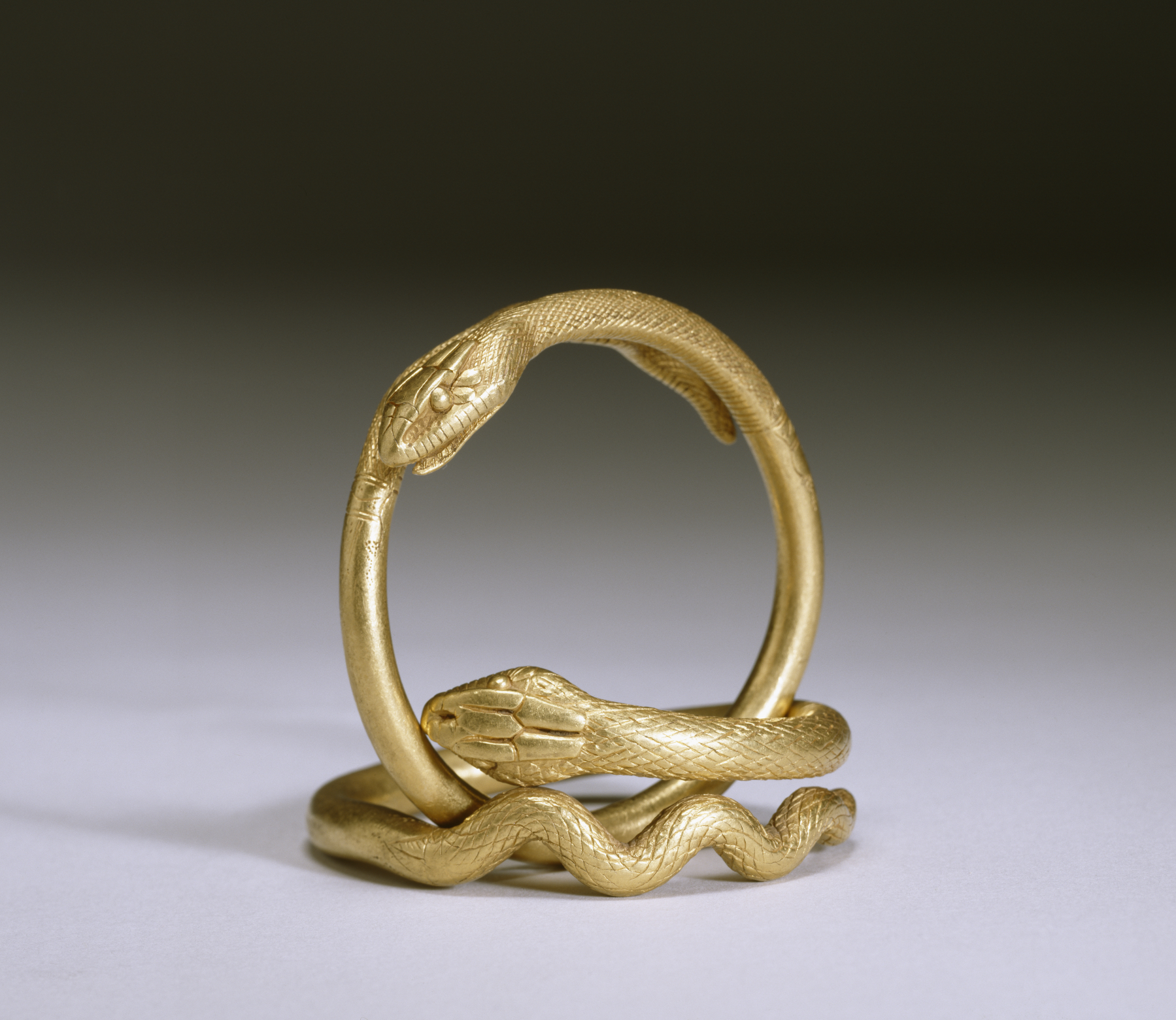
Solid gold snake bracelets, among the most popular types of Roman jewelry. Snake bracelets were often worn in pairs, around the wrists as well as on the upper arms

The focus on showiness and imitation of fine materials demonstrates the fact that Romans were highly conscious of how they presented themselves in public. While living, Roman men and women frequently used ornamentation of their houses and bodies to demonstrate wealth, power, influence, and knowledge.This representation changed over time, as noblewomen of the Republic's ornamentum symbolized familial status, while an Imperial noblewomen's ornamentation represented personal achievement and status. Elites such as bureaucrats and senators wore gold rings featuring large flashy gemstones to signal status while plebeians wore iron rings except in circumstances where a gold one has been awarded.

=== Gender ===
As in many societies, ancient Roman accessorizing varied with gender, age, and social standing. Women of high status were expected to wear extravagant gold jewelry in abundance in order display their wealth and rank.

==== Women ====
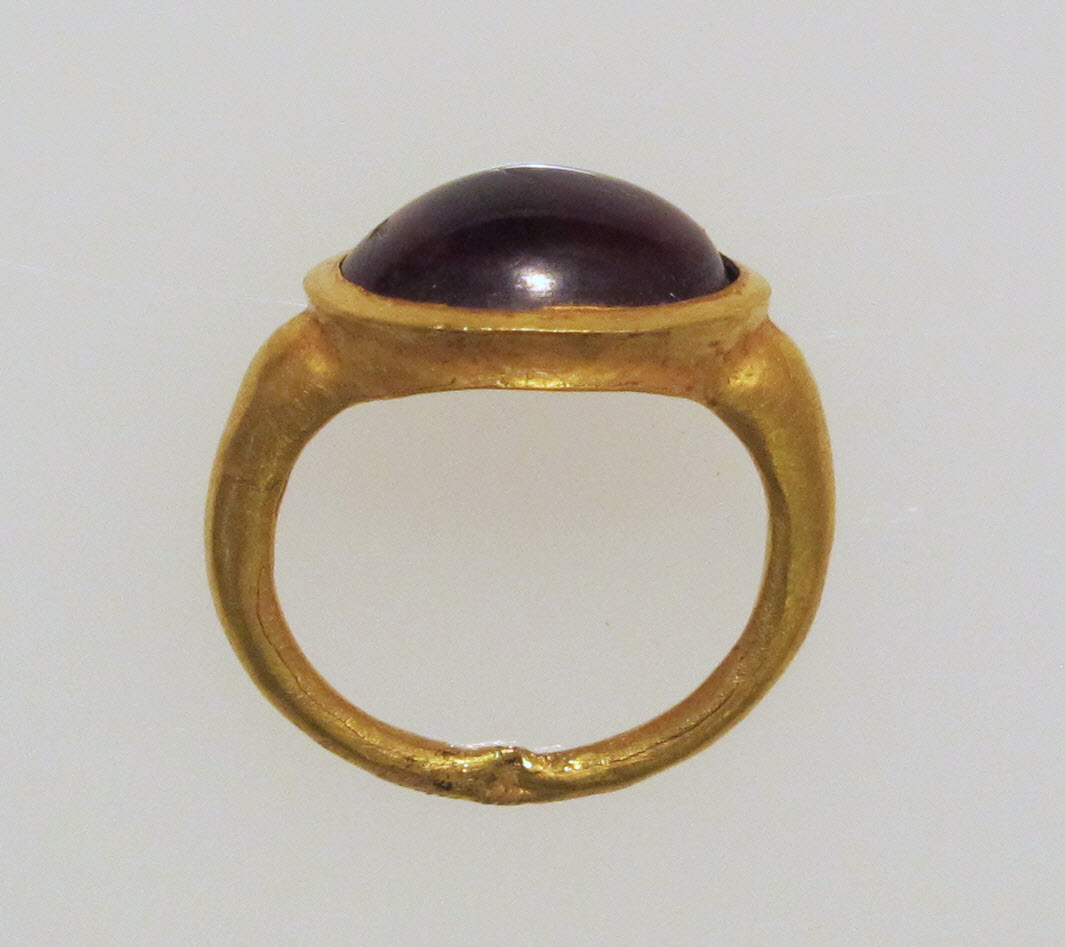
An Ancient Roman ring made from gold with a garnet stone

Roman women collected and wore more jewelry than men. Women usually had pierced ears, in which they would wear one set of earrings. Additionally, they would adorn themselves with necklaces, bracelets, rings, and fibulae. One choker-style necklace, two bracelets, and multiple rings would be worn at once. Jewelry was particularly important to women because it was considered to be their own property, which could be kept independently of their husband's wealth and used as the women saw fit. They had the right to buy, sell, bequeath, or barter their own jewelry. Women in Ancient Rome were valued on their elegance in dress and adornment with extravagant jewelry. The way an elite woman accessorized and presented herself in public reflected the rank of her husband.

==== Men ====
Roman men usually wore less jewelry than women, sometimes opting for pendants but mostly wearing fibulae and finger rings, with gold rings being reserved for those of senatorial rank. Unlike the Greeks, Roman men often wore several rings at once.

==== Children ====
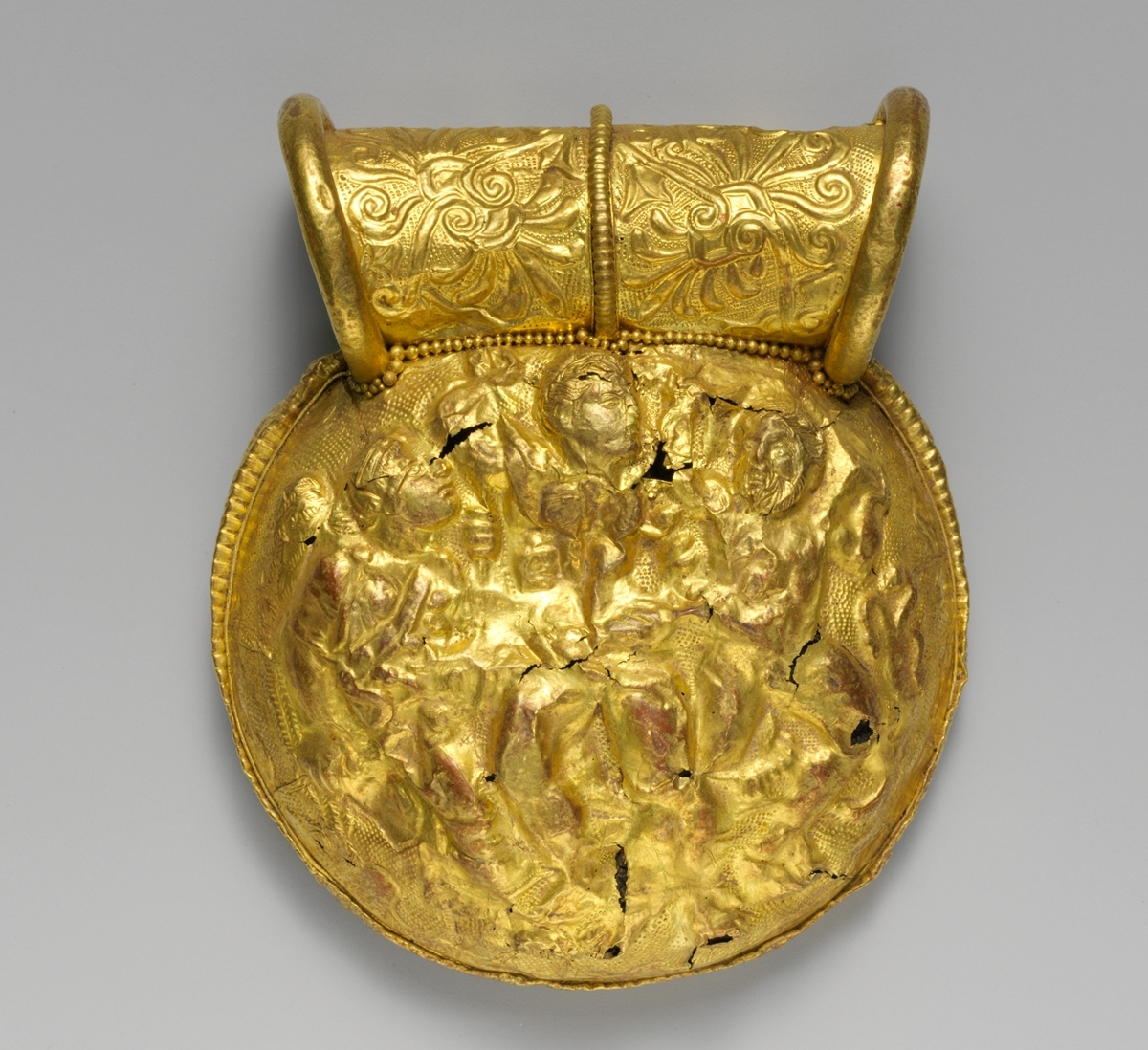
Etruscan golden bulla from the 3rd Century BC

Roman children's jewelry served a special purpose: it was meant to shield the wearer from illness and misfortune, particularly through amulets draped around the neck. Sometimes a phallic-shaped fascinus was placed on or near a young boy to ward off evil forces. Other kinds of amulets known as bullae—first created in Greece and later popularized in Rome during the 4th and 3rd centuries BC—were worn by young elite boys until adulthood.

=== Beyond accessories ===
Collections of jewelry represented great wealth and power to their Roman owners and often carried spiritual significance. Hoards of gold, silver, and bronze pieces have been found at Greek and Roman temples, suggesting that worshippers would have offered some of their jewelry to divinities, much as they would other objects. A similar Roman practice which arose after the sack of Greek cities Tarentum, Syracuse, and Capua, was that of using gold diadems or of wreaths made of delicate golden leaves and florals to dignify the funerary rites of both men and women.
