= Moregine bracelet =

Gold snake-shaped bracelet from Moregine, near Pompeii

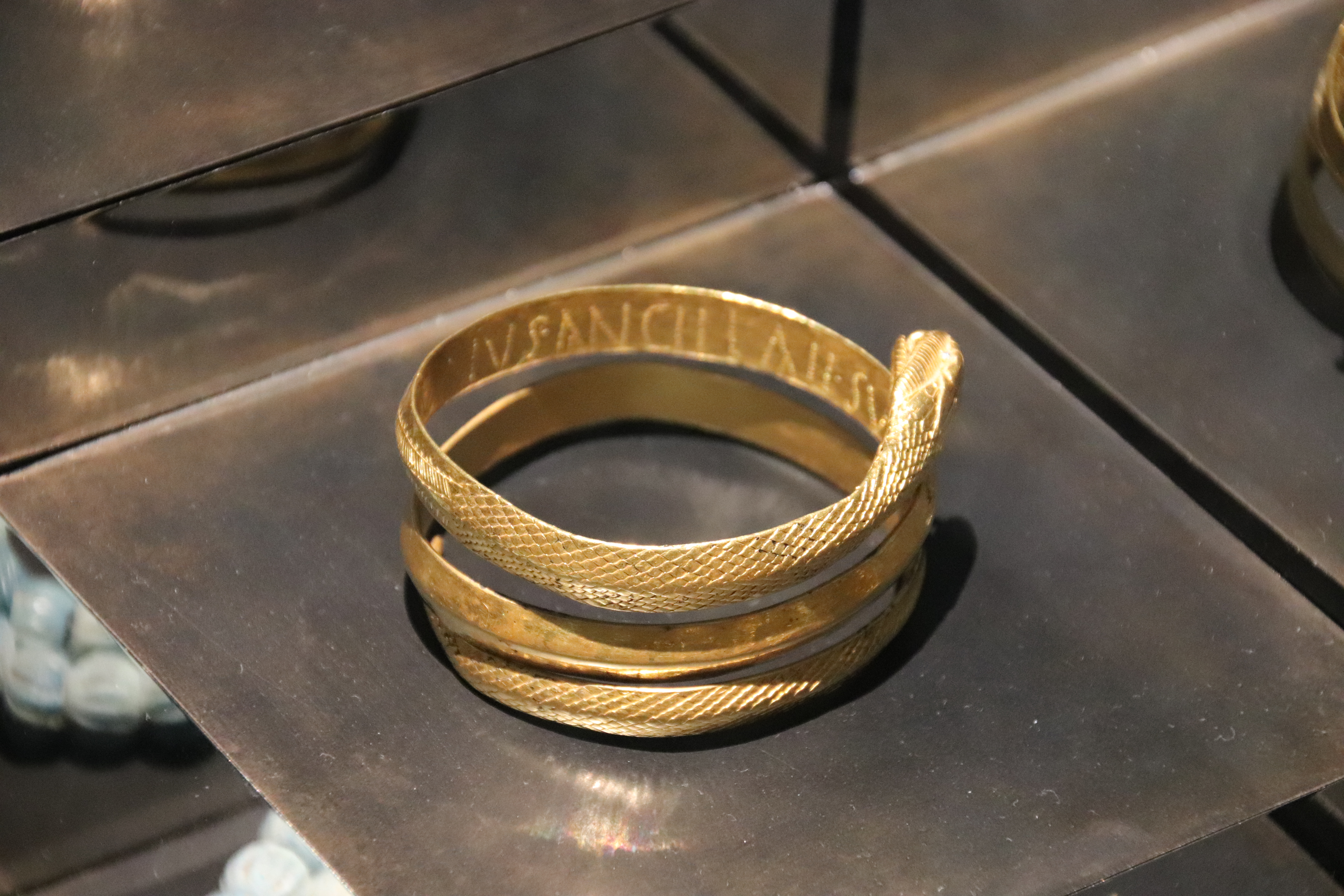
Gold Roman bracelet in the shape of a snake found at Moregine, near Pompeii. It is inscribed "dominus ancillae suae" on the inside.

In November 2000, an archaeological excavation at Moregine, (Note: Also sometimes called Murecine) to the south of Pompeii, discovered the body of a woman with several pieces of gold jewellery, including a gold bracelet in the shape of a snake. The bracelet, inscribed "dom(i)nus ancillae suae" ("the master to his slave girl"), has been interpreted variously as a gift to a domestic slave, a slave prostitute, or a free woman from her lover.

== Discovery ==
The Moregine bracelet was discovered in an excavation of November 2000. It was found in the remains of an inn, on the body of a woman aged about 30 at the time of her death. The bodies of another adult woman and three children were found alongside her. It is likely that they were fleeing Pompeii following the earthquakes which preceded the eruption of Vesuvius, and were killed at the beginning of the eruption.

The bracelet is the "best known and most debated" artifact found, but was one of twelve pieces of gold jewellery either worn by the woman or in a bag found with the body. (Note: Jennifer Baird describes the woman as wearing a hair clip and a ring on her left hand; Meredith Nelson says she was a second snake-shaped bracelet, a ring, and the remains of a necklace.) The bag also contained some gold coins. It is not certain whether all of these valuables were owned by the woman who was found carrying them or if she had looted them in her escape from Pompeii, though Jennifer Baird suggests that her wearing the snake bracelet indicates a possible personal connection.

== Description ==
The bracelet is gold, about eight centimeters in diameter and weighs around 500 grams. It is a flattened band which is designed to wrap three times around the wearer's arm. The bracelet has a head and tail carved to look like a snake, with glass-paste eyes and engraved scales.

=== Inscription ===
On the inside of the bracelet is an inscription, near the head of the snake, reading "dom(i)nus ancillae suae" ("the master to his very own slave girl"). The words are divided by interpuncts, and "II" is used in place of "E". It is not possible to determine when the bracelet was inscribed.

The bracelet's inscription, and its implications for the status of the woman wearing it, have been the subject of much academic discussion. Several possible interpretations of this inscription have been put forward, including that it was a gift to a domestic slave or a freedwoman from her master, or to a slave prostitute from a client; that it was worn by a slave prostitute as part of her role, and owned by her master; or that it was a gift between free lovers using slavery as a metaphor for love. Though the interpretation of the bracelet as a gift to a slave has often been seen as evidence of affection between masters and slaves, Jennifer Baird has criticised this view as downplaying the violence and exploitation of ancient slavery.

If the owner of the bracelet was a freedwoman, the bracelet may have been given on the occasion of her manumission; in this case the use of the word "ancilla" might allude to her continued dependency as a manumitted slave upon her former master. Alternatively, if she was a slave, it may have formed part of her peculium. The gift of such valuable jewellery to a slave may have been used to demonstrate the wealth of her master: Courtney Ward draws a parallel between the bracelet of the Moregine woman and Terence's play Heauton Timorumenos, where a character owns ten slave girls, all of whom are dressed in expensive clothes and jewellery.

== Works cited ==
- Baird, J. A. (2015). "On Reading the Material Culture of Ancient Sexual Labour". Helios. 42 (1): 163. Bibcode:2015Helio..42..163B. doi:10.1353/hel.2015.0001.
- Berg, Ria (2017). "Toiletries and Taverns: Cosmetic Sets in Small Houses, Hospitia and Lupanaria at Pompeii". Arctos: Acta Philologica Fennica. 51.
- Berg, Ria (2018). "Furnishing the courtesan's house: Material culture and elite prostitution in Pompeii". In Berg, Ria; Neudecker, Richard (eds.). The Roman Courtesan: Archaeological Reflections of a Literary Topos.
- Berg, Ria P. (2021). "The harbour of Venus? Sub-elite identities, multi-sensorial adornment, and Pompeian bars". Acta Ad Archaeologiam et Artium Historiam Pertinentia. 33.
- D'Ambrosio, Antonio (2001). "I monili dallo scavo di Moregine". Mélanges de l'École française de Rome. 113 (2): 967–980. doi:10.3406/mefr.2001.9667.
- Edmondson, Jonathan (2011). "Slavery and the Roman Family". In Bradley, Keith; Cartledge, Paul (eds.). The Cambridge World History of Slavery. Vol. 1: The Ancient Mediterranean World.
- Guzzo, Pier Giovanni; Scarano Ussani, Vincenzo (2001). "La schiava di Moregine". Mélanges de l'École française de Rome. 113 (2): 981–997. doi:10.3406/mefr.2001.9668.
- Nappo, Salvatore Ciro (2012). "L'edificio B di Murecine a Pompei Un esempio di architettura ricettiva alla foce del Sarno". Rivista di studi Pompeiana. 23.
- Nelson, Meredith P. (2021). "Chains of gold: female status and the Roman catena in the early Imperial period". Acta Ad Archaeologiam et Artium Historiam Pertinentia. 33.
- Ward, Courtney A. (2021). "Ornamenta Muliebria: Jewellery and Identity in the Roman Period". In Batten, Alicia J.; Olson, Kelly (eds.). Dress in Mediterranean Antiquity: Greeks, Romans, Jews, Christians. T&T Clark. ISBN 978-0-5676-8466-0.
