= Ancillae =

Female domestic slave

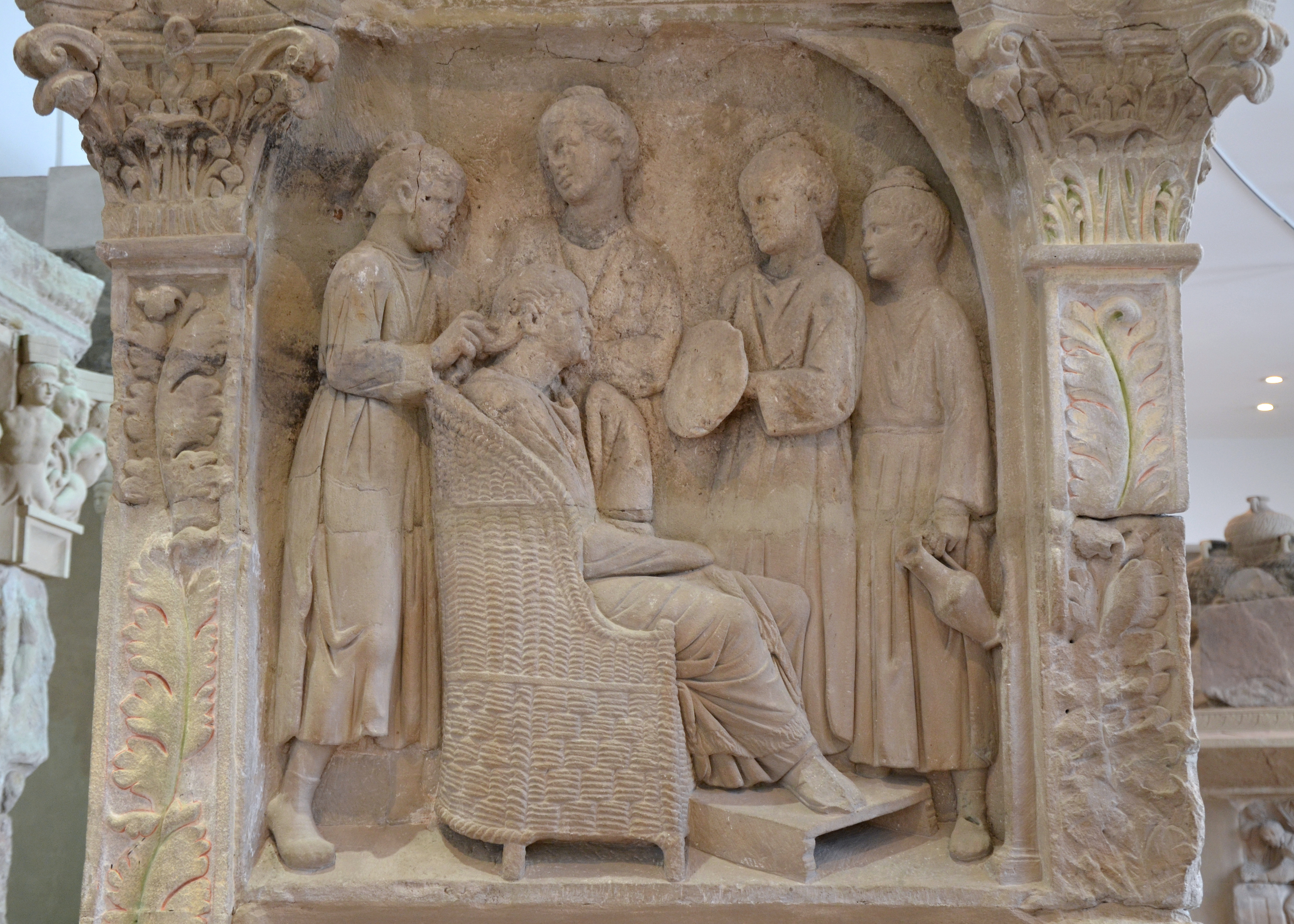
Four ancillae assisting their mistress, on a funerary relief from Roman Germany (ca. 220 AD)

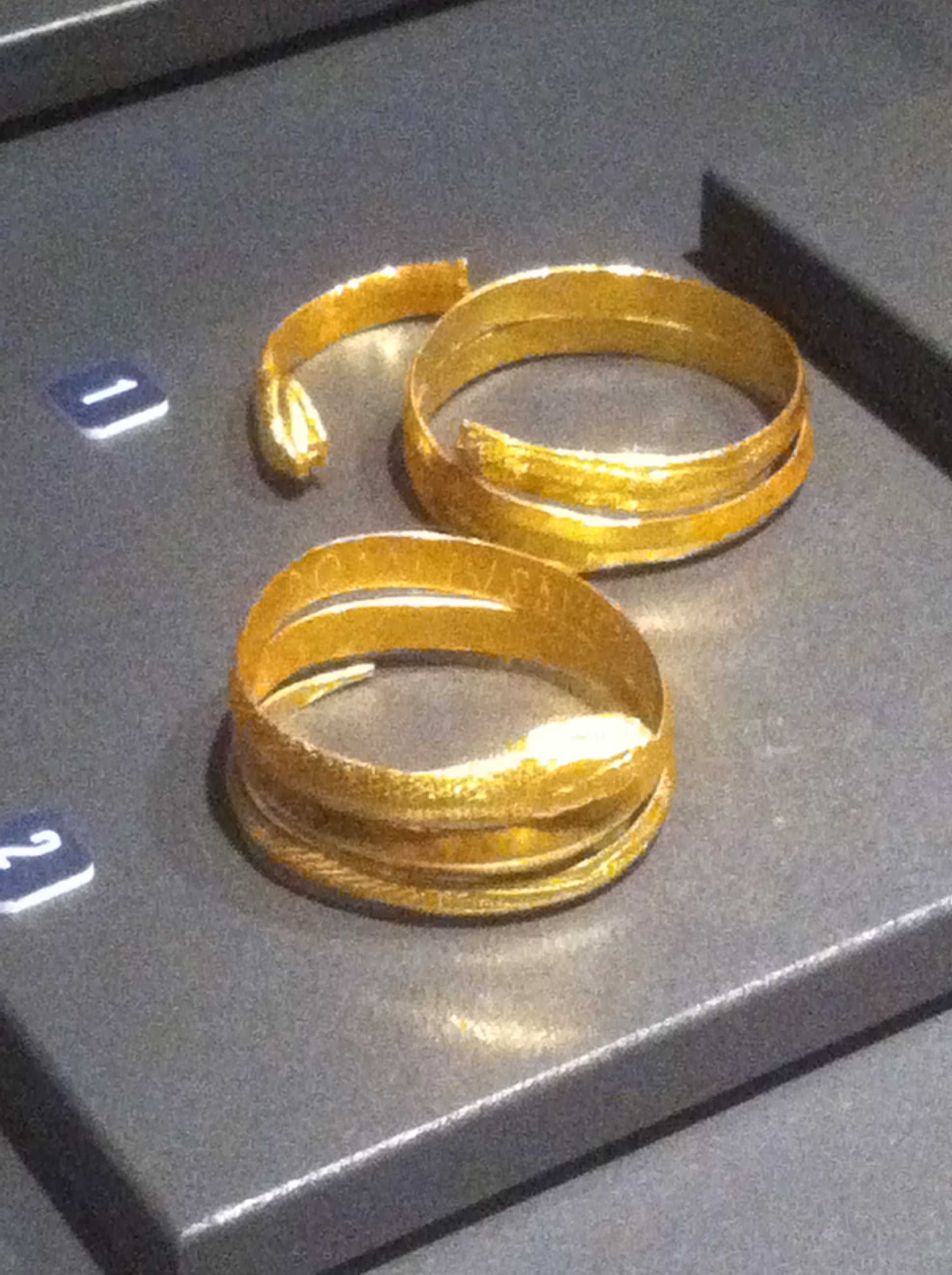
Gold armilla from Moregine, near Pompeii, with inscription Dominus ancillae suae, "The master to his slavegirl."

Ancillae (plural) (singular, ancilla) were female house slaves in ancient Rome, as well as in Europe during the Middle Ages.

In medieval Europe, slavery was gradually replaced by serfdom, but a small number of female slaves were imported as household servants for the wealthy, most commonly in Italy, Spain and France.

== Ancient Rome ==
Ancilla was the common word for a female slave in Ancient Rome. The more general word for a female slave was serva. An ancilla in an upper class household might serve like a lady's maid. Ancillae in this setting might be specialized in attending to the upkeep, storage, and readiness of the mistress's wardrobe or jewelry. For example, one inscription records an ancilla named Phoebe assigned ad speculum, "to the mirror".

The Roman law of slavery pertained to both male and female slaves, and was specific to ancillae primarily in regard to socially gendered issues arising from motherhood and marriage. Since the status of slaves was defined by the lack of legal personhood, ancillae could not enter into forms of marriage recognized in Roman law; however, ancillae like other household slaves might form a heterosexual union (contubernium) that expressed an intention to marry if both partners were manumitted and obtained citizen rights. A master who wanted to marry an ancilla could free her for this purpose. A man of senatorial rank could not legally marry a freed woman but might enter into monogamous concubinage (concubinatus) with her.

In general, children of ancillae were born into slavery as vernae.

== Medieval Europe ==
As the Roman Empire became Christianized, enslaving Christians was banned but still permitted for non-Christians. Similarly, it was banned to make Muslims slaves in the Muslim world, but permitted to take non-Muslims as slaves. This created a slave trade in which slaves from the Muslim world were sold to Christian Europe, and slaves from Europe were sold to the Muslim Middle East.

The biggest source of ancillae for Italy and Spain was the Balkan slave trade and the Black Sea slave trade. The merchants of this slave trade were often Venetian: the Balkan slave trade was a part of the Venetian slave trade, and the Black Sea slave trade was particularly Venetian, partially Genoese.

The slaves normally converted to the Christianity or Islam of their respective masters after they had been bought, but were still kept in slavery. While it was legal for an ancilla to marry, she as well as her children were still slaves. Because this status caused legal confusion between the legal guardianship of a husband towards his wife and children, marrying an ancilla was not encouraged, which created a need for continuing slave import to uphold the recruitment of new ancillae, since there were few born into slavery.

Most medieval ancillae came from the Greek Orthodox Balkans, and although they were Christians, they were not recognized as such by the Catholic Church; hence taking them as slaves was considered legal.

Among the ancillae slaves were Maddalena, mother of Carlo de' Medici (1428–1492), who is noted to have been a Circassian slave bought in 1427 in Venice.

The occurrence of enslaved ancillae disappeared in South Europe when the Balkan slave trade and the Black Sea slave trade to Europe stopped in the mid 15th-century.

== See also ==
- House slave
