= Balkan slave trade =

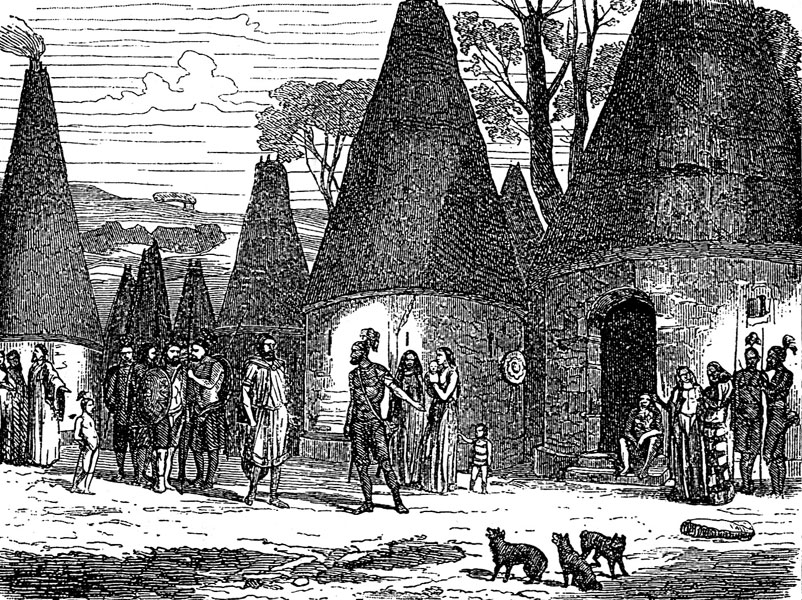
Illustration of Sclaveni between the Danube and the Balkan Mountains

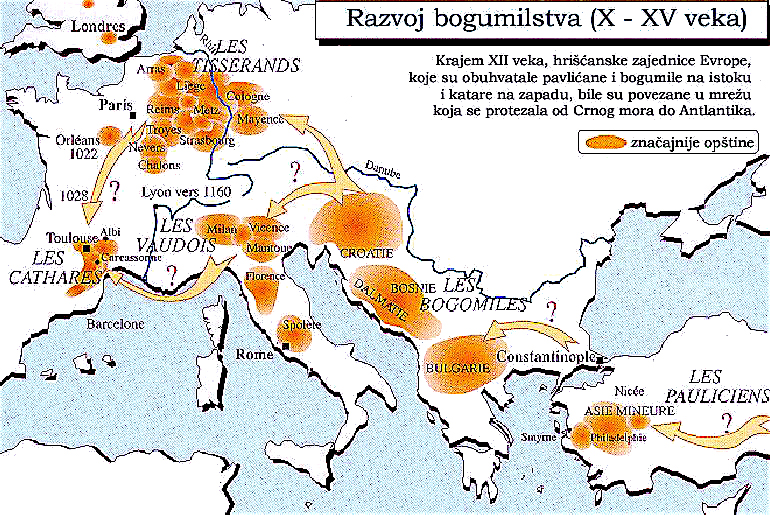
The spread of Bogomilism.

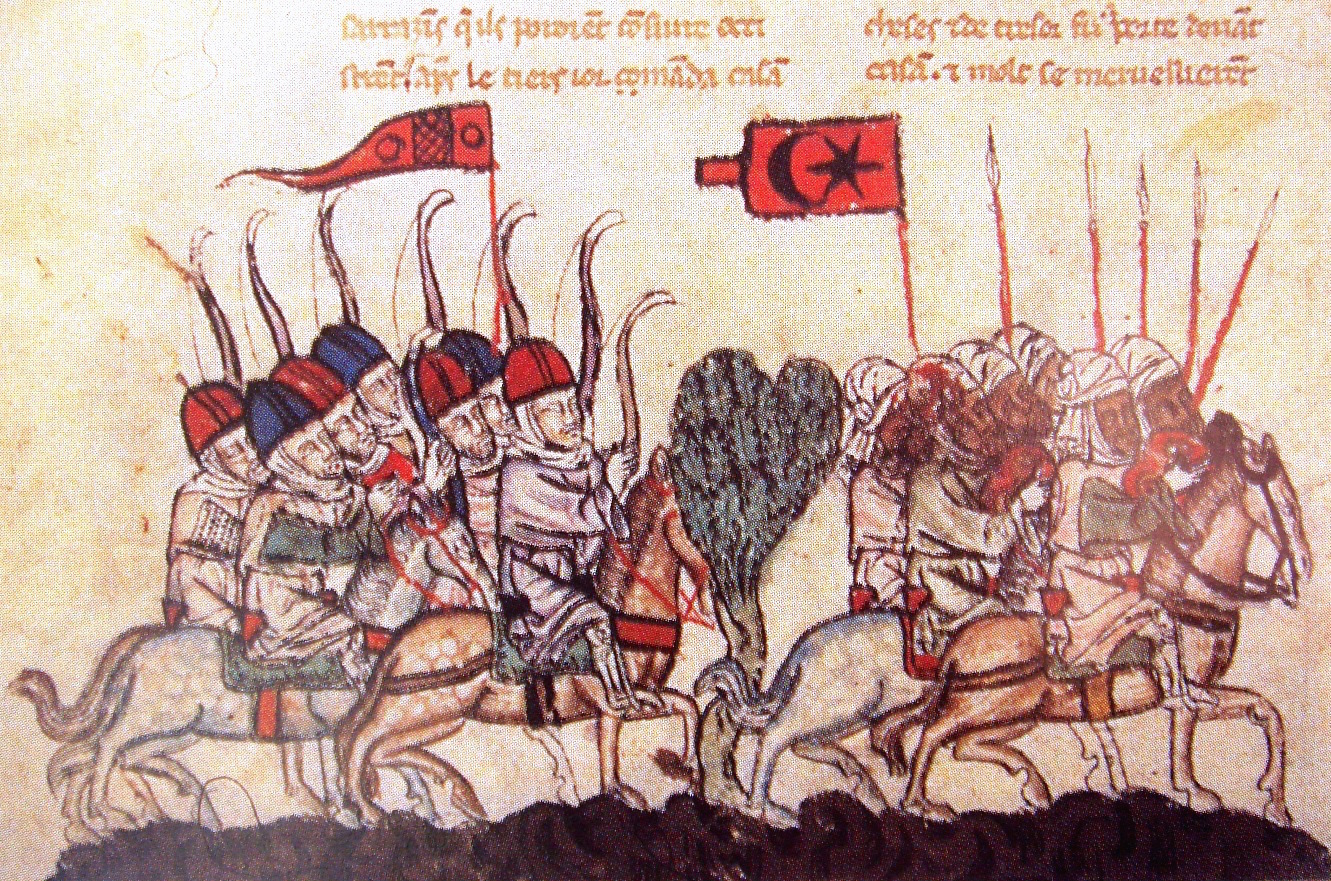
The battle of Wadi al-Khazandar in 1299, depicting Mongol archers and Mamluk cavalry. During that time many Mamluk soldiers originated from the Balkan and Black Sea slave trades.

The Balkan slave trade was the trade in slaves from the Balkans via Venetian slave traders across the Adriatic and Aegean Seas to Italy, Spain, and the Islamic Middle East, from the 7th century during the Early Middle Ages until the mid-15th century. It was one of the routes of the Venetian slave trade.

The trade rested on the fact that the Balkans was a religious border zone, which was significant in the Middle Ages, when religion was the determining factor on who was viewed as a legitimate target of enslavement. The Balkans was pagan territory long into the Middle Ages. After it had converted to Christianity by the 11th century, it was influenced by Orthodox Christianity and Bogomilism. This influence maintained the region's status as a religious border zone to the rest of the then-Catholic Europe. The slave trade of first pagan and then Orthodox and Bogomil Christian Slavs were exported to Italy, Spain, and Portugal in Southern Europe, but the major part of the export went to the Islamic Middle East.

The Balkan slave trade was one of the main routes of European Saqaliba-slaves to the Islamic Middle East, alongside the Prague slave trade in the west, and the Black Sea slave trade, the Khazar slave trade and the Bukhara slave trade in the east. It was a major contributor of mamluk slave soldiers for military slavery in the Mamluk Sultanate of Egypt. The Balkan slave trade contributed to the establishment of the Republic of Venice as a prosperous trading empire in the Mediterranean Sea in the early Middle Ages.

In the 15th century, the Balkan slave trade was closed off from Europe due to the Muslim Ottoman conquest of the Balkans, and consequently integrated to the Ottoman slave trade. The end of the Balkan slave trade's supply of slaves to Spain and Portugal contributed to the establishment of the Atlantic slave trade, when there was a demand of slaves to the new Spanish colonies of the New World, and the old Balkans slave supply source had to be replaced by a new source of non-Catholic slaves.

== History ==
=== Background ===
During the Middle Ages, informal slave zones were formed alongside religious borders. Both Christians and Muslims banned the enslavement of people of their own faith, but both approved of the enslavement of people of a different faith.

The slave trade thus organized alongside religious principles. While Christians did not enslave Christians, and Muslims did not enslave Muslims, both did allow the enslavement of people they regarded to be heretics, which for example allowed Catholic Christians to enslave Orthodox Christians, and Sunni Muslims to enslave Shia Muslims.

The slave trade was founded upon the fact that the Balkans was a religious border zone between at first pagan and Christian, and later Catholic and Orthodox Christian lands. Since the custom at the time did not approve of enslaving people of the same religion, this made the Balkans a supply of slaves for both Christian and Muslim lands. Another factor was the fact that the Balkans was for a long time politically decentralized and unstable, and was in the Early Middle Ages known as the Sclaveni or Slav lands. These two factors in combination made the Balkans a fertile target for slave trade, when war captives were sold by their enemies to Venetian slave traders at the coasts.

The most targeted category of the slave trade were the Bosnians, since they were adherents of Bogomilism, a faith which was not acknowledged as Christianity and therefore made them legitimate targets of slavery in Catholic as well as Orthodox Europe.

=== Slave routes ===
The Balkan slave trade was separate from the Black Sea slave trade, which took place on the Eastern shore of the Balkan with center of Genoese Caffa and Venetian Tana. The victims of the Balkan slave trade were not sold via the East Balkan coast but via the sea ports alongside the Adriatic Sea coast, primarily Ragusa (Dubrovnik), a center of the Balkan slave trade, were Venetian merchants bought slaves from Balkan in order to sell them in the Aegean Sea. Venetian slave traders trafficked Balkan slaves from the Balkan west coast across the Adriatic Sea to the Aegean Sea, where Genoese Chios (Lordship of Chios and Maona of Chios and Phocaea) and Venetian Crete (Kingdom of Candia) were transit centers for the export of Balkan slaves to either Spain in the west or Egypt in the south.

A second source of Balkan slaves to the slave center of the Aegean Sea were captives taken during the warfare between the Ottoman Turks, the Byzantine Empire and the Latin crusader states in Greece (Frankokratia). The Ottoman Turks sold Greek and Bulgarian war captives to the Italian slave traders in the slave market of Venetian Crete during the Ottoman conquest of the Balkan.

There were also slaves taken which legally were not considered legitimate targets of enslavement. Albanian children termed anime were sold to Venice via Durazzo (Durrës); since the Albanians were not Bogomils but either Orthodox or Catholic and therefore not officially deemed legitimate for enslavement, they were officially not categorized as slaves but sold as bond servants which were formally claimed to be contract workers.

=== Slave market ===
The slaves were primarily shipped to one of two destinations. A smaller number of slaves were sold in Italy and Spain as enslaved domestic servants, called ancillae. In Italy, the Bogomil slaves were referred to as paterina or pagana, signifying their religious status as Pagans, which were seen as legitimizing their status as slaves. The Balkan slaves sold as slaves in Italy were noted to have been Albanians, Bosnian, Serbs, Slavs, Bulgars, Vlachs, or Ruthenians.

The biggest market for slaves however were the Islamic Middle East, which had been the main market for the Balkan slave trade since the beginning. The slaves normally entered the Middle East via slavery in Egypt, which was also the biggest destination for them. In the Arab world, the Balkan slaves were often termed as rumi.

While the majority of the slaves trafficked to Southern Europe (Italy and Spain) were girls, since they were intended to become ancillae maid servants, the majority of the slaves, around 2,000 annually, were trafficked to the Mamluk Sultanate of Egypt, and in that case most of them were boys, since the Mamluk Sultanate needed a constant supply of slave soldiers, The Balkan slave trade was, alongside the Black Sea slave trade, one of the two main slave supply sources of future Mamluk soldiers to military slavery in the Mamluk Sultanate in Egypt. The Mamluk Sultan Sayf ad-Din Khushqadam (r 1461–1467) was for example originally a victim of the Balkan slave trade and termed a rumi slave prior to his manumission.

In the mid-13th century, Pope Innocent IV criticized Italian merchants export of Bulgarian, Greek, and Ruthenian slaves to the Muslims in Jerusalem.

== End of the slave trade ==
The Balkan slave trade entered difficulties in the 15th century. The Republic of Ragusa banned the slave trade from Ragusa, one of the major sea ports of the Balkan slave trade, in 1416.

The Venetian slave trade from the Balkans gradually ended in parallel with the conquest of the Balkans by the Ottoman Empire during the 15th century. The slave trade from the Balkans was ended as a separate slave trade and was overtaken by the Ottomans and incorporated into the Ottoman slave trade, which in the Balkans was connected to the Black Sea slave trade.

Venetian slave traders were not able to compete with Ottoman-Crimean competition. After this, they acquired a smaller number of slaves from Ottoman slave traders via the trans-Saharan slave trade. The Venetian slave trade was however soon supplanted in Europe by the Atlantic slave trade of the 16th century.

== See also ==
- History of slavery in the Muslim world
- History of concubinage in the Muslim world
- Human trafficking in the Middle East
- Turkish Abductions
- Barbary slave trade
- Kievan Rus' slave trade
- Kazakh Khanate slave trade on Russian settlement
