= Venetian slave trade =

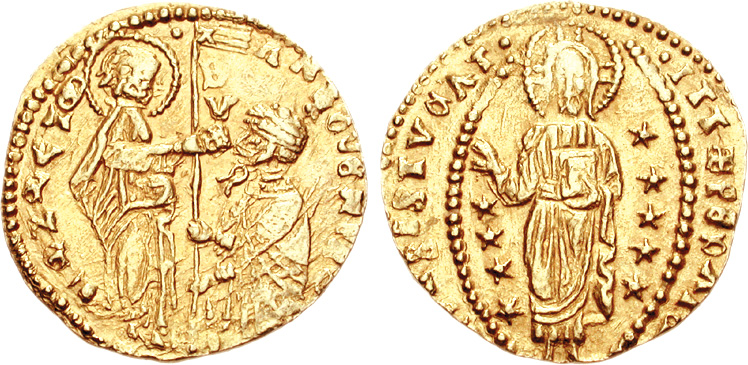
Zecchino Antonio Venier 1382, during the Venetian slave trade.

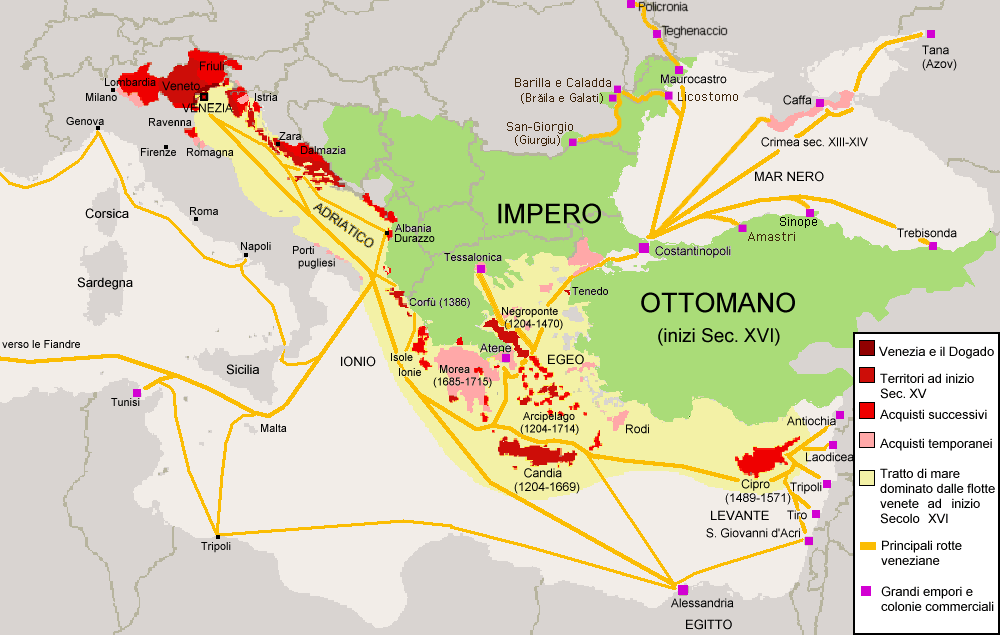
Repubblica di Venezia

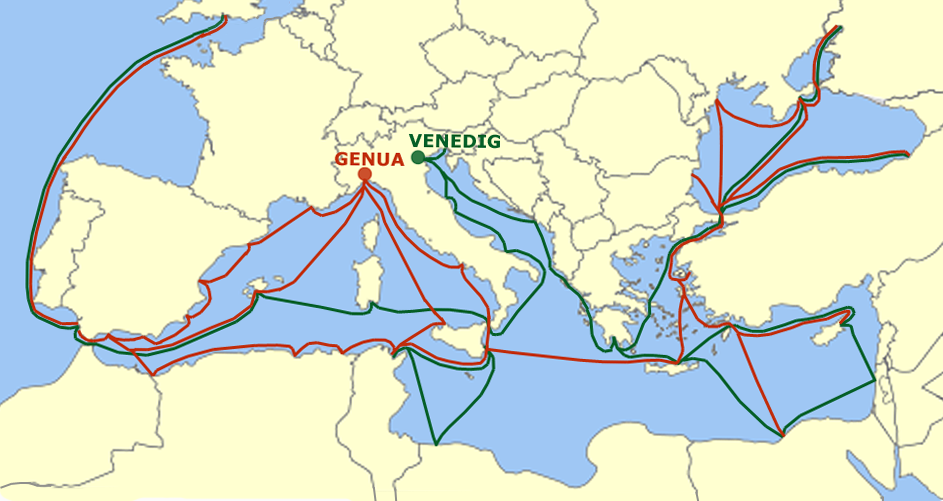
Maritime republics of Genoa (red) and Venice (green) and their trade routes in the Mediterranean region

The Venetian slave trade refers to the slave trade conducted by the Republic of Venice, primarily from the Early Middle Ages to the Late Middle Ages. The slave trade was a contributing factor to the early prosperity of the young Republic of Venice as a major trading empire in the Mediterranean Sea.

The Venetian slave trade was divided into several separate trading routes. In the Balkan slave trade, Venetian merchants bought Pagan war captives and then sold them to Southern Europe or to the Middle East via the Aegean Islands. In the later Black Sea slave trade, the Venetians established colonies in the Crimea, and acquired slaves of various religions to sell to Southern Europe via Crete and the Balearic Islands, or to the Middle East directly via the Black Sea. The Venetians met competition in the slave trade by the Republic of Genoa.

Both slave routes were closed off to Venice due to the conquests of the Ottoman Empire in the 15th century and integrated into the Ottoman slave trade. This ended the old import routes of slaves to Europe, which contributed to the development of the Atlantic slave trade to provide the European colonies in America with slave labor.

== Background ==
During the Middle Ages, informal slave zones were formed alongside religious borders. Both Christians and Muslims banned the enslavement of people of their own faith, but both approved of the enslavement of people of a different faith.

The slave trade thus organized alongside religious principles. While Christians did not enslave Christians, and Muslims did not enslave Muslims, both did allow the enslavement of people they regarded to be heretics, which allowed Catholic Christians to enslave Orthodox Christians, and Sunni Muslims to enslave Shia Muslims.

There was still a market for slavery in medieval Europe in the Early Middle Ages, but it gradually started to be phased out in favor of serfdom. However, there was a major market for slavery in the Muslim Middle East, and European slaves were referred to in the Muslim world as saqaliba. The Republic of Venice was one of the early suppliers of saqaliba slaves to the Muslim world. By the 9th-century, the Republic of Venice was prospering of the slave trade with the Muslim world.

Slavery died out in Western Europe after the 12th century, but the demand for laborers after the Black Death resulted in a revival of slavery in Southern Europe in Italy and in Spain, as well as an increase in the demand for captives to slavery in the Mamluk Sultanate.

== Supply ==
Slave trade in the Republic of Venice was in fact divided into separate slave trade routes. Both the Balkan and the Black Sea routes provided primarily pagan slaves to Southern Europe and, to a larger extent, the Muslim world.

=== Balkans ===
The Balkan slave trade went by route from the Balkans via Venetian slave traders across the Adriatic and the Aegean Seas to the Islamic Middle East, from the 7th century until the Ottoman conquest of the Balkans in the 15th century.

Until the 6th and 7th centuries, the Balkans belonged to the Byzantine Empire, but was split by invasions of the Avars, Slavic tribes, and other peoples. The new peoples populating the Balkans did not initially create any centralized state, which created a situation of permanent political instability on the Balkans. The various tribes conducted warfare against each other and took war captives. Due to the lack of a centralized state to negotiate for ransom, a habit formed in which war captives from the tribal wars on the Balkans were often sold to merchants from the Republic of Venice at the Adriatic coast. This developed into a major slave trade in which Venetians bought captives from the Balkans whom they sold to the Byzantine Empire and the Islamic Middle East, which contributed to the growth of Venice as a major commercial empire by the 11th century.

Venetians purchased slaves in Dalmatia from traders along the Narenta river, and also conducted slave raids themselves to capture slaves in Dalmatia.

The slaves bought by the Venetians at the Adriatic coast were transported by the Venetians to the slave market at the Aegean Islands where the majority continued to Egypt.

=== Italian Peninsula ===
In 748, Venetian slave traders were noted to buy slaves in Rome. Trade in Christian slaves from Western Europe was however deeply disliked by the Catholic church and was stopped early on. In 840, Venice signed a pact with other Italian cities to return fugitive slaves, and to not seize Christians to be sold as slaves.

=== Prague and Central Europe ===
In the Early Middle Ages, Venice also supplied slaves from Central Europe via Prague, which in the 10th-century was a center of slave trade in Europe, dealing in pagan East Slavs.

The Venetian slave traders participated in the Prague slave trade, purchasing slaves as well as metal via the eastern passes of the Alps. The East Slavic pagans were similar to the Balkan pagans and used for sale to the Muslim world as saqaliba slaves.

The Prague slave trade died out in the 11th-century since it could no longer be legitimately supplied when the East Slavs converted to Christianity.

=== Black Sea region ===
Italian merchants, particularly the Genoese and Venetians, who had a large web of contacts as traders in the Mediterranean Sea, early established themselves in the Black Sea slave trade. Initially they did so as traveling merchants, but eventually they managed to acquire their own trading colonies in the Crimea.

In the 13th century, Byzantine control in the Crimea weakened by the sack of Constantinople in 1204, and Italian trade colonies took control over the Black Sea slave trade, with the Republic of Venice establishing in Sudak in the Crimea in 1206 and later in Tana, and the Republic of Genoa in Caffa in 1266.

The majority of the slaves in the Italian Black Sea slave trade came to be enslaved via three main methods; as war captives during warfare, such as the Mongol invasions, the wars between the Golden Horde and the Ilkhanate, and the conquests of Timur; via slave raids; or through parents selling their own children or relatives to slavery, which occurred because of poverty and was a regular and common occurrence especially after the Black Death, when the demand for slaves was high in both Southern Europe and the Middle East.

Common targets of slavery were pagan Finno-Ugric and Turkish people.

In parallel with the establishment of the Italian colonies in the Crimea, the Mongol Empire conquered Russia, and the Italian Black Sea slave trade expanded in parallel with the Mongol warfare, with the Mongols encouraging the trade, using it to dispose of particularly Russian slaves; up until the Russian uprising of 1262, for example, the Mongols sold Russian peasants who were unable to pay tribute to the Italian slave traders in the Crimea.

== Slave market ==
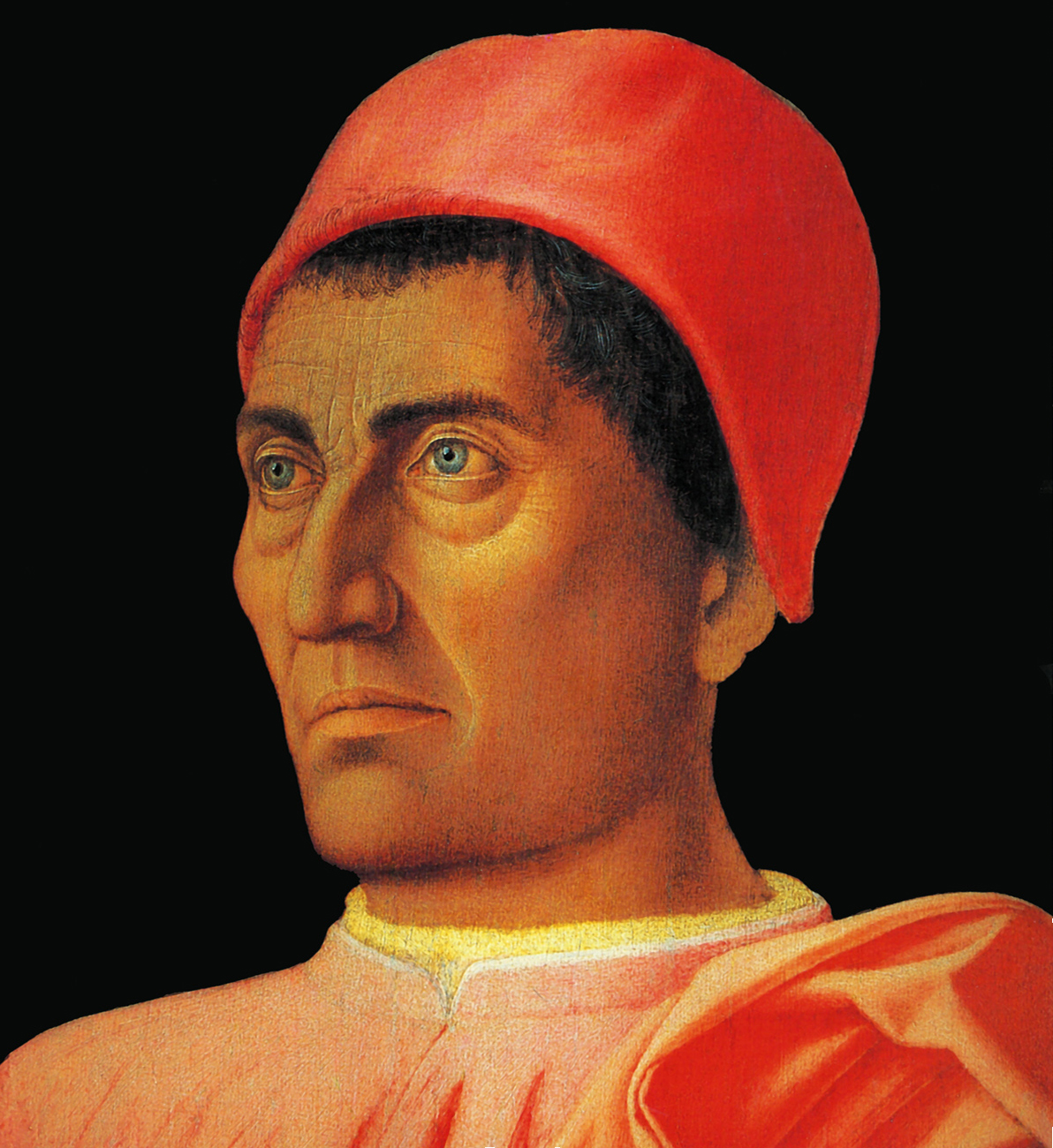
Carlo de' Medici, whose mother Maddalena was a victim of the Venetian slave trade

The slave markets were divided in two. South Europe was supplied with male slaves for hard labor or female slaves for domestic house work as enslaved maidservants or sexual slavery. The Islamic market of the Middle East requested female slaves as domestic house slaves or for sexual slavery as harem concubines; castrated male slaves for eunuchs or intact male slaves for military slavery as slave soldiers.

=== Egypt and the Middle East ===
The Balkan slave trade was, alongside the Black Sea slave trade, one of the two main slave supply sources of future Mamluk soldiers to slavery in the Mamluk Sultanate in Egypt. A smaller number of slaves were sold in Italy and Spain as enslaved domestic servants, called ancillae.

The Italian Black Sea slave trade had two main routes; from the Crimea to Byzantine Constantinople, and via Crete and the Balearic Islands to Italy and Spain; or to the Mamluk Sultanate in Egypt, which received the majority of the slaves.

From at least 1382 onward, the majority of the mamluks of the Egyptian Mamluk sultanate with slave origin came from the Black Sea slave trade; around a hundred Circassian males intended for Mamluks were being trafficked via the Black Sea slave trade until the 19th century.

=== Southern Europe ===
The majority of the slaves trafficked to Southern Europe (Italy and Spain) were girls, since they were intended to become ancillae or as sexual slavery, while the majority of the slaves, around 2,000 annually, were trafficked to the Egyptian Mamluk Sultanate, in that case most of them boys, since the Mamluk Sultanate needed slave soldiers.

Among the slaves was Maddalena, mother of Carlo de' Medici (1428–1492), who is noted to have been a Circassian slave bought in Venice as a "certified virgin" in 1427. There have also been theories that Leonardo da Vinci's mother Caterina was a slave.

== End of the slave trade ==
The Venetian slave trade from the Balkans gradually ended in parallel with the Ottoman conquest of the Balkans during the 15th century. The slave trade from the Balkans was ended as a separate slave trade and was overtaken by the Ottomans and incorporated into the Ottoman slave trade, which in the Balkans was connected to the Crimean slave trade.

After the fall of Constantinople in 1453, the Ottomans closed the trade between the Crimea and the West. The slave trade gradually diminished, and in 1472, only 300 slaves are registered to have been trafficked from Caffa.

From the 1440s, Spain and Portugal started to import their slaves from first the Canary Islands, and then from Africa; initially via the trans-Saharan slave trade from Libya, and then by starting the Atlantic slave trade.

The Ottoman Empire and the Crimean Khanate conquered the Italian cities in the Crimea in 1475, and the slave trade was then taken over by Muslim slave traders.

Venetian slave traders were not able to compete with Ottoman-Crimean competition. After this, they acquired a smaller number of slaves from Ottoman slave traders via the trans-Saharan slave trade. The Venetian slave trade was however soon supplanted in Europe by the Atlantic slave trade of the 16th century.

== See also ==
- Slavery in Egypt
- Genoese slave trade
- Slavery in the Abbasid Caliphate
