= Arab slave trade =

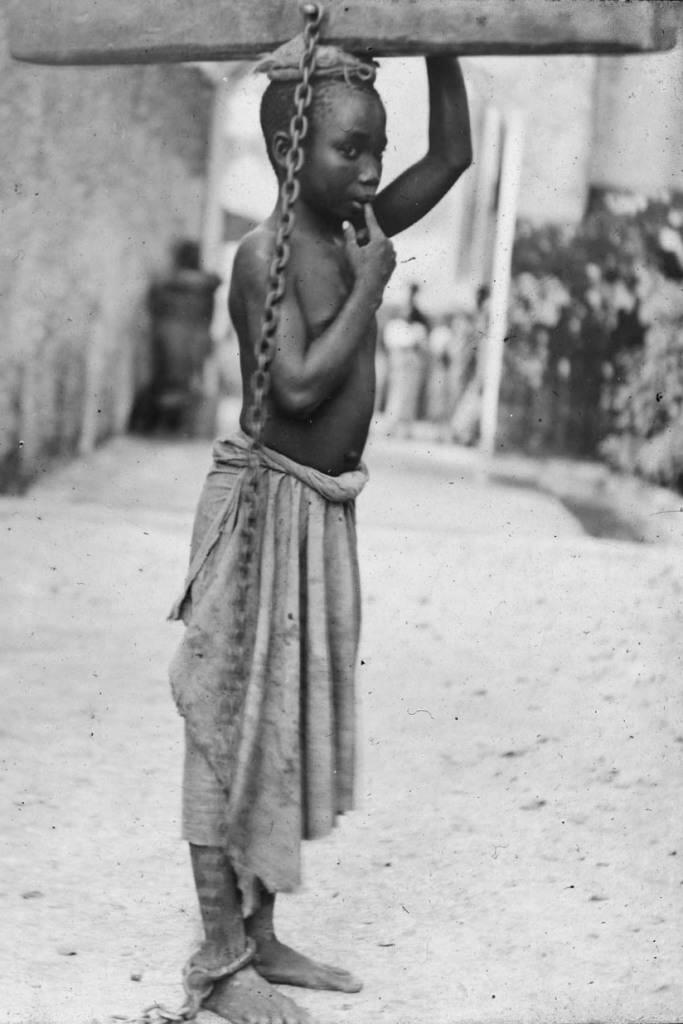
A child slave (abeed in Arabic) in the Sultanate of Zanzibar. 'An Arab master's punishment for a slight offence.' c. 1890.

The Arab slave trade is a traditional term that has historically been used to refer to several different slave trades, which have been carried out under the auspices of Arab peoples or Arab societies. The Arab slave trades are often associated or connected to the history of slavery in the Muslim world. The trans-Saharan slave trade relied on networks of all Arab, Berber, and sub-Saharan African merchants.

From the 7th century to the mid-20th century, an estimated 10 to 18 million Africans were enslaved by Arab slave traders. These African slaves were acquired largely through raiding and trade, and were then trafficked to the Arab world, via the trans-Saharan slave trade, Red Sea slave trade, and Indian Ocean slave trade combined.

== Examples ==
Examples of Arab slave trades are :

- Trans-Saharan slave trade (between the mid-7th century and the mid-20th century)
  - Libyan slave trade (started in the 7th century, ongoing)
- Indian Ocean slave trade (between antiquity and the early 20th-century)
  - Comoros slave trade (from an unknown time until the mid 19th-century)
  - Zanzibar slave trade (from an unknown time until the early 20th-century)
- Red Sea slave trade (between antiquity and the mid-20th-century)

== See also ==
- Saqaliba
- Prague slave trade
- Khazar slave trade
- Volga Bulgarian slave trade
- Black Sea slave trade
- Bukhara slave trade
- Khivan slave trade
- History of slavery in the Muslim world
