= 1923 Qaiwani coup d'état =

Coup in the United Arab Emirates

Coordinates: 25.55°N 55.55°E

1923 Qaiwani coup
- Emirate of Umm al-Quwain in the United Arab Emirates
Date	13 October 1923
Location	Emirate of Umm al-Quwain
Result	Coup Successful: Sheikh Abdullah Al Mualla II killed; Sheikh Hamad Al Mualla installed

Belligerents
(Emirate of Umm Al Quwain) Umm al-Quwain: Bani Qitab	(Emirate of Umm Al Quwain) Senior Al Mualla

Commanders and leaders
(Emirate of Umm Al Quwain) Abdullah Al Mualla II † (Emirate of Umm Al Quwain) Ahmed Al Mualla; Muhammad bin Ali bin Huwaydin	(Emirate of Umm Al Quwain) Hamad Al Mualla

Units involved
(Emirate of Umm Al Quwain) Abdullah loyalists	(Emirate of Umm Al Quwain) Hamad loyalists

Strength
~100 Bani Qitab	1 slave

Casualties and losses
2 (including Abdullah)	1

In 1923 Sheikh Hamad Al Mualla staged a palace coup in Umm al-Quwain after ordering the assassination of his cousin Sheikh Abdullah II, the ruling emir at the time, and was crowned in his place.

== Background ==
Following the premature death of Rashid bin Ahmad Al Mualla from pneumonia in 1922 the senior members of the house of Al Mualla where not present in Umm al-Quwain with the household's slaves taking control of the palace and inviting Rashid's eldest son Abdullah Al Mualla to take the throne. As succession at the time was determined via shura, instead of codified primogeniture, Abdullah feared that his uncles Ibrahim bin Ahmad and Sa'id bin Ahmad would seize power. As such he summoned Muhammad bin Ali bin Huwaydin, leader of the Bani Qitab tribe, and 100 armed men to enter and guard Umm al-Quwain.

Neither Ibrahim nor Sa'id would attempt to seize power, while Sa'id's eldest son Abdullah bin Sa'id was placed under house arrest. However, Sa'id petitioned the British Political Resident that the family was united behind him, and that with British support he could overthrow Abdullah II but the British refused to back him. The British instead attempted to mediate a compromise between Abdullah II and Sa'id, much to the dismay of Abdullah II who refused to meet with the Residency Agent when he visited on September 25, 1923, and instead returned to his summer residence inland.

== Events ==
On October 13, 1923, a slave owned by Hamad Al Mualla, Ibrahim's eldest son, named Ashur stabbed a man from Najd in the local bazaar. Abdullah II summoned Ashur to his palace for a "humiliating punishment" and later that evening, after Abdullah II left his majlis, Ashur followed him into his private room and shot him. Ashur also shot and killed another slave before Abdullah II's 14-year-old brother Ahmad was able to kill Ashur with a shot from a rifle.

According to historian Rosemarie Said Zahlan the stabbing in the bazaar and subsequent assassination of Abdullah II by Ashur was a plot orchestrated by Hamad to seize power while avoiding the guards, meanwhile, the British Residency agent insisted that Ashur acted alone. Regardless, the 14 year old Ahmad attempted to cling to power, but during Abdullah II's funeral Hamad had forces loyal to him snuck into the palace and seized the government's offices proclaiming himself to be the new Sheikh before Ahmad could react.

== Aftermath ==
Hamad's father Ibrahim urged him to abandon his claim to the throne out of fear for his life, which Hamad refused. Instead Hamad was able to negotiate a settlement with Ahmad and the local tribal leaders to confirm his rule, which would be confirmed by the British on November 11, 1923. Hamad was also able to negotiate a settlement with Sa'id and was left with no serious challenges to his rule.

Another uncle, Abd al-Rahman bin Ahmad Al Mualla, would stage a counter-coup in 1929 after Hamad welcomed Khalid bin Ahmad Al Qasimi, the former leader of Sharjah who had been deposed in his own coup in 1924, into the country, leading to a standoff between Sharjah and Umm al-Quwain. Hamad would be killed in the coup, and replaced with Ahmad.
