= Prague slave trade =

9th-11th century enslavement of Slavic people

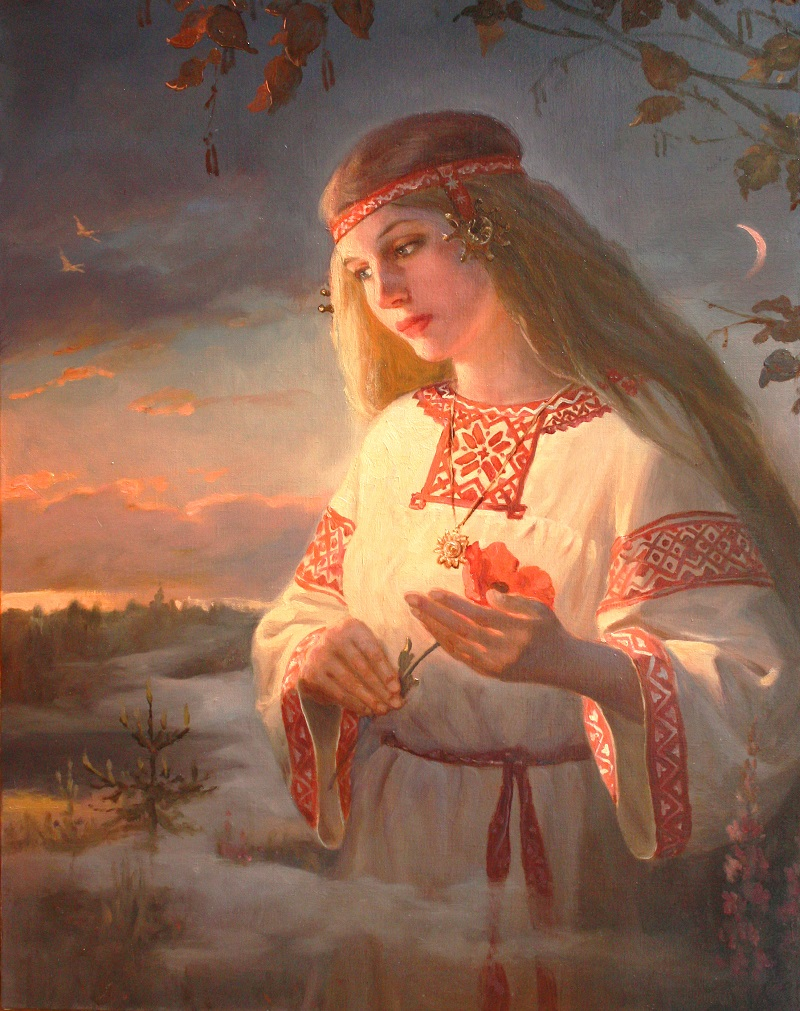
The Goddess Zorya of the Slavic religion. The fact that the Slavs were pagans legitimized them as targets for enslavement in the eyes of Christians, Muslims and Jews.

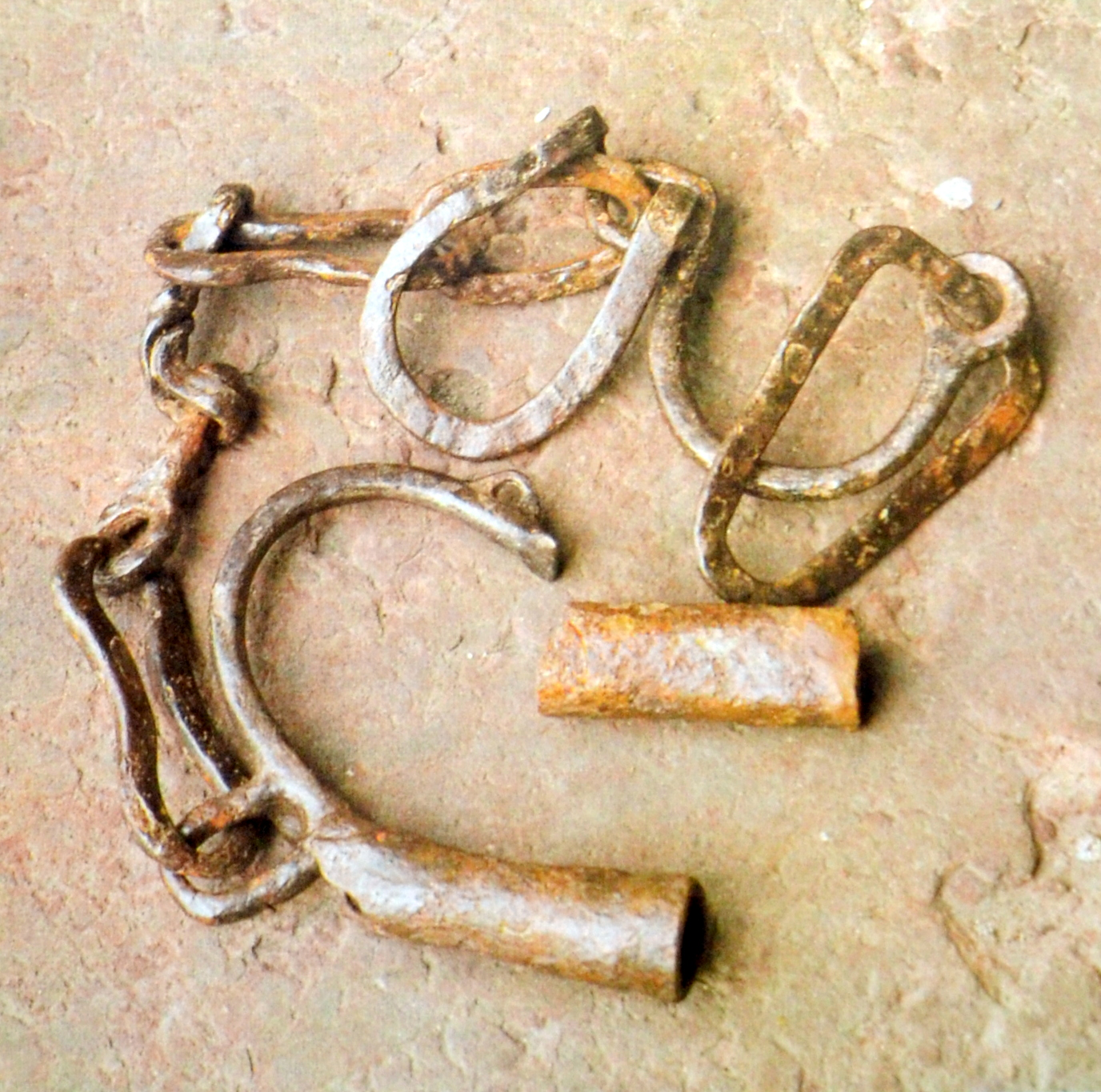
Iron restraints, 11th or 12th century, from Neu Niekohr

Duchy of Bohemia in c. 1000.

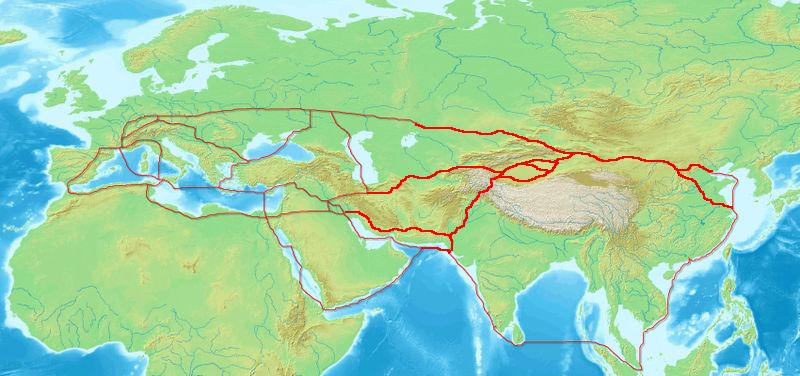
The Radhanite trade routes.

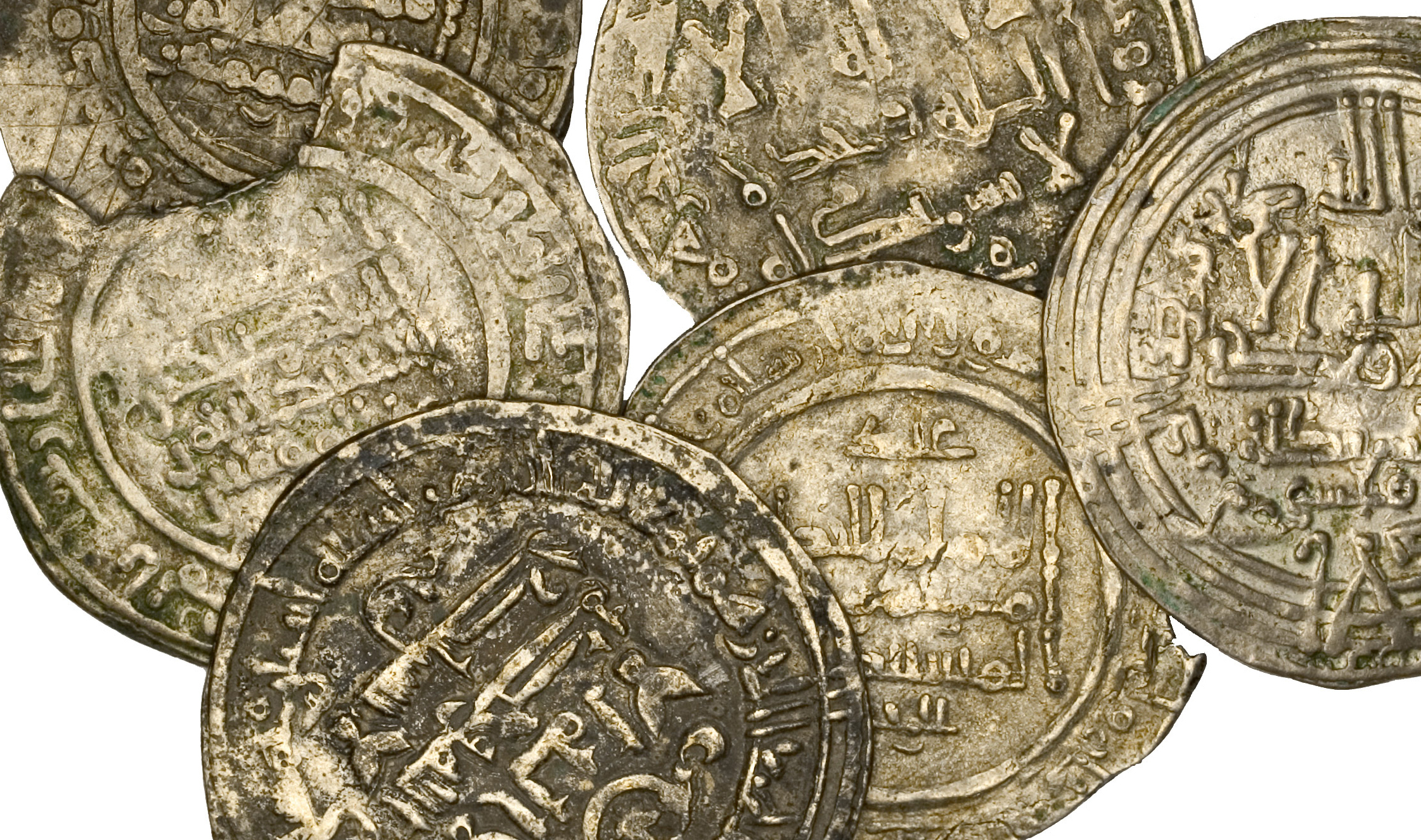
Andalusian coins

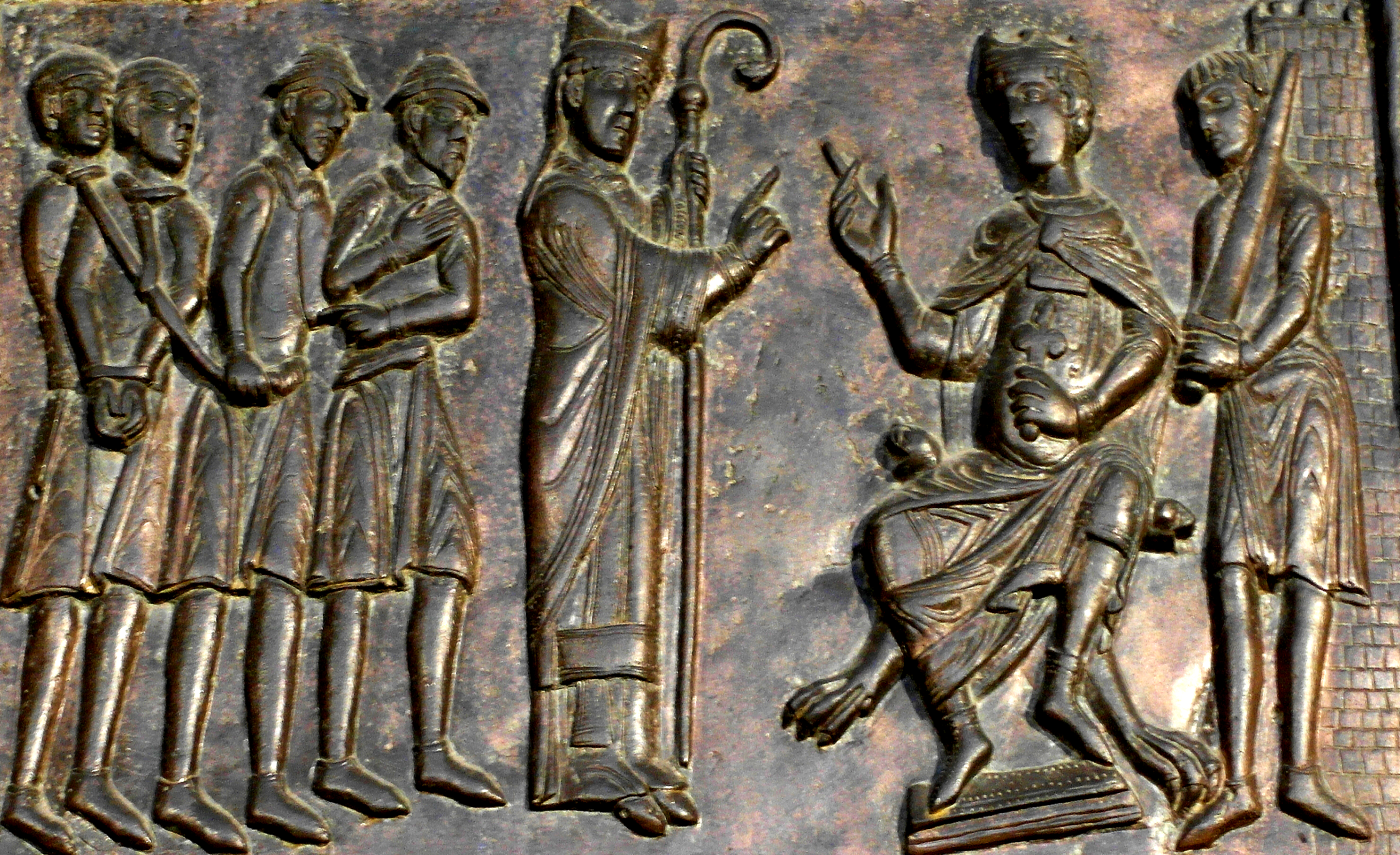
Saint Adalbert of Prague pleads with Boleslaus II, Duke of Bohemia, for the release of Christians slaves by their masters, Jewish merchants, Gniezno Door c. 1170

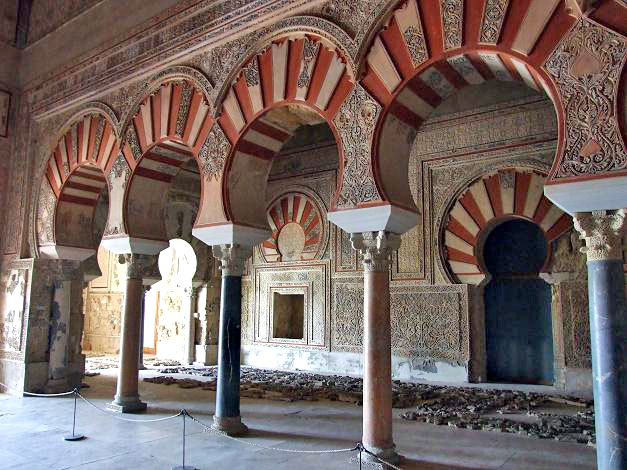
Madinat al-Zahra.

The Prague slave trade refers to the slave trade conducted between the Duchy of Bohemia and the Caliphate of Córdoba in Moorish al-Andalus in roughly the 9th–11th century in the Early Middle Ages. The Duchy's capital of Prague was the center of this slave trade, and internationally known as one of the biggest slave trade centers in Europe at that time.

The Prague slave trade is known as one of the main routes of saqaliba-slaves to the Muslim world, alongside the Balkan slave trade by the Republic of Venice in the south, and the Volga route of the Vikings via Volga Bulgaria and the Samanid slave trade in the east.

The Duchy of Bohemia was a new state in Christian Europe at this time, bordering the lands of pagan Slavs to the north and east. Pagans were considered as legitimate targets of enslavement both by Christian and Islamic law. Bohemia was thereby able to traffic pagan captives to the slave market of the Muslim Caliphate of Cordoba through Christian France without trouble. The Prague slave trade was a mutual trade of benefit between the Caliphate of Córdoba, who were dependent on slaves to manage their state bureaucracy and military, and the Duchy of Bohemia, whose new state rose to economic prominence due to the trade.

The Prague slave trade was dependent upon supply of pagan captives to maintain the slave trade with Muslim al-Andalus via Christian Europe, and therefore lost its supply source when Eastern Europe started to adopt Christianity. In parallel, in the early 11th century, both the Caliphate of Cordoba as well as the Duchy of Bohemia went through a period of political instability.

== Background ==
In Western Europe, a major slave trade route went from Prague in Central Europe via France to Moorish Al-Andalus, which was both a destination for the slaves as well as center of slave trade to the rest of the Muslim world in the Middle East. Prague in the Duchy of Bohemia, which was a recently Christianized state in the early 10th century, became a major center of the European slave trade in between the 9th and 11th centuries. The revenue from the Prague slave trade has been named as one of the economic foundations of the Bohemian state, financing the armies necessary to form a centralized state, which was not uncommon for the new Christian state in Eastern Europe.

The Duchy of Bohemia was a state in a religious border zone, bordering to pagan Slavic lands to the north, east, and southeast. In the Middle Ages, religion was the determining factor on who was considered a legitimate target for enslavement. Christians prohibited Christians from enslaving other Christians, and Muslims prohibited Muslims from enslaving other Muslims; however both approved of the enslavement of pagans, who thereby became a lucrative target for slave traders.

In the 9th and 10th centuries, the Slavs in Eastern Europe were still adherents of the Slavic religion, making them pagans to the Christians and infidels to the Muslims, and thereby considered as legitimate targets for enslavement by both. Bohemia, being a religious border state close to pagan lands, were thus in an ideal position to engage in slave trade with both Christians and Muslims, having access to a close supply of pagan captives. The slaves were acquired through slave raids toward the pagan Slavic lands north of Prague.

The pagan Slavic tribes of Central and Eastern Europe were targeted for slavery by several actors in the frequent military expeditions and raids alongside their lands. During the military campaigns of Charlemagne and his successor in the 9th century, pagan Slavs were captured and sold by the Christian Franks along the Danube and Elbe Rivers, and by the mid 10th-century, Prague had become a big center of the slave trade in Slavic pagans to al-Andalus via France.

== Supply ==
Prague was known in all Europe as a major slave trade center. Captives sold as slaves via Prague were supplied by several routes.

=== Dukes of Bohemia ===
The armies of the Dukes of Bohemia captured pagan Slavs from the east in expeditions to the lands later known as Poland to supply the slave market, which brought considerable profit to the Dukes.

Several sources from the 10th century mentioned how the Dukes were involved in supplying the Prague slave market and that the slaves normally came from lands corresponding to what later corresponded to southern Poland and western Ukraine.

The Dukes of Bohemia, particularly Boleslaus I (r. 935–972) and Boleslaus II (r. 972–999), regularly provided the Prague slave market with new pagan captives from expeditions to the northeast.

=== Vikings ===
Another supply came from the Vikings. The Vikings were known to be suppliers of slaves to the Islamic market via other routes. People taken captive during the Vikings raids in Western Europe could be sold to Moorish Spain via the Dublin slave trade or transported via the Volga trade route to Russia, where slaves were sold to Muslim merchants in the Khazar Kaghanate, and Volga Bulgaria and from there by caravan to Khwarazm and finally to the Abbasid Caliphate via the Samanid slave market in Central Asia.

While the slaves sold by the Vikings via the eastern route could be Christian Western Europeans, the slaves provided by the Vikings to the slave route of Prague-Magdeburg-Verdun were pagan Slavs, who in contrast to Christians were legitimate for other Christians to enslave and sell as slaves to Muslims; according to Liutprand of Cremona, these slaves were trafficked to slavery in al-Andalus via Verdun, were some of them were selected to undergo castration to become eunuchs for the Muslim slave market in al-Andalus.

=== Poles ===
Slaves were also provided by the Slavs themselves as war captives during the unification of Poland under Mieszko I. To sustain this military machine and meet other state expenses, large amounts of revenue were necessary. Greater Poland had some natural resources used for trade, such as fur, hide, honey and wax, but those surely did not provide enough income. According to Ibrahim ibn Yaqub, Prague in Bohemia, a city built of stone, was the main center for the exchange of trading commodities in this part of Europe.

From Kraków, the Slavic traders brought tin, salt, amber, and other products they had, most importantly slaves; Muslim, Jewish, Hungarian, and other traders were the buyers of the Prague slave market. The Life of St. Adalbert, written at the end of the 10th century by John Canaparius, records the fate of many Christian slaves sold in Prague as the main curse of the time. Dragging of shackled slaves is shown as a scene in the 12th-century bronze Gniezno Doors. It may well be that the territorial expansion financed itself by being the source of loot, of which the captured local people were the most valuable part. The scale of the human trade practice is arguable, however, because much of the population from the defeated tribes was resettled for agricultural work or in the near-gord settlements, where they could serve the victors in various capacities and thus contribute to the economic and demographic potential of the state. Considerable increase of population density was characteristic of the newly established states in Eastern and Central Europe. With the slave trade insufficient to meet all revenue needs, the Piast state had to look for other options.

Mieszko thus strove to subdue Pomerania at the Baltic coast. The area was the site of wealthy trade emporia, frequently visited by traders, especially from the east, west and north. Mieszko had every reason to believe that great profits would have resulted from his ability to control the rich seaports situated on long distance trade routes such as Wolin, Szczecin, and Kołobrzeg.

== Trade ==
Traditionally, the slave traders acquiring the slaves in Prague and transporting them to the slave market of al-Andalus are said to have been dominated by the Jewish Radhanite merchants. Pope Gelasius I (492) permitted Jews to transport slaves from Gaul to Italy on the condition that they were Pagans, and by the time of Pope Gregory the Great (590-604), Jews were a dominating actor in the slave trade.

While Christians were not allowed to enslave Christians and Muslims not allowed to enslave Muslims, Jewish slave traders had the advantage to move freely across religious borders, and supply Muslim slaves to the Christian world and Christian slaves to the Muslim world. as well as Pagan slaves to both. The Moorish Jewish merchant Ibrahim ibn Yaqub of Cordoba has described the trade in Slavic slaves as one of the goods exported from Prague to al-Andalus by Jewish and Muslim merchants. Ibn Yaqub, who likely visited Prague in 961, described how slave traders visited the Prague slave market from Krakow and Hungary to buy slaves. According to ibn Yaqub, Byzantine Jews regularly bought pagan Slavs at the Prague slave market.

In contrast to the Viking slave trade with saqaliba slaves to the Middle East via the Khazar slave trade and the Volga Bulgarian slave trade to slavery in the Abbasid Caliphate via the Samanid slave trade in Central Asia, there are no Arab silver dirham hoards from the saqaliba slave trade in Prague, and the slave traders in Prague would have been paid by Frankish or Jewish middlemen with luxury goods. Marek Jankowiak argues that one payment used by Jewish merchants who bought slaves at the market in Prague in the 9th and 10th-century for the Moorish slave market was small pieces of cloth, which were used as an exchange rate for silver.

The slaves were transported from Prague to Al-Andalus via France. While the church discouraged the sale of Christian slaves to Muslims, the sale of pagans to Muslims was not met with such opposition. Louis the Fair granted his permission to Jewish merchants to traffic slaves through his kingdom provided they were non-baptized pagans.

The Prague slave trade was connected to merchants from Mainz and Verdun and other Western Frankish cities, through which the slaves were trafficked toward al-Andalus; these merchants were often but not always Jewish. The Jews of Verdun are noted to have bought slaves and sold them off to al-Andalus, and many Moorish Jews profited of the slave trade. Both Christians and Muslims were prohibited from performing castrations, but there was no such ban for Jews, which made it possible for them to meet the great demand for eunuchs in the Muslim world.

== Slave market ==
=== Export ===
Prague was one of the routes that supplied slaves to the Venetian slave traders, who purchased slaves as well as metal from Prague via the Eastern passes of the Alps, for sale to slavery in Egypt.

The most lucrative slave market was however the Islamic slavery in Al-Andalus. The Arabic Caliphate of Córdoba referred to the forests of Central and Eastern Europe, which came to function as a slave source supply, as the Bilad as-Saqaliba ("land of the slaves"). The Prague slave market was a part of a big net of slave trade in European saqaliba slaves to the Muslim world. Ibn Hawqal wrote in the 10th century:

"The country [of the Saqaliba] is long and wide....Half of their country...is raided by the Khurasanis [Khorezm] who take prisoners from it, while its northern half is raided by the Andalusians who buy them in Galicia, in France, in Lombardy and in Calabria so as to make them eunuchs, and thereafter they ferry them over to Egypt and Africa. All the Saqaliba eunuchs in the world come from Andalusia....They are castrated near this country. The operation is performed by Jewish merchants."

In Islamic lands, the slave market had specific requirements. Female slaves were used for either domestic or sexual slavery as concubines. Male slaves were used for one of two categories: either for military slavery or as eunuchs. The latter category of male slaves were subjected to castration for the market. Many male slaves selected to be sold as eunuchs were subjected to castration in Verdun. Most saqaliba slaves would have been prepubescent children when castrated.

In Moorish al-Andalus, European saqaliba slaves were considered as exotic display objects with their light hair, skin and eye colors. Female saqaliba slaves were sought after as either enslaved maidservants or for sexual slavery as harem concubines. Female slaves were physically examined by matrons employed by the muntashib and categorized as 'distinguished', which meant they were deemd suitable to be sold for sexual slavery or as entertainmers; or as 'gross', which meant they were classified as suited only to be sold as house slaves for household work. Male saqaliba slaves were either castrated and sold as eunuchs, or kept intact and sold for use for military slavery as slaves soldiers; male saqaliba slaves were also used for a number of domestic and bureaucratic positions. The nature of the market for saqaliba slaves meant that most saqaliba slaves would have been prepubescent children when enslaved.

White European slaves were viewed as luxury goods in al-Andalus, where they could be sold for as much as 1,000 dinars, a substantial price. Saqaliba slaves were viewed as luxury goods and often used as urban domestic staff and in the Royal Palace; during the reign of the Umayyad Caliphs Abd al-Rahman III (912-961) and al-Hakam II (961-976), between 3,750 and 6,087 saqaliba slaves were listed to have lived in the Royal Palace of Madinat al-Zahra as slave concubines or eunuchs, and hundreds of slaves are estimated to have been imported every year.

The slaves were not always destined for the al-Andalus market; similar to Bohemia in Europe, al-Andalus was a religious border state for the Muslim world, and saqaliba slaves were exported from there further to the Muslim world in the Middle East.

The Duchy of Bohemia and the Caliphate of Córdoba were both dependent on each other because of the from the slave trade; the Caliphate of Córdoba was dependent on enslaved bureaucrats and slave soldiers to build and manage their centralized state, while the new state of the Duchy of Bohemia built their economic prosperity in the profit earned by the slave trade with the Caliphate.

=== Slavery in Bohemia ===
Prague was however not only used for the export of slaves to foreign lands. Slavery existed in Bohemia until at least the late 12th century.

In the Duchy of Bohemia, slaves were referred to as servi or ancillae, and were mainly owned as agricultural laborers by the Bohemian landlords. The rights and regulations of the institution of slavery in Bohemia is noted in the law edict of Břetislav I from 1039. A person could become a slave by several methods: by being taken captive, for example during warfare; by being born into slavery; by selling themselves to slavery; or by being condemned to slavery as punishment for a crime, which was clearly outlined in the 1039 law edict of Břetislav I.

The Bohemian custom to enslave war prisoners and performed slave raids are documented on several occasions during the Middle Ages. In 869, the Annales Fuldenses described how the Bohemians abducted and enslaved women and children during their warfare against Bavaria in the West; in 1015, the Bohemians enslaved over a thousand men aside from an unknown number of women and children during a raid against Poland in the North; in both 1093 and again in 1132-34, slave raids were conducted toward Selesia in the North; and in 1109, a slave raid was conducted toward Hungary in the South.

During the 12th century, slavery started to disappear in Europe north of the Alps, influenced by the principle of the church that Christians should not own other Christians as slaves, which made it harder to acquire and keep slaves after all of Europe had become Christian. This also affected Bohemia. The neighbors of Bohemia had all become Christian, and the slave raids and the custom of enslaving war prisoners could no longer be practiced in Bohemia. After about 1150, all references to existing slaves disappeared from the documents in Bohemia, and after a raid by Duke Soběslav II to Austria in 1176, turning captives into servants, Bohemia no longer conducted slave raids.

In addition to the anti-slavery rhetoric of the church, the economy of Bohemia transformed to a money based economy which made chattel slavery unprofitable, and in the second half of the 12th century, slavery was phased out and replaced by serfdom in Bohemia.

The former rural agricultural slave-laborers and the free peasant class of Bohemia merged to form one peasantry, whose rights were regulated in the 13th century and transformed in to become serfdom. Serfdom in Bohemia was finally abolished by the Serfdom Patent (1781).

== End of the slave trade ==
The saqaliba slave trade from Prague to al-Andalus via France lost its religious legitimacy when the pagan Slavs of the north started to gradually adopt Christianity from the late 10th century, which made them out of bounds for Christian Bohemia to enslave and sell to Muslim al-Andalus. The Prague slave trade was not able to legitimately supply their slave pool after the Slavs gradually adopted Christianity from the late 10th century onward. Christian Europe did not approve of Christian slaves, and as Europe adopted Christianity almost entirely by the 11th-century, slavery died out in Western Europe North of the Alps in the 12th and 13th centuries.

The disintegration of the Caliphate of Córdoba in the early 11th century, which was completed by 1031, corresponded to a period of instability in the Duchy of Bohemia in parallel with the end of the slave trade between Bohemia and the Caliphate.

== See also ==
- Slavery in Al-Andalus
- Russian conquest of Bukhara
- Slavery in Central Asia
- Crimean slave trade
- Khivan slave trade
- Turkish slaves in the Delhi Sultanate
