= Turkish slaves in the Delhi Sultanate =

Slavery of Turkic peoples in the Delhi Sultanate

Turkic slaves throughout the Islamic world, particularly in the Delhi Sultanate, were valued members of society. Their value, for their patrons, was their military capabilities, their loyalty and discipline. Their ability to capitalize on opportunity for social mobility, while maintaining their own unique cultural identity created an interesting tension in their social narrative. Their slave origins created a discrepancy in their nobility. This discrepancy was often alluded to in commentary by the Persian Chroniclers of the time.

== Origins ==
The need to secure the Sultanate regime from Mongol marauders led to the delineation of a frontier that needed to be defended. To guard the Punjab marches, there was increasingly more and more slaves that were being bought. Their allegiance was not along ethnic lines, and their dedicated patronage allowed them to incorporate themselves into the military hierarchy as trusted officers and commanders. The Sultanate bought Turks in order to develop a strong cavalry arm and in particular to amass a corps of mounted archers. This was a proprietary way to build their military capacity, by taking advantage of a unique skillset. Jalaluddin Firuz Khalji and Ghiyath al-Din Tughluq were both frontier military commanders. When they tried to capitalize on their achievements, and take over the Delhi Sultanate they were not given support because of their un-noble origins. When looking at the high level of military success, advancement and capacity that the Turkic slaves added, it is disproportionate to popular sentiment regarding their Turkic origins.

== Turkicness ==
The Delhi Sultanate was shaped in many ways by the Turkic soldiers. To a significant extent the early Delhi Sultans, themselves of Turkic origin, deliberately sought to import exclusive signs of "Turkicness". The Persian Chroniclers had to learn the Turkic language, and the Turkic language spread throughout the Sultanate. It is undeniable that the Turks strongly resisted cultural influences whether Hindu or Buddhist, and retained their unique identity which actually centered around a Persian culture and Islam. Turks, being brought into a foreign land, having no particular ethnic allegiance still maintained a cultural identity. In addition to holding high rank in the military, certain Turks, that were particularly dedicated to their patron also enjoyed holding ceremonial positions in court. The sultans even honored non-Turks with Turkic titles.

== Social status ==
As one Sufi saint noted "they were slaves, not learned in the secretarial or Islamic sciences, they were rude, bellicose and vain and their military calling undoubtedly led to unjust killing of innocent people". One can see when viewing how the institution of Turkic slaves in the Delhi sultanate created a problem. Their excellence was preceded by slave origins. These origins were often not spoken of, where possible, in order to create a more refined image. The quality of being a Turk per se, was not a problem it was their slave origin that created a challenge. It was ironic that these marginalized groups happened to be the political elites and Sultans of Delhi in itself creates a telling commentary on the incomplete state of evidence and the dire need to rewrite the narrative of the sultanate.

== Life in the Sultanate ==
There existed a racial divide among the Persians and the Arabs, this was displayed in social riots. The free counterparts to the slaves were distinct members of society, and were not able to predicate the term to which the Sultanate and the slaves would maintain its power. Authority was derived mostly from their patronage, and while they were deployed as military slaves it did not hinder their ability to seize political power. Their privileged job opportunities were not invulnerable to critique because of their slave origin. This shows that while status within the Sultanate can be seen through post - their origins were inescapable social paradigms. This is a subtle continuity of the hierarchical class structure based on birth from the Indian caste system. They were termed 'new Muslims' within the Sultanate.

== Reputation ==
Turkic slavery was very distinct from the conventional idea of a slave-master relationship. While it was based on subservience, the high ranking positions and yielded power that resulted from their careers created an aura of power, rather than weakness and submission. Their reputation did not hinge on social status but on their relationship and their career. They had a mixed reputation for greed and turbulence as well as for martial accomplishments and perseverance in Islam. They had subordinates of their own, and they had a level of autonomy that created a dismay from onlookers who were aware of their Slavic origins. Within the Sultanate, which was composed of Hindus, Buddhists, Muslims, Turks, Afghans and many other groups - the reputation of the Turks was of high stature - regarding them as elites in the community.

== Impact ==
The infusion of immigrants from the Afghan Punjab frontier into the Delhi Sultanate helped shape its future. Social and cultural history of Muslim society, and the reproduction of authority within the Delhi Sultanate can be attributed to these slaves. Their ambition was often degraded by their social status, through the scope of the existing ideals of the Persian Chroniclers and the institutionalized caste system of the Hindus. The outsiders, the deployed slaves, and their purpose can be said to be more than just military assets. They created for themselves their own circles of elites. They did this while maintaining their identity. Their language spread throughout the sultanate. Their story, often eluded by the narratives of the time, is one of dedication and discipline. Skills and expertise in battle acted as a catalyst to gain favor, reverence, that lead to high ranking positions which placed them as an authority in a heterogeneous society. The deliberate tension within the Delhi Sultanate due to their Turkic origins, only further displays their importance in society. The role of the Sultans, as former slaves, and their attempt to spread Turkicness, by electing Turkic titles to non-Turks, and by incorporating the Turkic slave into high governing ranks in the court - shapes the landscape both socially and politically. These 'new Muslims' helped shape the identity of the Delhi Sultanate and help instill Islamic culture into this Indian kingdom.

== Studies ==
In the broader context of learning about South Asian history, one can find an inconclusive range of facts surrounding the portrayal of day-to-day life. Often, certain aspects of society or identity are left out because either they are thought to be insignificant or not part of the greater narrative. As one can see in the example of the Turkic slaves, the court chroniclers chose to elude aspects of their history. So, as the authors that have been referenced in this article have done, one must piece together the puzzle. To do this, the authors thought outside the box and looked beyond court scribes, into memoirs, personal letters, and documents indirectly linked to the topic. Turkic slaves provide a narrative of capitalizing on opportunity, building authority, and creating a reputation so large that its true origins had to be hidden, for they may tarnish views on their accomplishments. It is also questioned if the deployment into the frontiers and employment into the Delhi Sultanate a way for the 'Turkic' culture to flourish or it was a way to ensure the authority of Islam could flourish, through the installation of military men into the capital.

== See also ==
- History of slavery in the Muslim world
- Ziauddin Barani
- Bukhara slave trade
