= Bukhara slave trade =

Slave trade in Bukhara until the 19th century

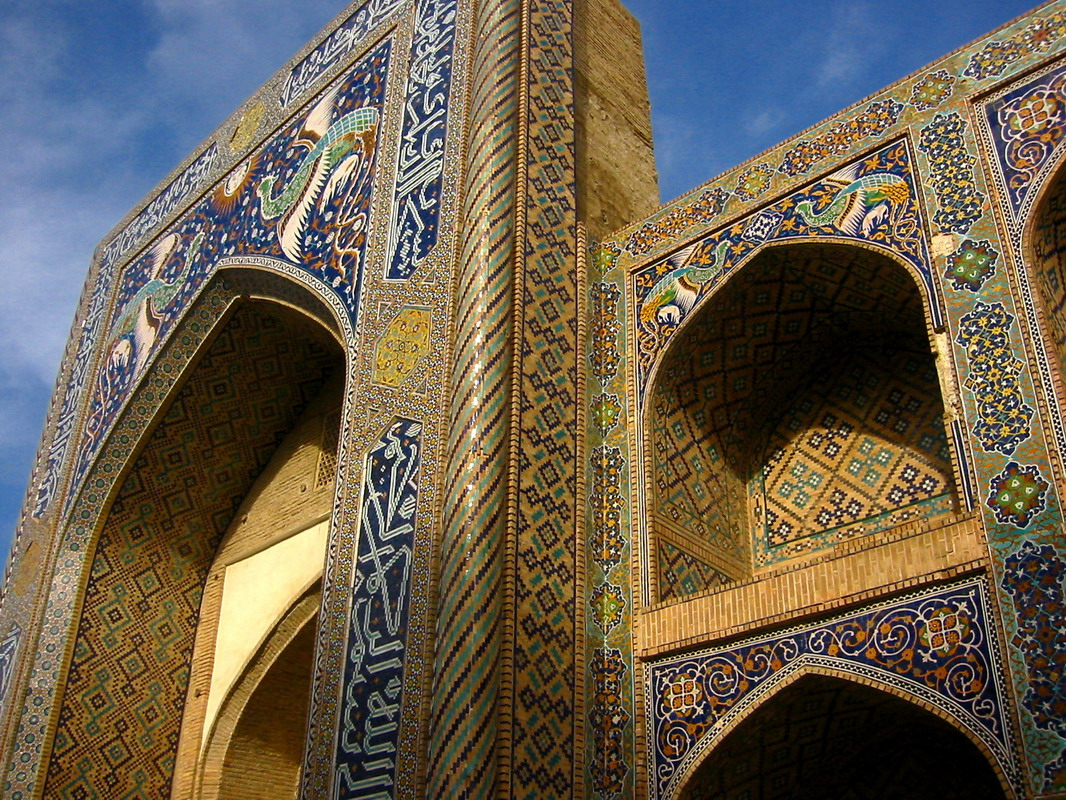
Mosque in Bukhara.

The Bukhara slave trade refers to the historical slave trade conducted in the city of Bukhara in Central Asia (present-day Uzbekistan) from antiquity until the 19th century. Bukhara and nearby Khiva were known as the major centers of slave trade in Central Asia for centuries until the completion of the Russian conquest of Central Asia in the late 19th century.

The city of Bukhara was an important trade center along the ancient Silk Road, through which slaves were traded between Europe and Asia. In the Middle Ages, Bukhara came to lie in the religious border zone between the Muslim and non-Muslim world, which was seen as a legitimate target of slavery by Muslims, and referred to as the "Eastern Dome of Islam". It became the center of the massive slave trade of the Samanid Empire, who bought saqaliba (European) slaves from the Kievan Rus' and sold them on to the Middle East, and as such constituted one of the main trade routes of saqaliba slaves to the Muslim world. The conquests and plundering of the Ghaznavid Empire brought a large number of slaves from India into the markets of Bukhara in the 10th and 11th centuries. Bukhara was also a center for the trade of non-Muslim Turkic slaves from Central Asia to the Middle East and India, where they composed the main ethnicity of ghilman (military slaves) for centuries.

In the early modern age, the contemporaneous Emirate of Bukhara met competition in the slave trade with the nearby Khanate of Khiva, but continued to function as a major slave trade center for non-Muslim slaves to Central Asia and the Middle East. In this time period the main traded demographics were Christian Eastern Europeans, who were acquired by a trading connection with the Crimean slave trade in the Black Sea, Shia Iranians, who were seen as heathens and whose slavery was therefore considered legitimate by the local Sunni authorities, and Hindu Indians acquired from raids and trade.The ancient Bukhara slave trade was not closed until its closure was forced upon the Emir of Bukhara by the Russians in 1873.

== Background ==
Bukhara was a city along the Silk Road since ancient times, and was thus a center of trade. Bukhara is known from at least 6th century BC. The city was a part of Persia in antiquity and the First Turkic Khaganate.

During the Middle Ages, the city fell after the Islamic conquest of Persia and was a part of the Abbasid Caliphate before gaining independence during the Samanid Empire. Bukhara has been called a center of Islam in Central Asia, or the "Eastern Dome of Islam".

== Antiquity ==
The ancient Silk Road connecting the Mediterranean world and China in East Asia may have existed as early as the 3rd century BC, since Chinese silk has been found in Rome has been dated to about 200 BC. The Silk Road connected to the Mediterranean world via two routes, which met in Bukhara, who thus served as an important center in the Silk Road trade.

From China, the Silk Road continued over the Tian Shan, Hami, Turpan, Almalik, Tashkent, Samarkand, and finally Bukhara, where it split in two main roads: a southern route from Bukhara to Merv and from there to Antioch, Trebizond, or Aleppo; or the northern route from Bukhara over the Karakum Desert to the Caspian Sea, Astrakhan, and Kazan close to the Black Sea.

The Silk Road did not sell only textiles, jewels, metals, and cosmetics, but also slaves connecting the Silk Road slave trade to the Bukhara slave trade as well as the Black Sea slave trade.

== Samanid Empire (9th–10th centuries) ==
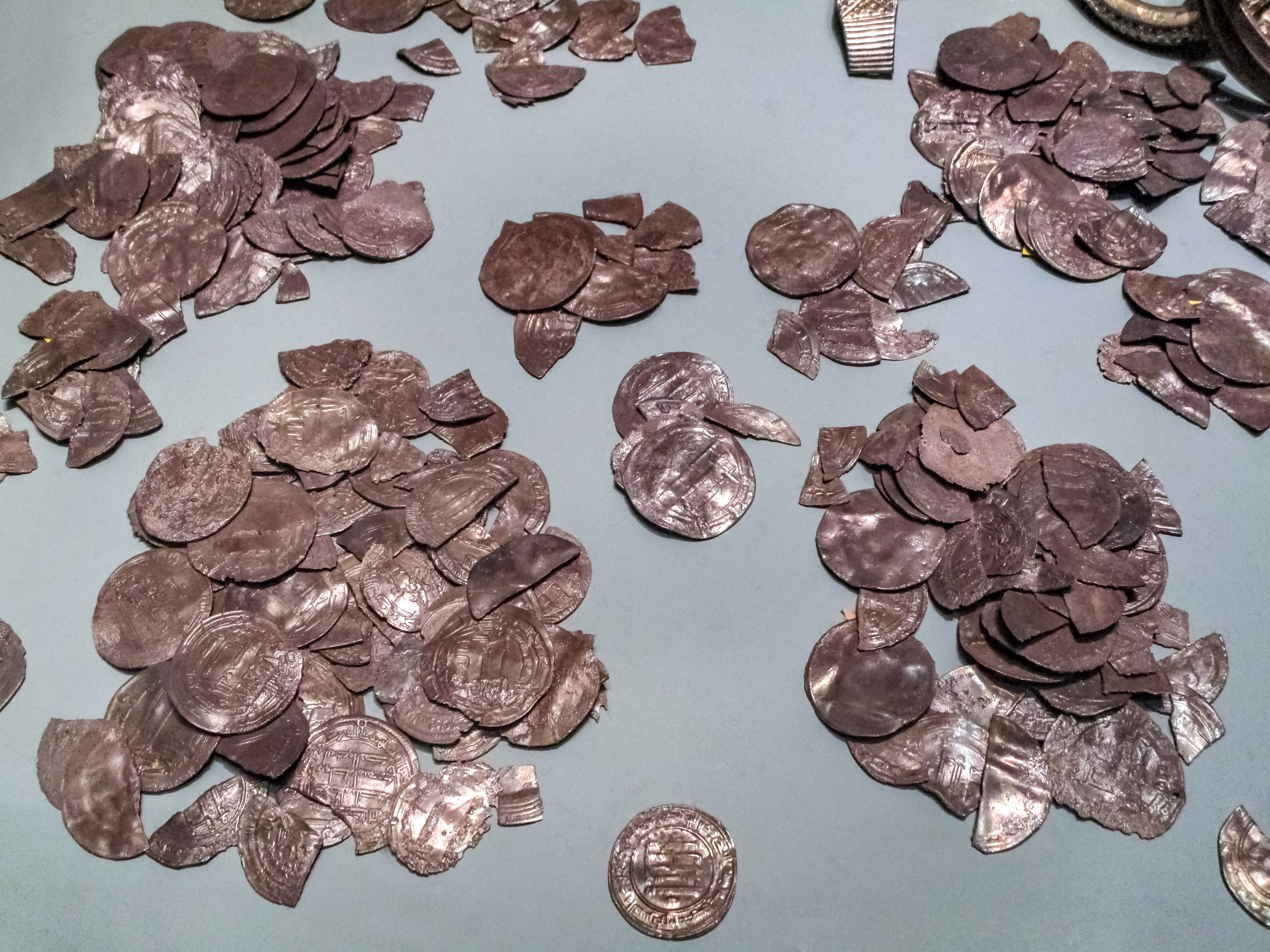
Samanid coins found in the Spillings Hoard.

Bukhara was a capital of the Samanid Empire. During the Samanid Empire, Bukhara was a major center of the slave trade in Central Asia. The Samanid Empire was strategically well situated geographically to function as a key supplier of slaves to the Islamic world, because it lay in a religious border zone between Dar al-Islam (The Muslim world), and Dar al-Harb, the world of non-Muslim infidels, who by Islamic law were a legitimate target for slaves to the Muslim world.

Between 711 and 713, the Umayyad Caliphate defeated the Chach dynasty, the last Hindu dynasty to rule over Sindh, and captured Sindh. Intensifying in the late 10th century, these incursions marked a significant chapter in the history of South Asia, with Ghaznavid forces penetrating deep into the Indian subcontinent, including the Punjab region and northern India. The primary objectives of these campaigns included the acquisition of wealth and slaves, the propagation of Islam, and the establishment of Ghaznavid rule in the region.

Slaves were imported to Bukhara from different non-Muslim lands and via Bukhara to the Muslim world over Persia to the Middle East, and over the Hindu Kush (in present-day Afghanistan) in to India. The situation was similar to other religious border zones in Muslim lands, which were also slave trade centers: such as Al-Andalus in Spain, which were the center of the al-Andalus slave trade; Muslim North Africa, which were the center of the trans-Saharan slave trade and the Red Sea slave trade; as well as Muslim East Africa, which was the center of the Indian Ocean slave trade.

The Samanid slave trade constituted one of the two great suppliers of slaves to the Muslim market in the Abbasid Caliphate; the other being the Khazar slave trade, which supplied it with captured Slavs and tribesmen from the Eurasian northlands. The Samanid slave trade was one of the major routes of European saqaliba-slaves to the Islamic Middle East, alongside the Prague slave trade and the Balkan slave trade.

The Samanid regulated the transit slave trade across their territories, requiring a fee of 70–100 dirhams and a license (jawāz) for each slave boy; the same fee but no license for each slave girl; and a lesser fee, 20–30 dirhams, for each adult woman.

=== Turkic peoples ===
A major source of slaves to the Samanid Empire was the non-Muslim Turkic peoples of Central Asian steppe, which were both bought as well as regularly kidnapped in slave raids by the thousands to supply the Bukhara slave trade.

The slave trade with Turkic people was the biggest slave supply for the Samanid Empire. Until the 13th century, the majority of Turkic peoples were not Muslims but adherents of Tengrism, Buddhism, and various forms of animism and shamanism, which made them infidels and as such legitimate targets for enslavement by Islamic law. Many slaves in the medieval Islamic world referred to as "white" were of Turkic origin.

Muslims conquered Transoxiana between 651 and 751, shortly after their conquest of Persia. From the 7th century onward, when the first Islamic military campaigns were conducted toward Turkic lands in Caucasus and Central Asia, Turkic people were enslaved as war captives and then trafficked as slaves via slave raids via southern Russia and the Caucasus into Azerbaijan, and through Khwarazm and Transoxania into Khorasan and Iran; in 706 the Arab governor Qotayba b. Moslem killed all men in Baykand in Sogdia and took all the women and children as slaves in to the Umayyad Empire and in 676 eighty Turkic nobles captured from the queen of Bukhara were abducted to the governor Saʿīd b. ʿOṯmān of Khorasan to Medina as agricultural slaves, where they killed their slaver and then committed suicide.

The military campaigns were gradually replaced by pure commercial Muslim slave raids against non-Muslim Turks into "infidel territory" (dār al-ḥarb) in the Central Asian steppe, resulting in a steady flow of Turks to the Muslim slave markets of Bukhara, Darband, Samarkand, Kīš, and Nasaf. Aside from slave raids by Muslim slave traders, Turkic captives were also provided to the slave trade as war captives after warfare among the Turkic peoples themselves in the steppes (as was the case of Sebüktigin), and in some cases sold by their own families.

al-Baladhuri described how Caliph al-Mamun used to write to his governors in Khurasan to raid those peoples of Transoxiana who had not submitted to Islam:

"when al-Mutasim became Caliph he did the same to the point that most of his military leaders came from Transoxiana: Soghdians, Farhanians, Ushrusanians, peoples of Shash, and others [even] their kings came to him. Islam spread among those who lived there, so they began raiding the Turks who lived there".

Turkic slaves were the main slave supply of the Samanid slave trade, and regularly formed a part of the land tax sent to the Abbasid capital of Baghdad; the geographer Al-Maqdisi (ca. 375/985) noted that in his time the annual levy (ḵarāj) included 1,020 slaves. The average rate for a Turkic slave in the 9th century was 300 dirhams, but a Turkic slave could be sold for as much as 3,000 dinars.

The trade in Turkic slaves via Bukhara continued for centuries after the end of the Samanid Empire.

=== Indian people ===
Warfare and tax revenue policies was the cause of enslavement of Hindu Indians for the Central Asian slave market already during the Umayyad conquest of Sindh in the 8th century, when the armies of the Umayyad commander Muhammad bin Qasim enslaved tens of thousands of Indian civilians and soldiers as well.

During the Ghaznavid campaigns in India in the 11th century, hundreds of thousands of Indians were captured and sold on the Central Asian slave markets; in 1014 "the army of Islam brought to Ghazna about 200,000 captives (qarib do sit hazar banda), and much wealth, so that the capital appeared like an Indian city, no soldier of the camp being without wealth, or without many slaves", and during the expedition of the Ghaznavid ruler Sultan Ibrahim to the Multan area of northwestern India 100,000 captives were brought back to Central Asia, and the Ghaznavids were said to have captured "500,000 thousand slaves, beautiful men and women". During his twelfth expedition into India in 1018–1019, the armies of Mahmud of Ghazni captured so many Indian slaves that the prices fell and according to al-'Utbi, "merchants came from distant cities to purchase them, so that the countries of Ma wara an-nahr (Central Asia), 'Iraq and Khurasan were filled with them, and the fair and the dark, the rich and the poor, mingled in one common slavery".

=== Viking slave trade ===
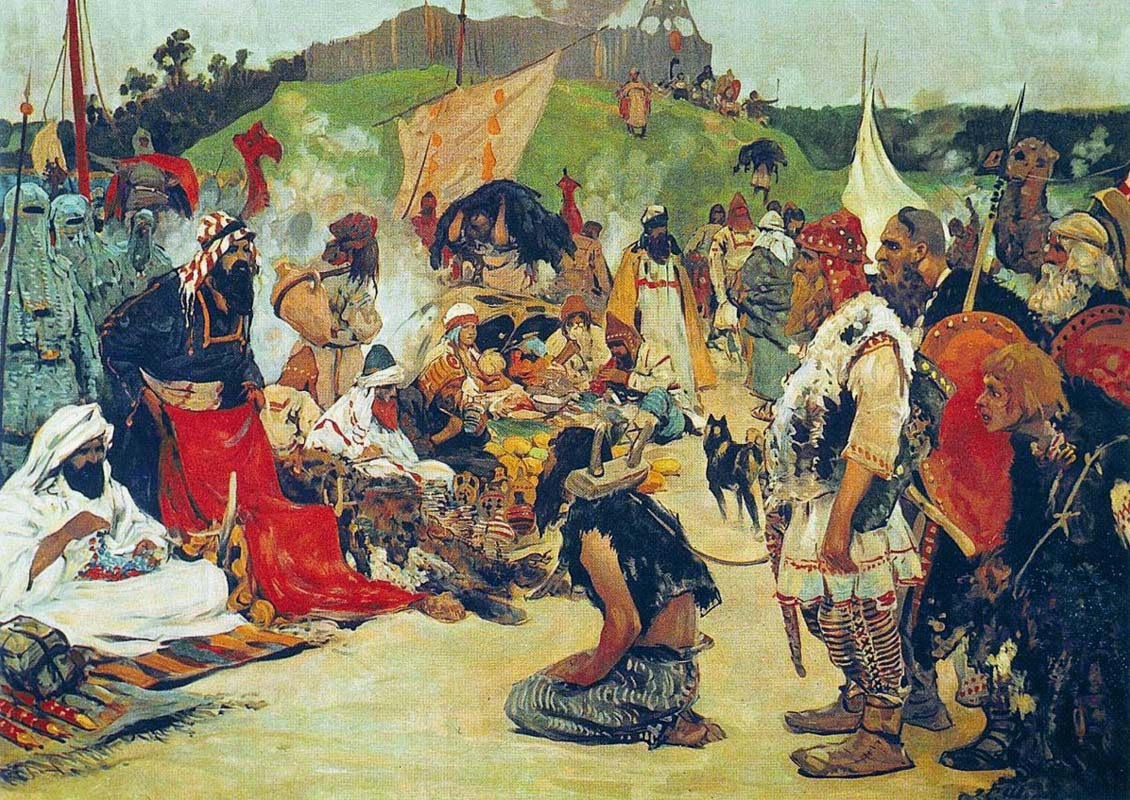
Trade negotiations in the country of Eastern Slavs. Pictures of Russian history. (1909). Vikings sold people they captured in Europe to Muslim merchants in present-day Russia.

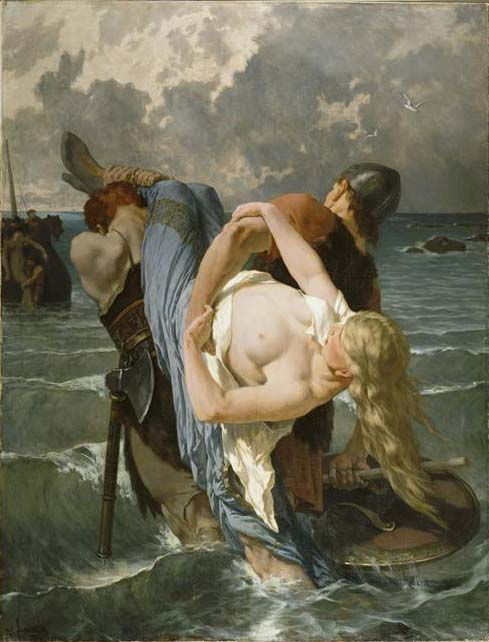
Vikings captured people during their raids in Europe.

The Samanid Empire had important trade contacts with Scandinavia and the Baltics, where many Samanid coins have been found. During the Early Middle Ages, the Samanid Empire was one of the two major destinations of the Viking Volga trade route, along which the Vikings exported slaves captured in Europe to the Abbasid Caliphate in the Middle East via the Caspian Sea and the Samanid Empire to Iran (the other route was to the Byzantine Empire and the Mediterranean via Dnieper and the Black Sea slave trade).

During the eighth to tenth centuries, slaves were traded to elite households in Byzantium and the Islamic world via the Dnieper and Volga river systems, the Carolingian Empire and Venice.

Islamic law prohibited Muslims from enslaving other Muslims, and there was thus a large demand for non-Muslim slaves in Islamic territory. The Vikings sold both Christian and Pagan European captives to the Muslims, who referred to them as saqaliba; these slaves were likely both pagan Slavic, Finnic, and Baltic Eastern Europeans as well as Christian Europeans.

People taken captive during by Vikings could be sold to Moorish Spain via the Dublin slave trade or transported to Hedeby or Brännö in Scandinavia and from there via the Volga trade route to present-day Russia, where slaves and furs were sold to Muslim merchants in exchange for Arab silver dirham and silk, which have been found in Birka, Wolin, and Dublin; initially this trade route between Europe and the Abbasid Caliphate passed via the Khazar Kaghanate, but from the early 10th century onward it went via Volga Bulgaria and from there by caravan to Khwarazm, to the Samanid slave market in Central Asia and finally via Iran to the Abbasid Caliphate. Also Slavic Pagans were captured and enslaved by Vikings, Madjars, Khazars and Volga Bulgars, who transported them to Volga Bulgaria, where they were sold to Muslim slave traders and continued to Khwarazm and the Samanids, with a minor part being exported to the Byzantine Empire. This was a major trade; the Samanids were the main source of Arab silver to Europe via this route, and Ibn Fadlan referred to the ruler of the Volga Bulgar as "King of the Saqaliba" because of his importance for this trade.

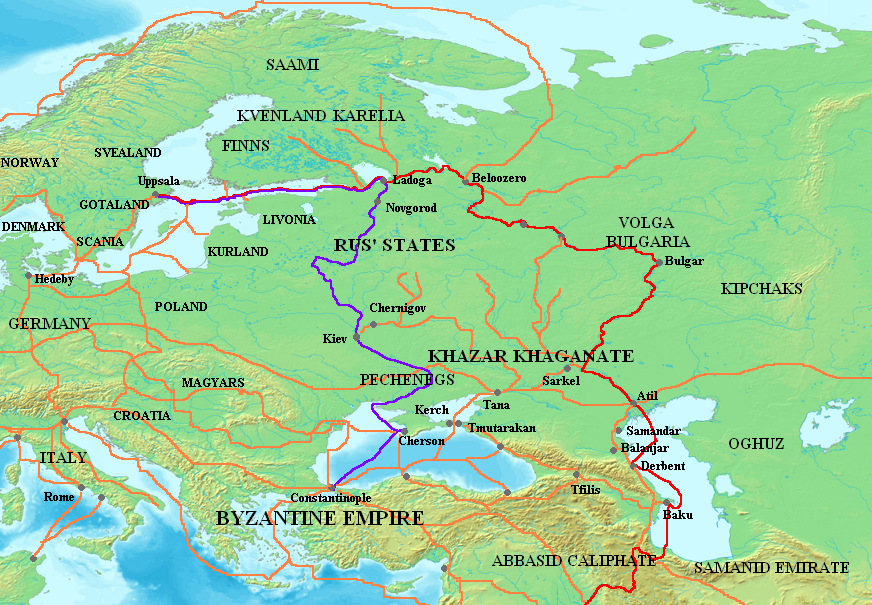
Map showing the major Varangian trade routes: the Volga trade route (in red) and the Trade Route from the Varangians to the Greeks (in purple). Other trade routes of the eighth-eleventh centuries shown in orange.

The slave trade between the Vikings and the Muslims in Central Asia are known to have functioned from at least between 786 and 1009, as big quantities of silver coins from the Samanid Empire has been found in Scandinavia from these years, and people taken captive by the Vikings during their raids all across Europe were likely sold in Islamic Central Asia, a slave trade which was so lucrative that it might have contributed to the Viking raids in all across Europe, used by the Vikings as a slave supply source for their slave trade with Islamic world.

The slave trade between the Vikings and Bukhara via present-day Russia ended when the Vikings converted to Christianity in the 11th century. However, Eastern Europeans were still exported to the slave trade in Central Asia. During the warfare between the Russian principalities in the 12th century, Russian princes allowed their Cuman (Kipchak) allies to enslave peasants from the territory of opposing Russian principalities, and sell them to slave traders in Central Asia.

=== Slave market ===
The slaves were both sold at the Bukhara slave market for domestic use in the Samanid Empire, as well as sold to slave traders and exported to other lands in the Middle East, particularly to the Abbasid Caliphate.

The slave market in the Muslim world prioritized women for the use of domestic servants and concubines (sex slaves) and men as eunuchs, laborers and slave soldiers.

In the sexual slave market, light skinned girls were considered more exclusive for slave concubinage in the harems of the Muslim world than African women from the trans-Saharan and the Red Sea slave trade, and European women were popular, but Turkic girls were a more common ethnicity.

Turkic male slaves were considered supremely suitable as slave soldiers for their background in the hard life style of the steppe, a stereotype al-Jahiz described in his Resāla fī manāqeb al-Tork wa ʿāmmat jond al-ḵelāfa ("epistle on the excellences of the Turks"), who were characterized as loyal and having a "single-minded devotion to their masters", being slaves and as such without any loyalty to their own families. Turkic men were particularly preferred to supply the Abbasid Army of ghilman slave soldiers in Baghdad. Mamluk soldiers were introduced in Yemen during the Ziyadid dynasty (818–981), and Turkic slave soldiers were to become a popular ethnicity from the beginning, eventually the preferred choice of ethnicity for this slave category.

In addition to slave soldiers, Turkic male slaves were also popular as palace slaves, and Turkic slaves served as cupbearers to rulers such as the Sultan Mahmud of Ghazni, whose Turkic cupbearer and favorite Ayāz b. Aymaq played a political role at the Ghaznavid court.

The slave trade was the main trade income of the Samanid Empire, and alongside agriculture and other trade, the slave trade was the economic base of the state.

== Chagatai Khanate and Timurid Empire (13th–15th centuries) ==
By the time of the Mongol campaigns in Central Asia, Bukhara belonged to the Khwarazmian Empire. The city was a still flourishing as a commercial center of the slave trade in Central Asia. During the Mongol invasion of the Khwarazmian Empire, Bukhara was pillaged after the Siege of Bukhara in February 1220. After the conquest of the Mongol Empire, Bukhara belonged to the Chagatai Khanate (1266–1347) and then the Timurid Empire (1370–1501).

=== Slave trade ===
Bukhara was rebuilt after have been pillaged by the Mongols in 1220. Having been a major center of slave trade in Central Asia for centuries, Bukhara was integrated in the extensive network of the slave trade of the Mongol Empire. The Mongol Empire conducted a massive international slave trade with captives during the continuous Mongol invasions and conquests, and founded a network of cities to traffic slaves from one end of the Empire to the other. This network functioned to traffic different categories of slaves to slave markets where they were most requested; such as trafficking Muslim slaves to Christian lands and Christian slaves to Muslim lands.

The slave trade network of the Mongol Empire was organized in a route from North China to North India; from North India to the Middle East via Iran and Central Asia; and from Central Asia to Europa via the Steppe of the Kipchak territory between the Caspian Sea and the Black Sea and Caucasus. This slave trade route was connected via a number of cities used to transport slaves to the peripheries of the Empire, consisting of the capitals of the Mongol khanates – with the capital of Qaraqorum as the main center – and already existing slave trade centers, notably the old slave trade center of Bukhara.

The slave trade was fed by raids and purchase by slave traders; by tributary system in which subjugated states were forced to give slaves as tributes; and by war captives during the warfare campaigns during the Mongal Empire and its succeeding khanates. During Timur's sack of Delhi, for example, thousands of skilled artisans were enslaved and trafficked to Central Asia and gifted by Timur to his subordinate elite.

=== Chinese slaves ===
A major source of slaves for Bukhara during this period was China. During the 13th to 15th centuries, particularly under the Mongol conquests, very large quantities of Chinese were enslaved as war captives and through human tributes imposed by the Mongol Empire.

Before the Mongol invasions, slavery was not widespread in China, where a large free peasant population performed much of the labor. However, the Mongol conquests, especially after the fall of the Jin dynasty (1211–1234), led to a massive influx of Chinese captives who were enslaved and integrated into the empire's extensive slave trade network

The Mongols developed systematic methods for capturing slaves, often selecting a portion of the male and female population from conquered cities for enslavement. Skilled artisans, craftsmen, and concubines were especially valued as slaves. Chinese slaves were exported extensively, both within the empire and abroad, including to Mongolia and Muslim regions. The Mongol Yuan dynasty in China controlled many government-owned slaves used for military, agricultural, and institutional labor.

Chinese slaves during the 13th-15th centuries, particularly under Mongol rule, were exploited in various capacities reflecting their skills and the needs of their owners. Many were forced into labor-intensive roles such as agricultural work, public construction projects, and military servitude. Skilled Chinese artisans, craftsmen, and specialists were often compelled to serve in workshops or as personal retainers to Mongol elites, leveraging their expertise for the empire's benefit. Others were used as domestic servants, concubines, or eunuchs within the Mongol imperial household.

=== Indian slaves ===
During the Delhi Sultanate (1206–1526), Hindus were enslaved in such large quantities for export to the Central Asian slave market that Indian slaves became low price slaves, available and affordable, and increased their demand in international markets. Aside from war captives enslaved during that period, the Delhi Sultanate was provided with large numbers of Hindu slaves via their revenue system, in which the subordinate iqta'dars ordered their armies to abduct Hindus in large numbers as a means of extracting revenue. Taxes were often extracted from communities less loyal to the Sultan in the form of slaves, and non-Muslims who were not able to pay taxes could be defined as resisting the authority of the Sultan and thus abducted as slaves in warfare; Sultan 'Ala al-Din Khalji (r. 1296–1316) legalized the enslavement of non-Muslims who defaulted on their revenue payments.

=== Slave market ===
The slave market of Bukhara continued as a major center of export of slaves to the Muslim world. The Middle East continued to have a big market for the slave categories of girls for sexual slavery and boys for eunuchs and military slavery.

The supply of Turkic slaves started to gradually reduce from the early 14th century onward in parallel with the growing conversion of Turkic peoples to Islam, which protected them from enslavement by Muslims. However, the demand for Turkic slaves were still high.

Turkic girls continued to be a popular target for sexual slavery as concubines; Shajar al-Durr was likely originally a Turkic slave concubine.

Turkic male slaves kept being viewed as the ideal race for military slavery, though many or most Turks were exploited for other forms of labour, including domestic service, as cup bearers, hard labour, etc. Turkic men were popular as slave soldiers (mamluks) in the slave market of the Delhi Sultanate (1206–1526) and the Rasulid dynasty of Yemen (1229–1454). The majority of the slave soldiers of the Bahri Mamluks in the Mamluk Sultanate were of Turkic origin.

A Bukhara endowment deed from 1326, for example, named nineteen slaves of several ethnicities: Mongolian, Indian, Chinese (Khitai) and Russian.

Kitan slaves from North China were popular slaves for the Muslim slave market in prior to the Mongol conquest, and were reputed for their beauty in Central Asia in Iran.

In the domestic market in Central Asia, slaves were used in private households, to maintain the garden, and to cultivate the land and managed the livestock on the plantations of Central Asia's wealthy families; they were used for military slaves, as laborers to maintain irrigation canals, in brick factories, and trained to work in construction engineering. Private individuals could own hundreds of slaves: one Juybari Sheikh (a Naqshbandi Sufi leader) owned over 500 slaves, forty of them pottery producers, and others agricultural laborers, tending livestock, and carpenters. Indian slaves were particularly appreciated as skilled artisans because of the advanced Indian textile industry, agricultural production and architecture. A particular category were sex slavery, and attractive slave girls were sold for a higher price than artisans skilled at construction engineering.

== Khanate and Emirate of Bukhara (16th–19th centuries) ==
The slave trade in Khiva and Bukhara was described by the English traveler Anthony Jenkinson in the mid-16th century, at a time when they were major global slave trade centers and the "slave capitals of the world".

In the 19th century, the Khivean slave trade became bigger than the Bukhara slave trade, but both maintained many similarities. Turkmen tribal groups performed regular slave raids, referred to as alaman, toward two sources of slaves; Russian and German settlers along the Ural, and Persian pilgrims to Mashad, two categories who as Christians and Shia-Muslims respectively were seen as religiously legitimate to target for enslavement.

=== Persians ===
In the 16th century, most slaves trafficked via Khiva and Bukhara were either Persians or Russians. About 100,000 slaves were sold in the slave market of Khiva and Bukhara every year, most of them Persians or Russians. While Islam banned Muslims from enslaving other Muslims, the Persians were Shia Muslims while Khiva and Bukhara were Sunni Muslims, and were therefore seen as legitimate targets for slavery.

This trade was primarily driven by Turkmen and Kazakh raiders, who frequently attacked Persian villages and caravans, especially in the northeastern provinces of Iran such as Khorasan and Astarabad. These raids resulted in the abduction of tens of thousands of Persian villagers, travelers, and townspeople, who were then transported across the desert to be sold as slaves.

The slave markets of Khiva and Bukhara became notorious centers for this trade. By the 17th century, Khiva had developed a large-scale slave market, and during the first half of the 19th century, it is estimated that about one million Persians were enslaved and transported to Central Asian khanates, alongside an unknown number of Russians and others. The slave trade was a major economic and social institution in these khanates, with Persian slaves constituting a significant proportion of the population in places like Bukhara. Persian women were especially prized for harems, while men were often exploited for labor .

The Persian government was largely unable to stop these raids and abductions, lacking the military capacity to counter the highly mobile Turkmen horsemen. Occasional punitive expeditions were launched, but these had little lasting effect. The slave trade in Khiva and Bukhara only began to decline after the Russian conquest of Central Asia in the late 19th century, which brought an end to the open slave markets, though clandestine slavery persisted for some time.

=== Russians ===
Between the 16th and 19th centuries, the enslavement and trade of Russians was a persistent and significant phenomenon in Central Asia, particularly involving the khanates of Khiva and Bukhara. Russian captives were primarily seized during raids on the southern Russian frontier by Crimean Tatars, by the Kazakh raids into Russia, by Bashkirs, Nogais, Turkmen, and other steppe groups. Christian Russian settlers were as non-Muslim seen as legitimate target for enslavement, and abducted from the frontiers by Crimean Tatars, Nogay, Qalmaq, and Bashkir, and transported to the slave markets of Khiva, Balkh, and Bukhara.

Between the 15th and 18th centuries, the Crimean Tatars conducted large-scale slave raids across Eastern Europe, targeting primarily Slavic populations—Russians, Ukrainians, and Poles—as well as other groups in the region. These raids, often supported by the Ottoman Empire and carried out in collaboration with the Nogai Horde, resulted in the abduction of an estimated 2 million people from 1468 to 1694 alone. The practice became known as the "harvesting of the steppe," with raids typically occurring twice a year, during harvest and winter.

The Slavic slaves captured by the Crimean Tatars were exploited primarily as forced labor and domestic servants. After being forcibly taken in brutal raids, many were shackled and marched to Crimea, where they were sold in large slave markets such as Caffa, then trafficked into central Asia for markets like Bukhara. The slaves endured harsh conditions, including physical mutilation and torture to prevent escape or rebellion. They were subjected to grueling labor during the day while confined in prisons or chains at night, surviving on meager, often rotten food. Women, especially the youngest, were frequently exploited for sexual purposes.

=== Indian people ===
A source of slaves were Hindu Indians imported via the Hindu Kush in Afghanistan, who were popular for the domestic market in Bukhara. Alongside Christian Russians, Buddhist Qalmaqs, non-Sunni Afghans and Shia Iranians, Hindu Indians were an important category of slaves in the Central Asian slave trade from the Middle Ages and the early modern era. According to historian Scott Levi, Hindus, who were identified by Muslim jurists as polytheists and therefore kafirs (non-believers), were considered unquestionably legitimate targets for enslavement.

Indian merchants transported Indian slaves to the Central Asian slave market, and enslaved Indians were bought or traded for commodities such as horses by Central Asian slave traders, who transported them to Central Asia via the Hindu Kush by caravan; in 1581 the Portuguese Jesuit missionary Father Antonio Monserrate noted that the "Gaccares" (Gakhar) tribe in Punjab who functioned as mediators in the slave trade between Indian and Central Asia, trading Indian slaves for Central Asian horses to such a degree that they became associated with the proverb, "slaves from India, horses from Parthia". The caravan roads of Central Asia were frequented by bandits who robbed the merchants along the roads, the merchants and their retinue could be not only robbed but themselves taken captive and sold on the slave market.

Indian slaves were also given as gifts between rulers; in the 16th century, for example, four slaves skilled in masonry were given by the Mughal emperor Akbar to 'Abd Allah Khan II of Bukhara. In 1589, the price of a thirty-three-year-old male Indian slave in good health was sold in Samarkand for 225 tanga, and Indians were referred to as "slave-sheep".

=== Slave market ===
In the 16th century, Bukhara exported slaves to Central Asia, the Middle East and India. The Bukhara slave market was a destination for slave merchants from India and other countries of the "East", who came to Bukhara to buy slaves. The slaves were exported from Bukhara to other Islamic khanates in Central Asia.

Bukhara also used slaves for their domestic market. The use of slaves in Bukhara followed the normal model of slavery in the Islamic world. Female slaves were used as domestic servants or as concubines (sex slaves).

Baron Meyendorff reported in the 1820s that a skilled artisan could be sold for about 100 tilla, while an attractive slave girls could be sold for as much as 150 tilla.

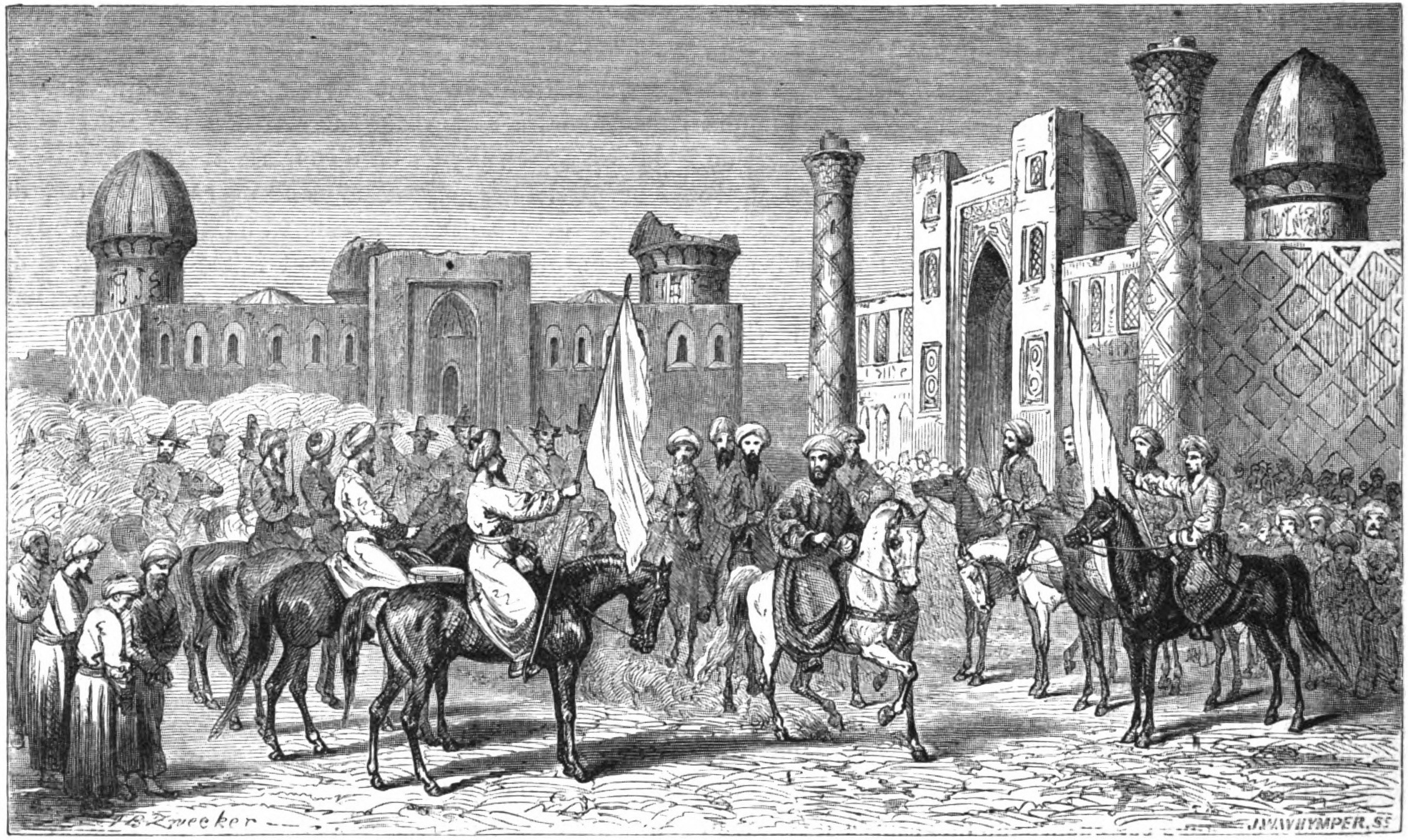
Bukhara, 19th century

Male slaves were used as ghilman slave soldiers. Bukhara also used slave labor in their agriculture, normally Indian slaves.

In the 19th century, the slave markets of Khiva and Bukhara were still among the biggest slave markets in the world. The Turkmen were so known for their slave raids that it was said that Turkmen "would not hesitate to sell into slavery the Prophet himself, did he fall into their hands". The constant raids against travelers constituted a problem for traveling in the region.

Between 20,000 and 40,000 slaves are estimated to have existed in Bukhara in 1821, and around 20,000 in the 1860s.

==== Royal harem ====
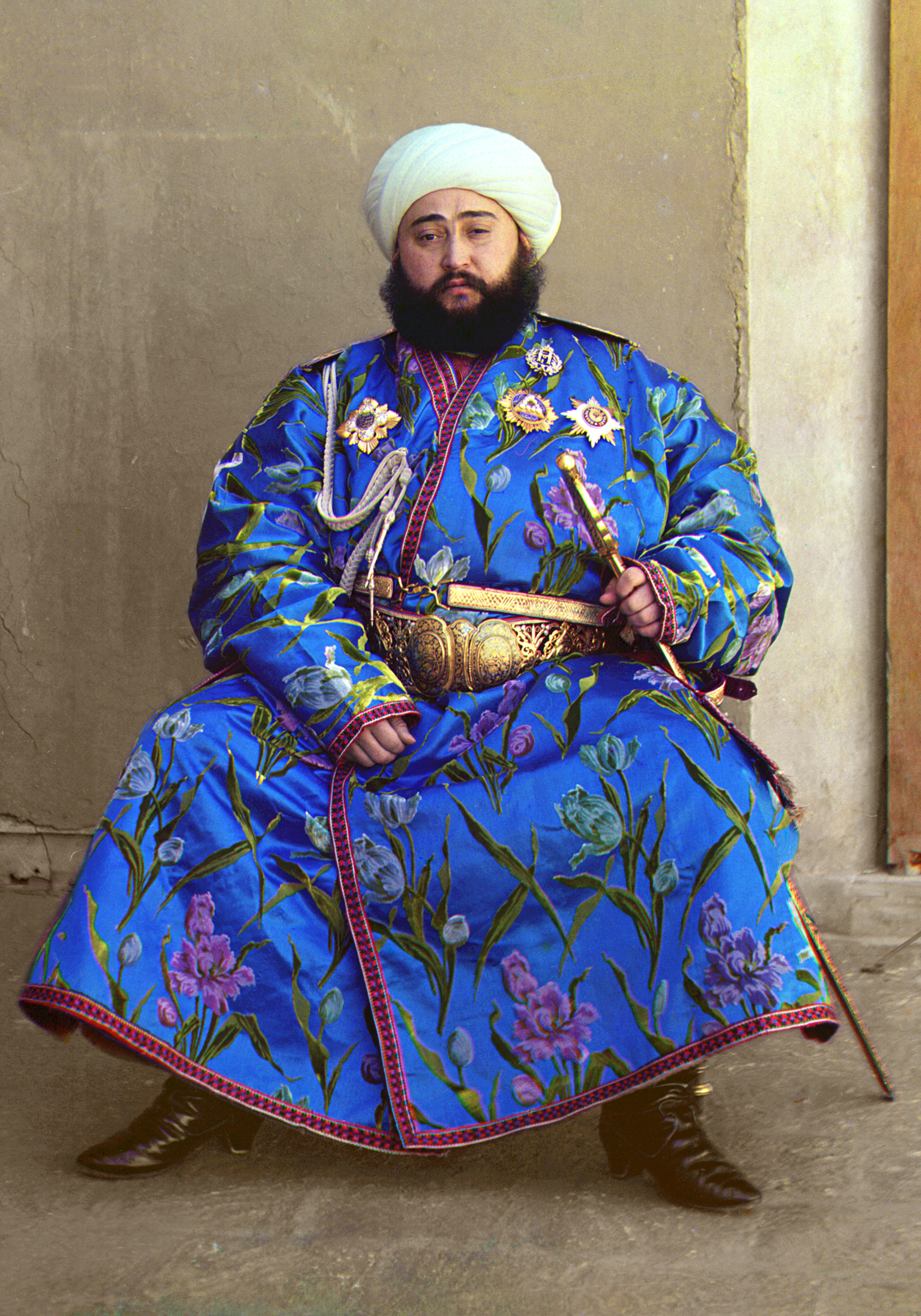
Sayyid Mir Muhammad Alim Khan is known to have staffed his royal harem with slaves until the end of the Emirate in 1920.

The royal harem of the ruler of the Emirate of Bukhara (1785–1920) in Central Asia (Uzbekistan) was similar to that of the Khanate of Khiva. The last Emir of Bukhara was reported to have a harem with 100 women, but also a separate "harem" of "nectarine-complexioned dancing boys". The harem was abolished when the Soviets conquered the area and the khan Sayyid Mir Muhammad Alim Khan was forced to flee; he reportedly left the harem women behind, but did take some of his dancing boys with him.

== Abolition ==
The slave market in Bukhara as well as that in Khiva was banned in 1873 after Russian conquest. However, the process was different. Bukhara became a Russian protectorate after the Russian conquest of Bukhara in 1868. The Russians did not have complete control over Bukhara, where the Emir was still formally in charge. When the slave trade in neighboring Khiva was abolished after the Russian conquest of Khiva in 1873, this put pressure on the Russians to use their power to abolish slavery also in Bukhara. Russia was under pressure by both nationally and internationally Western opinion to abolish slavery and slave trade.

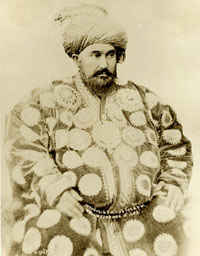
Muzaffar bin Nasrullah abolished the Bukhara slave trade in 1873.

The Russian-Bukharan Treaty of 1873 abolished the Bukhara slave trade. In contrast to neighboring Khiva, slavery as such was not banned in Bukhara after slave trade was banned. The Russian General Governor congratulated Emir Muzaffar bin Nasrullah for having abolished the slave trade in Bukhara, and expressed his hope that also slavery itself would be gradually phased out during a ten-year period.

The Emir promised the Russians that he would abolish slavery in 1883 on condition that the former slaves remained with their slavers until then, after which they would be given the right to buy themselves free; after this promise, the Russians abstained from pressuring the emir more in the issue to avoid damaging their diplomatic contact with him.

=== Aftermath ===
However, despite the official abolition of 1873, the slave trade continued illegally with the blessing of the emir, who himself continued to buy Persian slaves from Turkmen slave traders to staff his harem with slave soldiers and his harem with slave concubines. In 1878, a Russian agent reported that he had witnessed slave trade in Bukhara, and in 1882 the English traveler Henry Lansdell was made aware about the still ongoing slave trade.

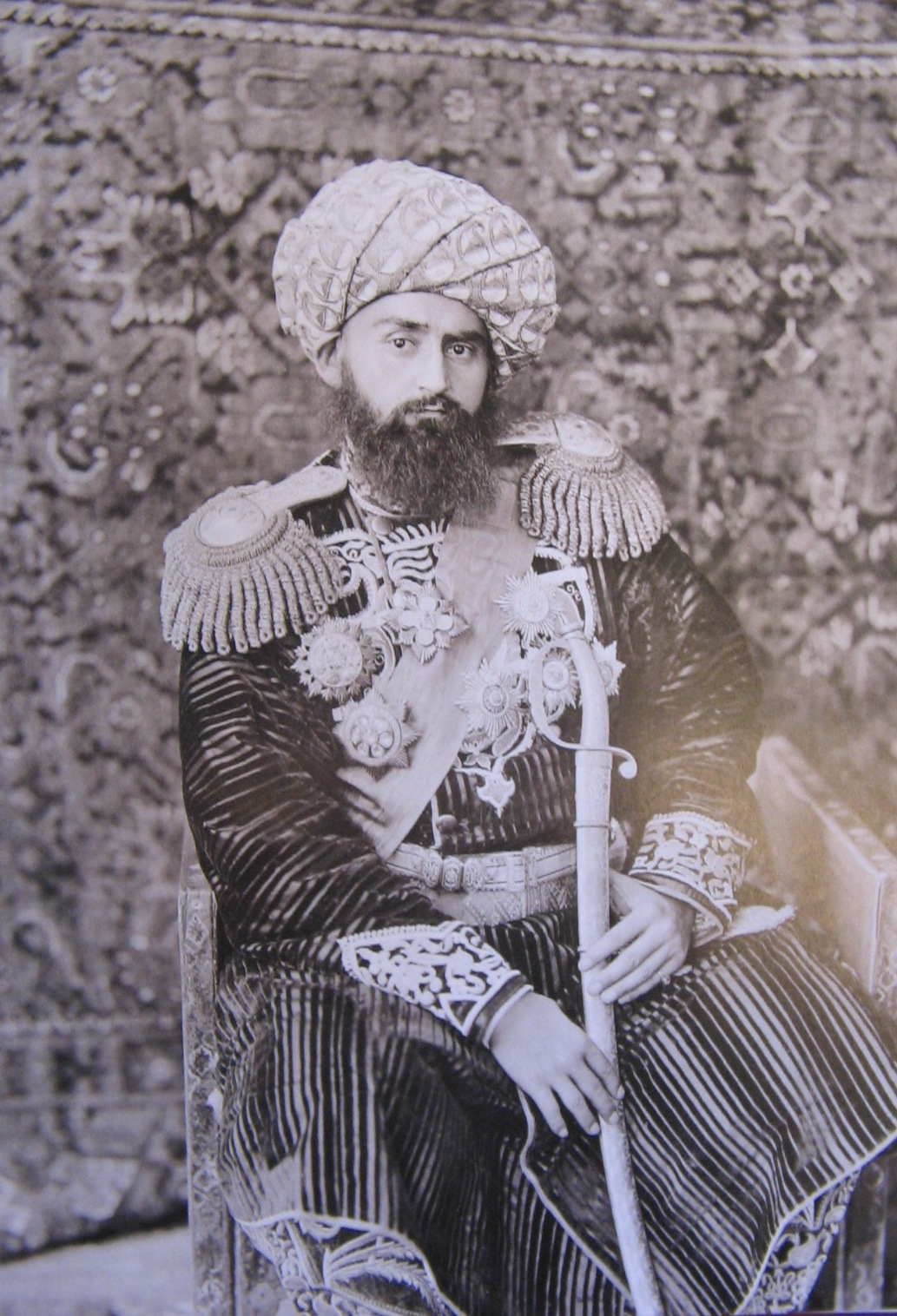
'Abd al-Ahad abolished slavery in Bukhara 1885.

Emir Muzaffar bin Nasrullah did not abolish slavery in 1883 as he had promised the Russians. However his son Emir 'Abd al-Ahad Khan fulfilled his father's promise by officially abolishing slavery in the Emirate of Bukhara. However, slavery in Bukhara continued, and the Royal Household and the Royal Harem continued to be staffed with slaves acquired from Turkmen slave trade agents in secrecy; when the Emirate of Bukhara was annexed by the communist Soviet Union after the Bukharan Revolution and the Bukhara operation (1920), when the last Emir, Sayyid Mir Muhammad Alim Khan, fled from the Red Army and left his slave concubines behind.

== See also ==
- Slavery in Al-Andalus
- Russian conquest of Bukhara
- Slavery in Central Asia
- Crimean slave trade
- Khivan slave trade
- Turkish slaves in the Delhi Sultanate
