= Volga Bulgarian slave trade =

10th-13th century Central Asian trade

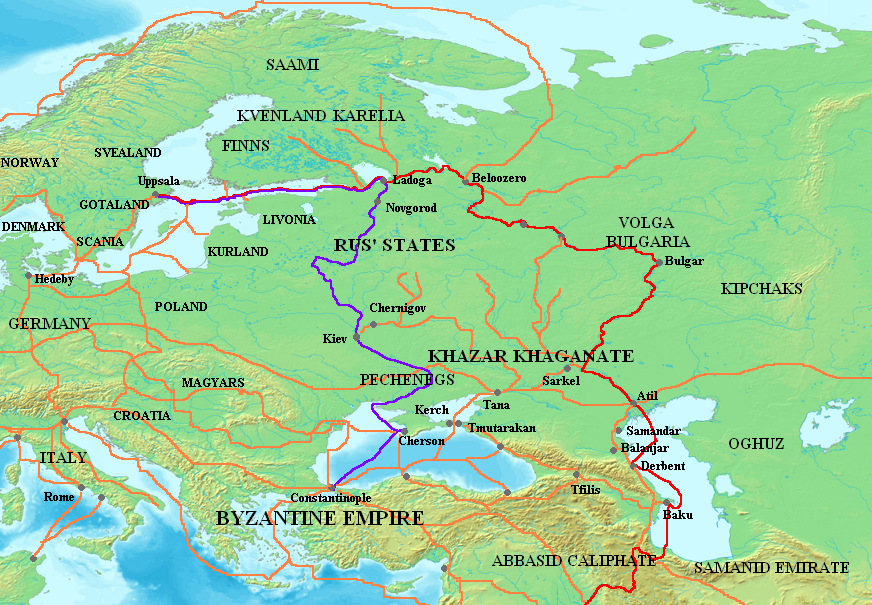
Map showing the major Varangian trade routes: the Volga trade route (in red) and the route from the Varangians to the Greeks (in purple). Other trade routes of the 8th to 11th centuries shown in orange.

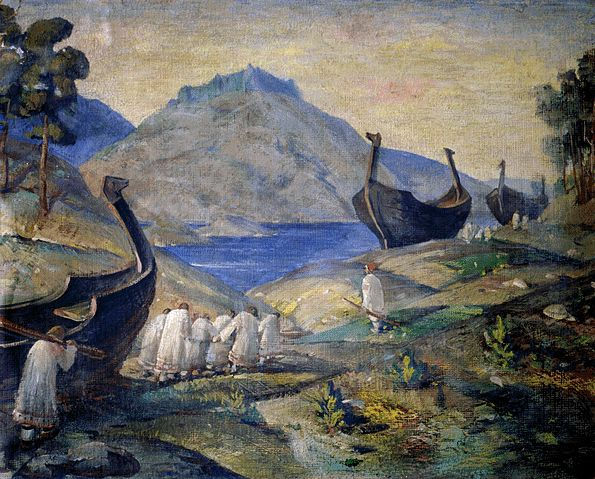
Volok by Roerich

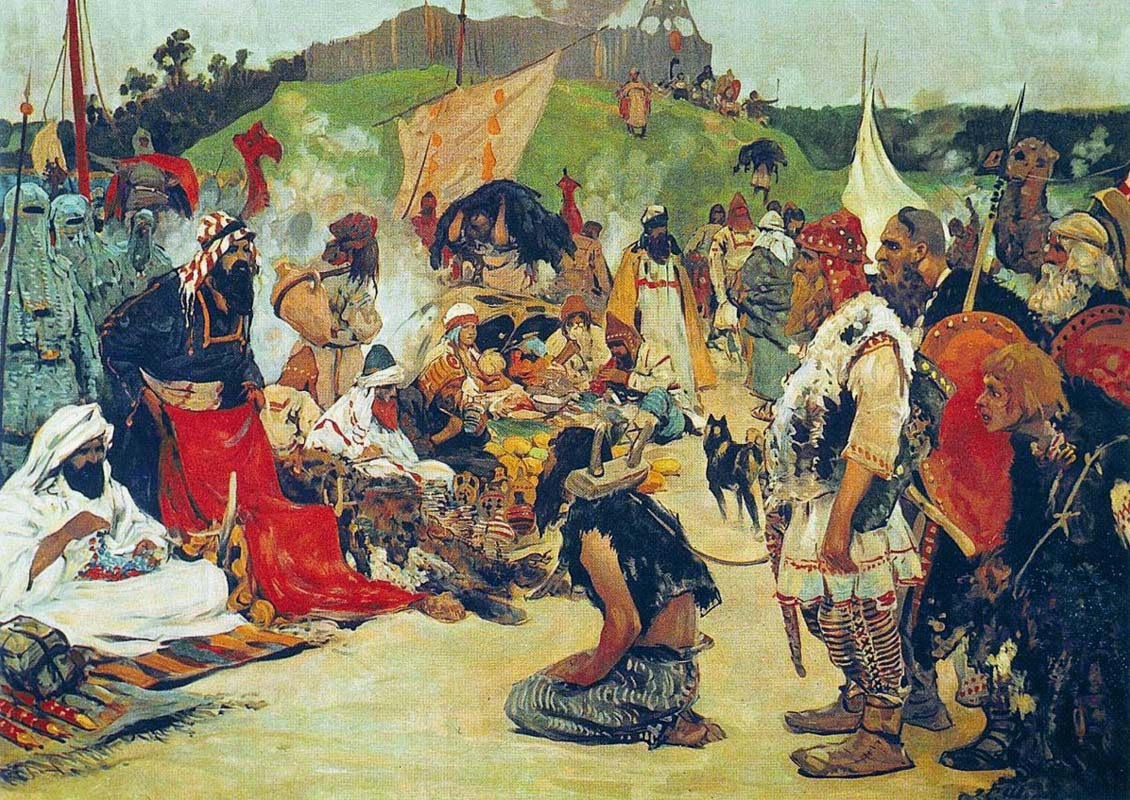
S. V. Ivanov. Trade negotiations in the country of Eastern Slavs. Pictures of Russian history. (1909)

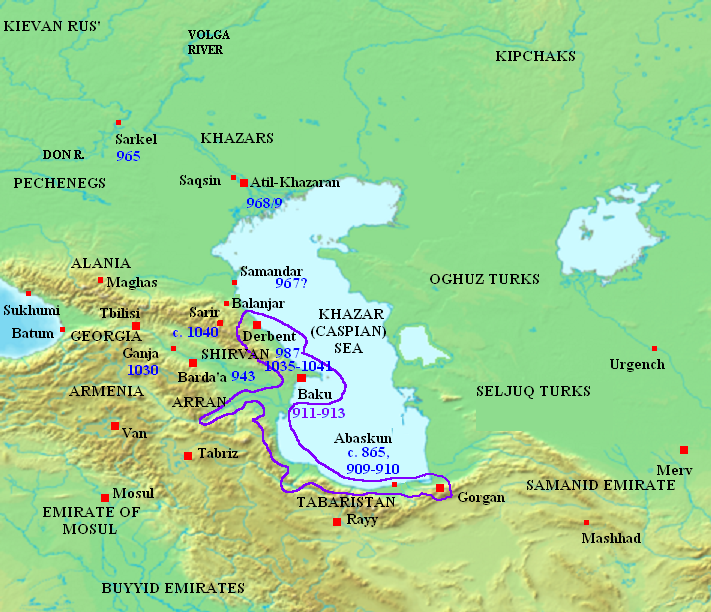
Rus Caspian

The Volga Bulgarian slave trade took place in the Volga Bulgar Emirate in Central Asia (in modern Eastern Russia).

Volga Bulgaria was a buffer state between Europe and the Islamic world and played a major part in the trade between Europe and the Middle East during the Middle Ages from the 10th century onward, and slaves were one of the main goods. The Volga Bulgarian slave trade was one of the major routes of the human trafficking of saqaliba slaves from Europe to the Muslim world from the early 10th century when it replaced the Khazar slave trade. The Viking slave trade in Volga Bulgaria was the subject of a famous description by Ibn Fadlan in the 920s.

== History ==
=== Background ===
In the 9th century, the slave trade of European slaves to the Muslim world were trafficked via the Khazar Khaganate. The flourishing Khazar slave trade was however affected by a crisis in circa 900, and by the early 10th century, the Vikings instead sold their captives to Volga Bulgaria, who exported them by caravan around the Khazar Khaganate to the Abbasid Caliphate via the Samanid slave trade in Central Asia instead, circumventing the Khazar Khaganate.

The Khazar Khaganate initially reacted to this change by making Volga Bulgaria their tributary state in order to continue to profit by the slave trade to the Caliphate, but it resulted in Volga Bulgaria converting to Islam in the 920s and becoming directly aligned with the Caliphate.

The shift of the slave trade to the Caliphate via Volga Bulgaria and the Samanid Empire instead of the Khazar Khaganate is reflected in the fact that from this point on, the Arab silver dirham found in Europe now came from the Samanid Empire rather than directly from the Abbasid Caliphate.

=== Slave trade ===
The Vikings used the demand for slaves in the Southern slave markets in the Orthodox Byzantine Empire and the Islamic Middle Eastern Caliphate, both of whom craved slaves of a different religion than their own. During the Middle Ages, organized alongside religious principles. Both Christians and Muslims banned the enslavement of people of their own faith, but both approved of the enslavement of people of a different faith; both did allow the enslavement of people they regarded to be heretics, which allowed Catholic Christians to enslave Orthodox Christians, and Sunni Muslims to enslave Shia Muslims.

Volga Bulgaria played a key role in the Viking trade route in the 10th and 11th centuries. People taken captive during the Viking raids across Eastern Europe could be sold to Moorish Spain or transported to Hedeby or Brännö and from there via the Volga trade route to present-day Russia, where Slavic slaves and furs were sold to Muslim merchants in exchange for Arab silver dirham and silk, which have been found in Birka, Wolin, and Dublin; initially this trade route between Europe and the Abbasid Caliphate passed via the Khazar Kaghanate, but from the early 10th-century onward it went via Volga Bulgaria.

The slave trade between the Vikings and Bukhara via Volga Bulgaria ended when the Vikings converted to Christianity in the 11th century. However, East Europeans were still exported to the slave trade in Central Asia. During the warfare between the Russian principalities in the 12th century, Russian princes allowed their Cuman (Kipchak) allies to enslave peasants from the territory of opposing Russian principalities, and sell them to slave traders in Central Asia.

The Volga Bulgarians did not only buy slaves from other people, but also conducted their own slave raids to supply slaves for their slave trade. To perform slave raids was a common practice among the Nomadic people of the Central Asian Steppe, and the Volga Bulgarians conducted slave raids toward neighboring peoples, particularly the Slavic Rus people.

=== Slave market ===
The majority of the slaves trafficked to Volga Bulgaria where exported to slavery in the Abbasid Caliphate, but there was also a slave market for domestic use in Bolghar. The Slavic slaves in Bolghar in Volga Bulgaria were assigned to live in specific slave quarters of the city, with their own judges. Ibn Fadlan described slavery in Volga Bulgaria:

"Russians are a separate tribe, their land borders the lands of Turks and Sakaliba. They are sold as slaves to Bulgars and Khazars, and also trade slaves. [...] In the Bulgar cities, since the time of [pre-Islamic] ignorance, there lived people of various origins. Among them, there where Sakaliba and Russians. They usually lived in one particular part of the city. [...] The Sakaliba we speak of here are heathen people who serve as slaves and warriors to the King [of the Bulgars]."

The majority of the slaves imported to Volga Bulgaria were however intended for export. They were transported from southeastern Volga Bulgaria by caravan to Khwarazm, to the Samanid slave market in Central Asia and finally via Iran to the Abbasid Caliphate.

=== End of the slave trade ===
The Vikings stopped their slave raiding when they converted to Christianity in the 11th century, which ended their role as slave suppliers to Volga Bulgaria. This did weaken the slave trade, but did not eradicate it. There was still a market for saqaliba slaves in the Abbasid Caliphate, and Slavs from Kievan Rus' were still captured in raids and sold via Volga Bulgaria, as well as other non-Muslim people around Volga Bulgaria.

The Volga Bulgarian slave trade and its connection with the slave trade via Bukhara to the Caliphate continued to the Mongol invasions of the 13th century. Volga Bulgaria was crushed by the Mongol invasion of Volga Bulgaria in 1236–1237.

== See also ==
- Prague slave trade
- Kievan Rus' slave trade
