= Volga trade route =

Historical trade route that connected Northern Europe with the Caspian Sea

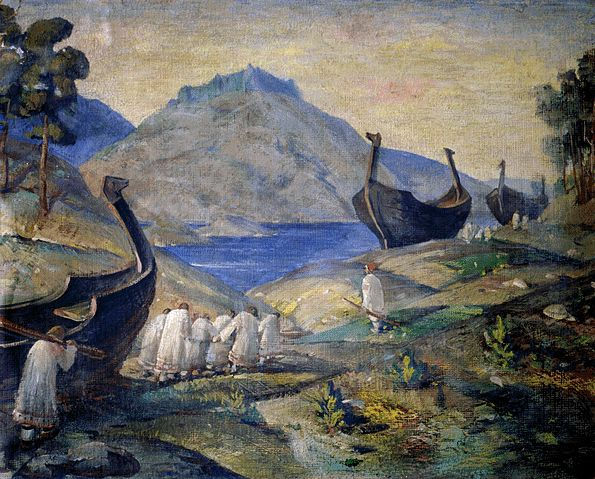
Nicholas Roerich: Through a Portage (1915)

In the Middle Ages, the Volga trade route connected Northern Europe and Northwestern Russia with the Caspian Sea and the Sasanian Empire, via the Volga River. The Rus used this route to trade with Muslim countries on the southern shores of the Caspian Sea, sometimes penetrating as far as Baghdad. The powerful Volga Bulgars (cousins of today's Balkan Bulgarians) formed a seminomadic confederation and traded through the Volga river with Viking people of Rus' and Scandinavia (Swedes, Danes, Norwegians) and with the southern Byzantine Empire (Eastern Roman Empire) Furthermore, Volga Bulgaria, with its two cities Bulgar and Suvar east of what is today Moscow, traded with Russians and the fur-selling Ugrians. Chess was introduced to Medieval Rus via the Caspian-Volga trade routes from Persia and Arabia.

There was a second route from the Baltic Sea to the Dnieper, which ran along the Western Dvina (Daugava) between Lovat and Dnieper in the Smolensk region and along the Kasplya River to Gnezdovo. The Volga trade route functioned concurrently with the Dnieper trade route, better known as the trade route from the Varangians to the Greeks, and lost its importance in the 11th century.

== Establishment ==
The Volga trade route was established by the Varangians who settled in Northwestern Russia in the early 9th century. About 10 km (6 mi) south of the Volkhov River entry into Lake Ladoga, they established a settlement called Ladoga (Old Norse: Aldeigjuborg). Archaeological evidence suggests Rus trading activities along the Volga trade route as early as the end of the 8th century. The earliest and the richest finds of Arabic coins in Europe were discovered on the territory of present-day Russia, particularly along the Volga, at Timerevo in the district of Yaroslavl. A hoard of coins found at Petergof, near Saint Petersburg, contains twenty coins with graffiti in Arabic, Khazar runic, Greek, and Old Norse runic, the latter accounting for more than half of the total. These coins include Sassanid, Arab, and Arabo-Sassanid dirhams, the latest of them dated to 804–805. Having examined major finds of Arabic coins in Eastern Europe, Valentin Yanin conclusively demonstrated that the earliest monetary system of early Russia was based on the early type of dirham minted in Africa. Furthermore, Iranian lusterware was already discovered in the Oka and Upper Volga regions (more precisely, it is spread in Rostov, Yaroslavl, Suzdal, Tver, Moscow and Ryazan). Expensive ceramics were imported to Moscow from the Transcaspian region and Crimea. Fragments of Syrian, Egyptian and Mesopotamian vessels have been found in Novgorod.

== Functioning ==
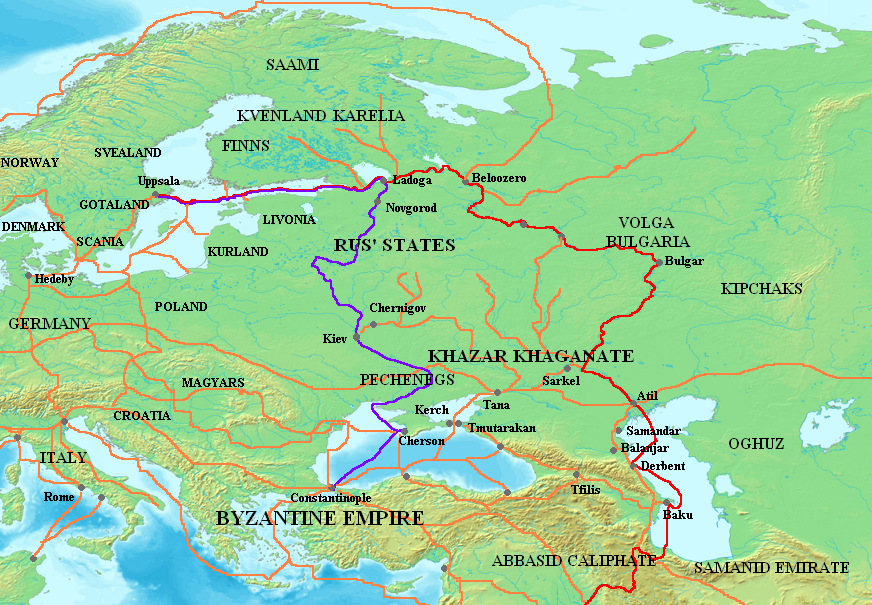
Map showing the major Varangian trade routes: the Volga trade route (in red) and the route from the Varangians to the Greeks (in purple). Other trade routes of the eighth-eleventh centuries shown in orange.

From Aldeigjuborg, the Rus could travel up the Volkhov River to Novgorod, then to Lake Ilmen and further along the Lovat River. Taking their boats around 3 kilometers over a portage, they reached the sources of Volga. The traders brought furs, honey, and slaves through territory held by Finnic and Permian tribes down to the land of the Volga Bulgars. From there, they continued by way of the Volga, to the Khazar Khaganate, whose capital Atil was a busy entrepot on the shore of the Caspian Sea. From Atil, the Rus merchants traveled across the sea to join the caravan routes leading to Baghdad. In 9th and 10th centuries the river was also a major trade route between Russians, Khazars and Volga Bulgars. Furthermore, the Volga connected merchants from Volga Bulgaria with people from Scandinavia and the southern Byzantine Empire, as well with Russians and Ugrians.

Many experts believe that the Volga trade route provided the Vikings with valuable crucible steel from the Middle East.

Around 885–886, ibn Khordadbeh wrote about the Rus merchants who brought goods from Northern Europe and Northwestern Russia to Baghdad:

[They] transport beaver hides, the pelts of the black fox and swords from the farthest reaches of the Saqaliba to the Sea of Rum [i.e., the Black Sea]. The ruler of Rum [i.e., the Byzantine Empire] takes a tithe of them. If they wish, they go to the Tnys river [i.e., "Tanais", the Greek name of the Don River], Yitil [i.e., Itil, the ancient name of the Volga], or Tin [variously identified as Don or Seversky Donets], the River of the Saqaliba. They travel to Khamlij, the city of the Khazars whose ruler takes a tithe of them. Then they betake themselves to the Sea of Jurjan [Caspian Sea] and they alight on whichever of its shores they wish. ... Sometimes, they carry their goods from Jurjan by camel to Baghdad. Saqlab slaves translate for them. They claim that they are Christians and pay the jizya.

In ibn Khordadbeh's account, the Rus are described as "a kind of the Saqaliba", a term usually used to refer to Slavs, and anti-Normanist scholars have interpreted this passage as indicative of the Rus being Slavs rather than Scandinavians. In the interpretation of the Normanist scholars, the word Saqaliba was also frequently applied to all fair-haired, ruddy-complexioned population of Central, Eastern, and Northeastern Europe, so ibn Khordadbeh's language is ambiguous here (see Rus' (people) for details of the dispute between Normanists and Antinormanists). The Arabs had only a very vague notion of the ethnic characteristics of the populations with which they were not neighbors. It is likely that the term Saqaliba designated a disparate group of Balkan, Caucasian, Turkic and Slavic peoples living between the Baltic Sea and the Black and Caspian Seas. Ahmad ibn Fadlan, for example, describes Almis, king of the Volga Bulgars, as "king of the Saqaliba", while Al-Biruni calls the Baltic Sea the "sea of the Saqaliba".

Modern scholars have also clashed over the interpretation of ibn Khordadbeh's report that the Rus used Saqlab interpreters. Anti-Normanists construed this passage as evidence that the Rus and their interpreters shared a common Slavic mother tongue. Slavic, however, was a lingua franca in the Eastern Europe at that time.

The Persian geographer ibn Rustah described the Rus communities living along Volga:

They sail their ships to ravage as-Saqaliba [the surrounding Slavs], and bring back captives whom they sell at Khazaran and Bolghar... They have no estates, villages, or fields; their only business is to trade in sable, squirrel, and other furs, and the money they take in these transactions they stow in their belts. Their clothes are clean and the men decorate themselves with gold armlets. They treat their slaves well, and they wear exquisite clothes since they pursue trade with great energy.

In 921–922, ibn Fadlan was a member of a diplomatic delegation sent from Baghdad to Volga Bulgars, and he left an account of his personal observations about the Rus of the Volga region, who dealt in furs and slaves. Johannes Brøndsted interpreted ibn Fadlan's commentary as indicating that these Rus retained their Scandinavian customs regarding weapons, punishments, ship-burials, and religious sacrifices. Ibn Fadlan's account includes a detailed description of the Rus praying and making sacrifices for success in trade:

On anchoring their vessels, each man goes ashore carrying bread, meat, onions, milk, and nabid [possibly, beer], and these he takes to a large wooden stake with a face like that of a human being, surrounded by smaller figures, and behind them tall poles in the ground. Each man prostrates himself before the large post and recites: 'O Lord, I have come from distant parts with so many girls, so many sable furs (and whatever other commodities he is carrying). I now bring you this offering.' He then presents his gift and continues 'Please send me a merchant who has many dinars and dirhems, and who will trade favourably with me without too much bartering.' Then he retires. If, after this, business does not pick up quickly and go well, he returns to the statue to present further gifts. If results continue slow, he then presents gifts to the minor figures and begs their intercession, saying, 'These are our Lord's wives, daughters, and sons.' Then he pleads before each figure in turn, begging them to intercede for him and humbling himself before them. Often trade picks up, and he says 'My Lord has required my needs, and now it is my duty to repay him.' Whereupon he sacrifices goats or cattle, some of which he distributes as alms. The rest he lays before the statues, large and small, and the heads of the beasts he plants upon the poles. After dark, of course, the dogs come and devour the lot -and the successful trader says, 'My Lord is pleased with me, and has eaten my offerings.'

On the other hand, the Rus came under foreign influence in such matters as dead chief's costume and in the habit of overloading of their women with jewelry:

Each woman carries on her bosom a container made of iron, silver, copper, or gold -its size and substance depending on her man's wealth. Attached to the container is a ring carrying her knife which is also tied to her bosom. Round her neck she wears gold or silver rings; when a man amasses 10,000 dirhems he makes his wife one gold ring; when he has 20,000 he makes two; and so the woman gets a new ring for every 10,000 dirhems her husband acquires, and often a woman has many of these rings. Their finest ornaments are green beads made from clay. They will go to any length to get hold of these; for one dirhem they procure one such bead and they string these into necklaces for their women.

== Connection to the slave trade ==
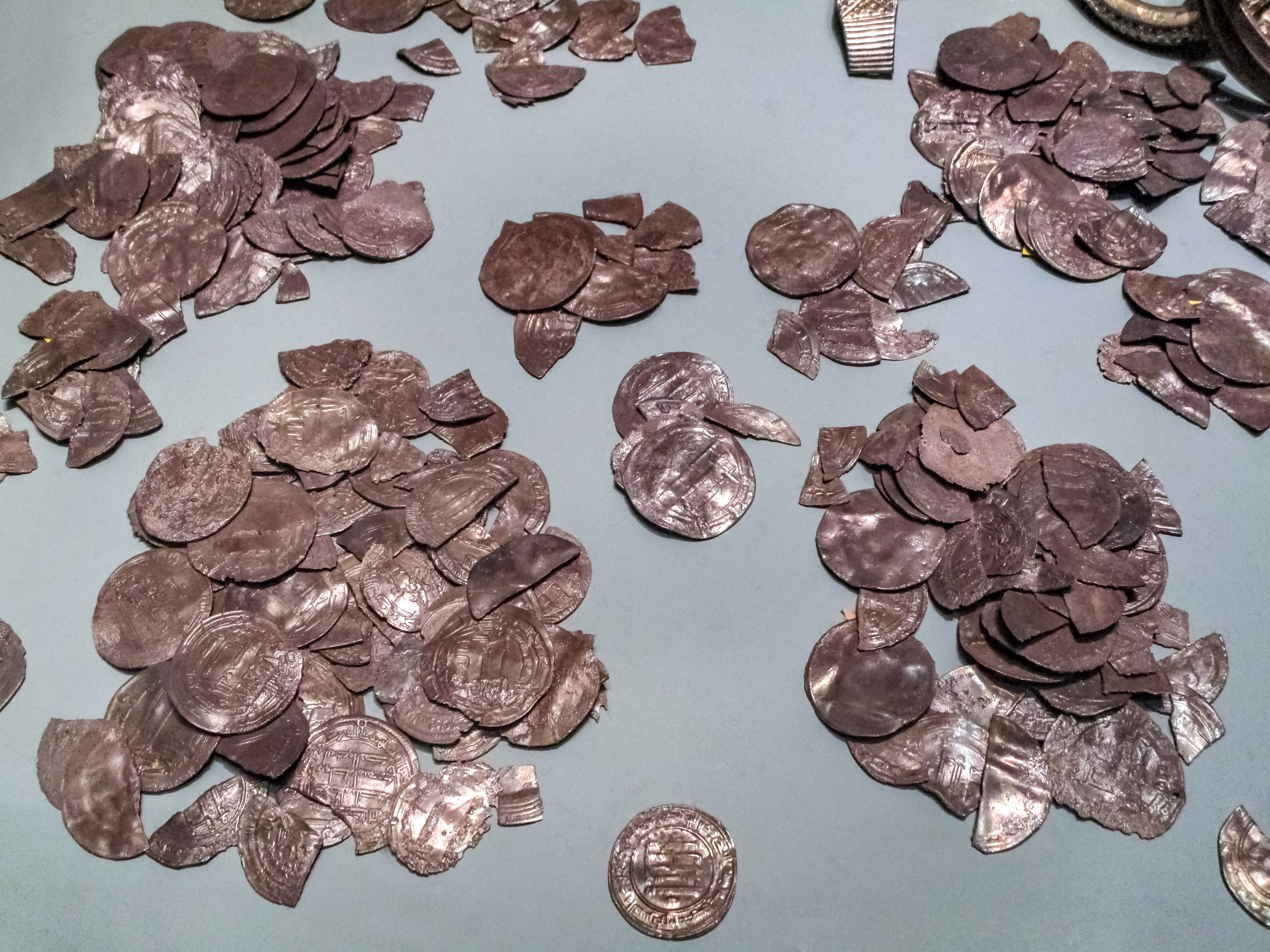
Samanid coins found in the Spillings Hoard.

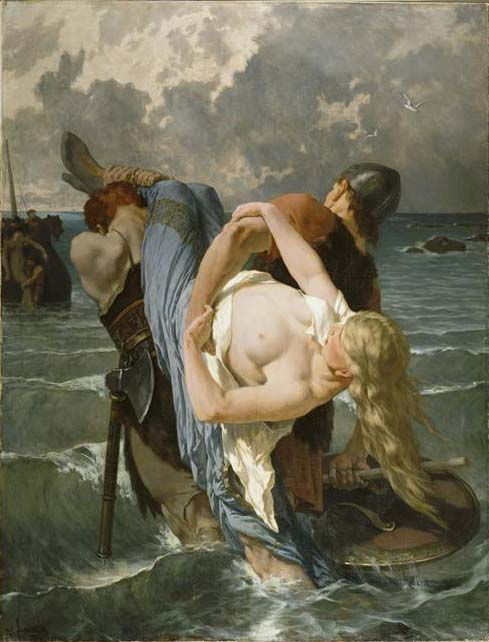
Vikings captured people during their raids in Europe.

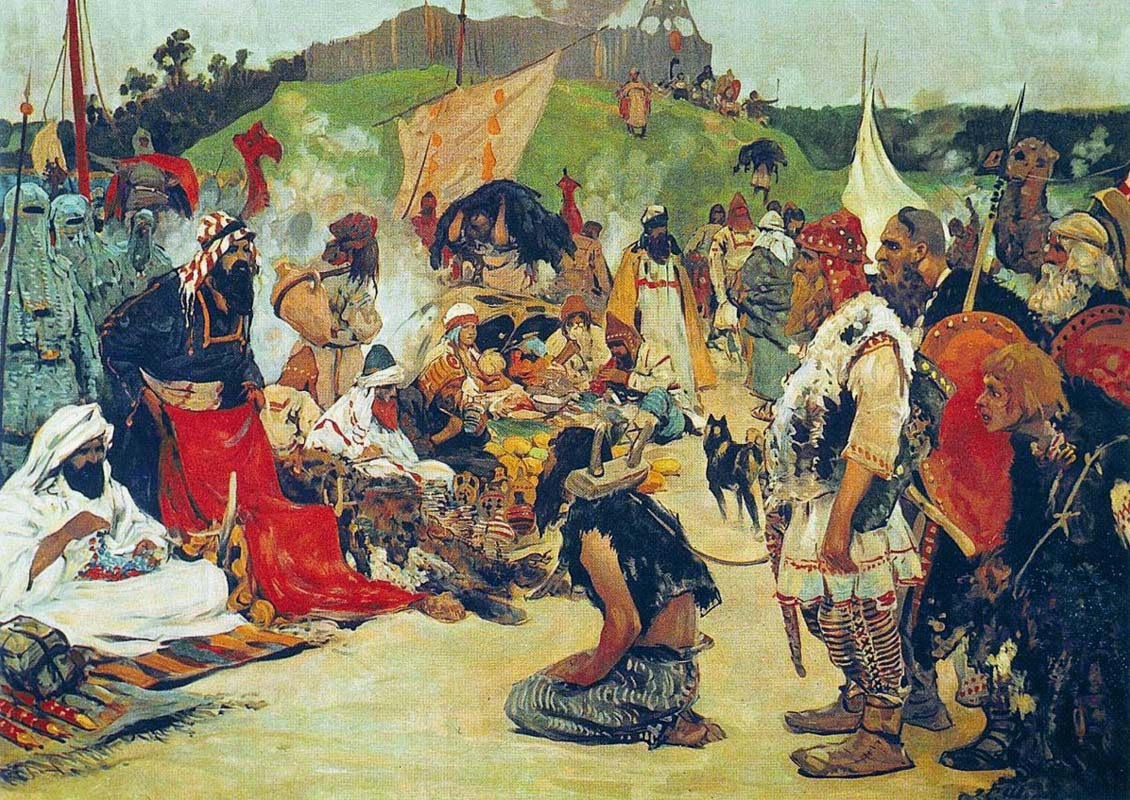
The Rus trading slaves with the Khazars: Trade in the East Slavic Camp by Sergei Ivanov (1909)

During the raids, the Vikings often captured and enslaved militarily weaker peoples they encountered through raids or conquests across Europe. This slave trade lasted from the 8th through the 11th centuries. Slavery was a deeply entrenched institution in Viking society which was hierarchical, and the lowest social class consisted of thralls and slaves, which made up the main source of hard labor in Norse society. The Samanid slave trade in Bukhara constituted one of the two great furnishers of slaves to the Muslim market in the Abbasid Caliphate; the other being the Khazar slave trade.

=== Background ===
Slavery was common in the Viking age period, and one of the main reasons for the Viking expansion was the search for slaves in other countries. One of the reasons Kievan Rus came to be was that Scandinavian settlers established themselves and traded with captured slaves. During the eighth to tenth centuries, slaves from Eastern Europe and the Baltic Sea were traded to elite households in Byzantium and the Islamic world via the Dnieper and Volga river systems, the Carolingian Empire and Venice. Arabic merchants from the Caspian Sea and Byzantine merchants from the Black Sea bought their goods to the trade markets in Rus, where they met the Viking traders and warriors known as Varangians, and traded their goods for the slaves captured by the Vikings in Europe.

The Vikings used the demand for slaves in the Southern slave markets in the Orthodox Byzantine Empire and the Islamic Middle Eastern Caliphate, both of whom craved slaves of a different religion than their own. During the Middle Ages, organized alongside religious principles. Both Christians and Muslims banned the enslavement of people of their own faith, but both approved of the enslavement of people of a different faith; both did allow the enslavement of people they regarded to be heretics, which allowed Catholic Christians to enslave Orthodox Christians, and Sunni Muslims to enslave Shia Muslims. However, both Christians and Muslims approved of enslaving Pagans, who came to be a preferred target of the slave trade in the Middle Ages, and Pagan war captives were sold by Pagan enemies into the slave trade. Pagans from Eastern Europe came to be the most popular targets for slavery in both the Byzantine Empire and the Islamic Arab world during the Early Middle Ages, where they were forced to convert to Christianity and Islam respectively after their enslavement.

=== The Viking slave trade ===
The Vikings trafficked European slaves captured in Viking raids in Eastern Europe in two destinations from present day Russia via the Volga trade route; one to Slavery in the Abbasid Caliphate in the Middle East via the Caspian Sea, the Samanid slave trade and Iran; and one to the Byzantine Empire and the Mediterranean via Dnieper and the Black Sea slave trade. Until the 9th century, the Vikings trafficked European slaves from the Baltic Sea in the North or the North Sea in the West via the Wisla or the Donau rivers South East through Europe to the Black Sea. The Viking slave route was redirected in the 9th century, and until the 11th century the Vikings trafficked European slaves from the Baltic Sea via Ladoga, Novgorod and the Msta river via the Route from the Varangians to the Greeks to the Byzantine Empire via the Black Sea slave trade, or to the Abbasid Caliphate via the Caspian Sea (and the Bukhara slave trade) via the Volga trade route.

The so-called saqaliba, which was the term for white slaves in the Islamic Middle East (often provided by the Vikings), is not likely to stand for exclusively Slavic ethnicity in practice, since many victims of the Vikings' saqaliba slave trade was in fact other ethnicities such as Baltics, Lithuanians, and Finno-Ugric people.

Archbishop Rimbert of Bremen (d. 888) reported that he witnessed a “large throng of captured Christians being hauled away” in the Viking port of Hedeby in Denmark, one of whom was a woman who sang psalms to identify herself as a Christian nun, and who the bishop was able to free by exchanging his horse for her freedom.

People taken captive during the Viking raids across Eastern Europe could be sold to Moorish Spain via the Dublin slave trade or transported to Hedeby or Brännö and from there via the Volga trade route to Russia, where Slavic slaves and furs were sold to Muslim merchants in exchange for Arab silver dirham and silk, which have been found in Birka, Wollin and Dublin; initially this trade route between Europe and the Abbasid Caliphate passed via the Khazar Kaghanate, but from the early 10th-century onward it went via Volga Bulgaria and from there by caravan to Khwarazm, to the Samanid slave market in Central Asia and finally via Iran to the Abbasid Caliphate.

This trade was the source of the Arab dirham silver hoards found in Scandinavia and functioned from at least 786 until 1009, when such coins have been found there, and it would have been so lucrative that it contributed to the continuing Viking raids in Europe, which was used by the Vikings as a slave supply source for this trade with the Islamic world. Among such hoards can be mentioned the Spillings Hoard and the Sundveda Hoard.

One of the only accounts describing Norse slave practices in detail and first person is the Arabic merchant Ibn Fadlan meeting Volga Vikings. Describing Vikings using the Volga trade route using Saqaliba or Slavic slaves as translators when trading. There he describes the Norse ship burials only known in Norse society before the Viking expansion in 800 AD into Russia and Ukraine and that a slave girl was sacrificed to follow her master. Norse burials found in Sweden and Norway indicate that slaves were sacrificed in Sweden to follow their masters to the afterlife. However, Swedish archaeology shows that mostly male slaves were killed to follow their master into the afterlife and not females. Sacrificed female slaves have however been found sacrificed in Norway, where a woman found in the grave showed signs of having her throat slit in a similar manner to the execution described by Ibn Fadlan.

During the 11th century, the Viking nations of Denmark, Norway and Sweden became Christian, which made it infeasible for them to continue to conduct slave raids toward Christian Europe and sell Christian Europeans to Islamic slave traders. The establishment of Kievan Rus likely also decreased the number of slaves taken in raids and limited it to the local market for slaves in Scandinavia, according to Lena Björkman.

== Decline ==
The Volga trade route lost its importance by the 11th century due to the decline of silver output in the Abbasid caliphate, and thus, the trade route from the Varangians to the Greeks, which ran down the Dnieper to the Black Sea and the Byzantine Empire, gained more weight. The Icelandic saga Yngvars saga víðförla describes an expedition of Swedes into the Caspian launched around 1041 from Sweden by Ingvar the Far-Travelled (Ingvar Vittfarne in Norse), who went down the Volga into the land of the Saracens (Serkland). The expedition was unsuccessful, and afterwards, no attempts were made to use the route between the Baltic and Caspian seas by the Scandinavian Norsemen.

== See also ==
- Vyshny Volochyok Waterway
- Black Sea slave trade
- Bukhara slave trade
- Samanid slave trade
- Birka and Hovgården
