= Khazar slave trade =

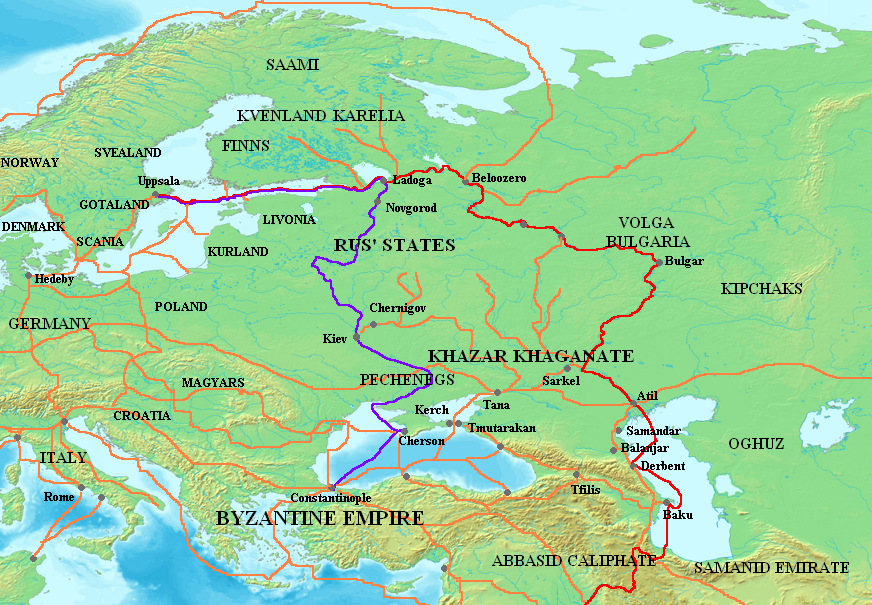
Map showing the major Varangian trade routes: the Volga trade route (in red) and the Trade Route from the Varangians to the Greeks (in purple). Other trade routes of the eighth-eleventh centuries shown in orange.

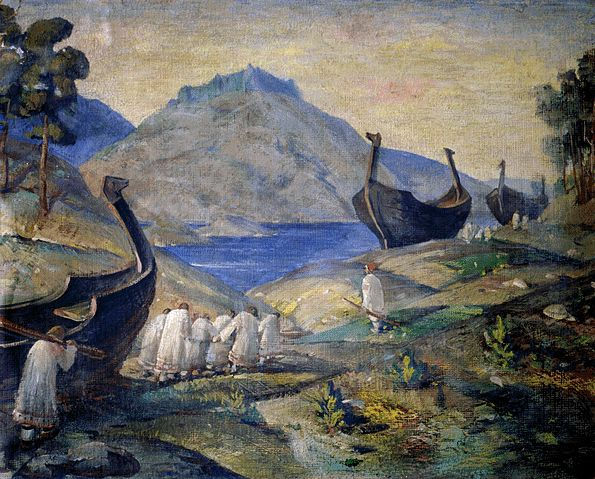
Volok by Nicholas Roerich, 1915

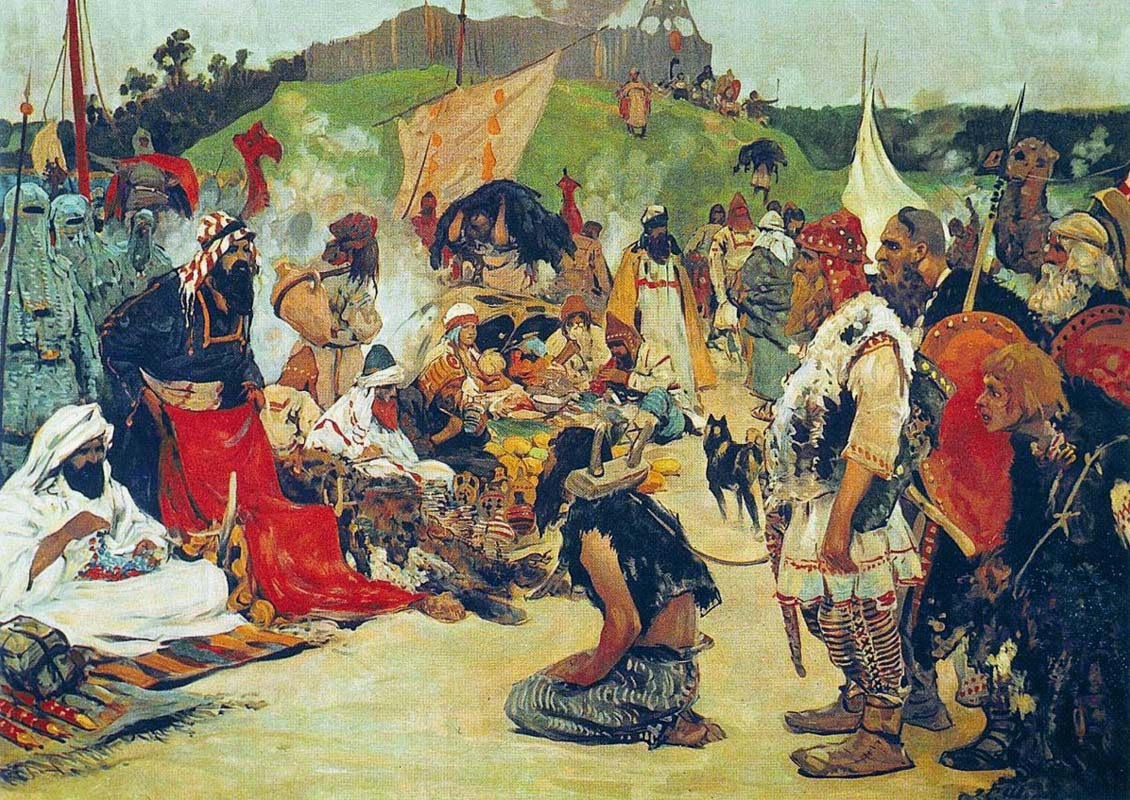
S. V. Ivanov. Trade negotiations in the country of Eastern Slavs. Pictures of Russian history. (1909)

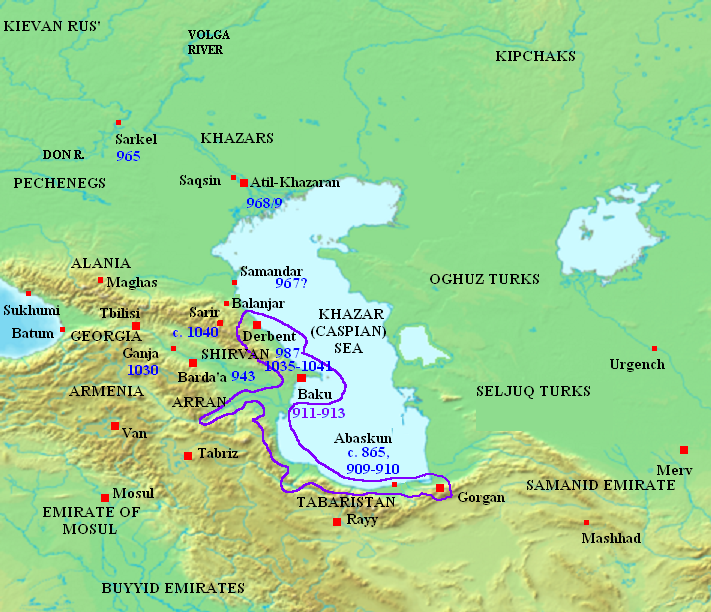
Rus Caspian

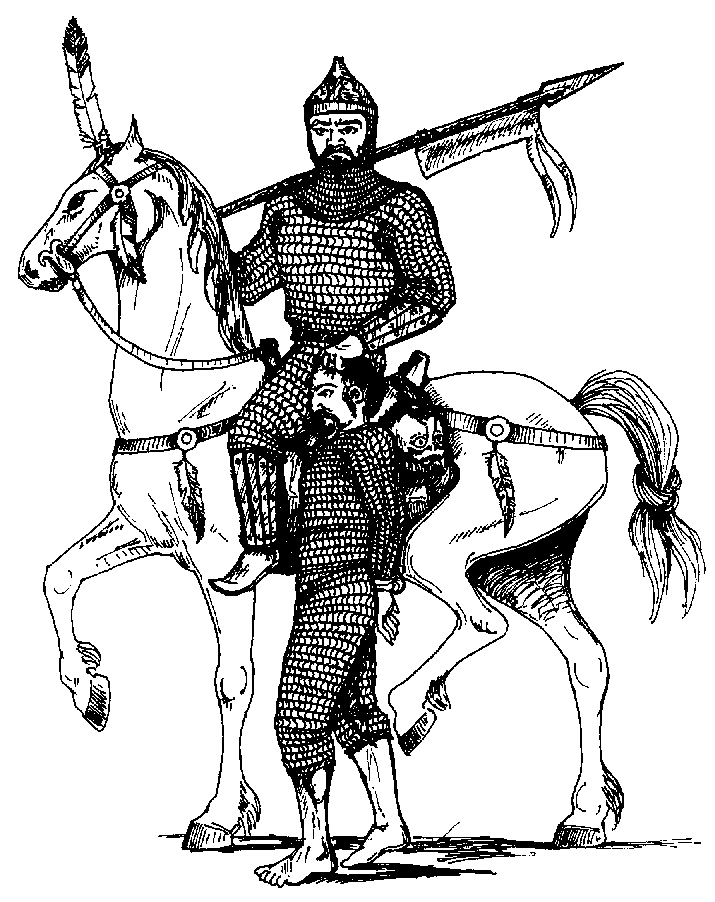
Khazar

Slaves were one of the main goods traded in the Khazar Khaganate in Central Asia and Eastern Europe. The Khazar Khaganate was a buffer state between Europe and the Muslim world and played a major part in the trade between Europe and the Middle East between the 8th and 10th centuries. The Khazar slave trade was one of the major routes of the human trafficking of saqaliba slaves from Europe to the Muslim world, between the 8th-century until the 10th century, when it was replaced by the Volga Bulgarian slave trade.

== History ==
The Khazar Khaganate had initially been an adversary of the Umayyad Caliphate, due to a series of conflicts between them from c. 642 to 799 CE. In the late 8th century however, the Khazar Khaganate made peace with the Abbasid Caliphate, and between c. 775 – c. 900 the state served a key role as the intermediary in trade between Europe and the Muslim world, in which the slave trade played a major part.

=== Slave trade ===
The Khazar Khaganate played a key role for the viking trade route in the 8th and 9th-centuries: the Khazars bought slaves captured by the Vikings in Europe, and exported them to the Abbasid Caliphate of the Middle East via Iran.

The main route of European slaves to the Caliphate was the Eastern Volga trade route via Russia and Central Asia down to Baghdad via Persia. Initially via the Khazar slave trade, and later via the Samanid slave trade. People taken captive during the Viking raids in Europe could be brought to Scandinavia or sold to Moorish Spain via the Dublin slave trade. Between the eighth and tenth centuries, captives from Eastern Europe were transported to elite households in the Islamic world as well as Byzantium. Arab merchants from the Caspian Sea and Byzantine merchants from the Black Sea brought their wares to the trade markets of Rus’, exchanging them for slaves, and until the early 10th-century, this trade route between Europe and the Abbasid Caliphate passed via the Khazar Khaganate.

The Magyar tribes were another supplier of slaves to the Khazar slave trade, and the Khazar reportedly bought slaves from the Magyars described as war captives.

The Khazar did not only buy slaves from other people, but also conducted their own slave raids to supply slaves for their slave trade. To perform slave raids was a common practice among the Nomadic people of the Central Asian Steppe, and the Khazars conducted regular slave raids toward several neighboring dar al-harb peoples, among them particularly the Pechenegs, the Ghuzz, and the Burta peoples.

=== Slave market ===
The majority of the slaves trafficked to the Khazar Khaganate where exported to slavery in the Abbasid Caliphate, but there were also a slave market for domestic use in the Khazar Khaganate. Slaves bought for the domestic market were all officially categorized as pagans, since the Khazars did not formally approve of the enslavement of Monotheists (Christians, Jews or Muslims). There were a market for slaves used as domestic servants, agricultural laborers, slave soldiers and other tasks within the Khazar Khaganate.

Slaves bought for export were transported from the Khazar Khaganate to either the Black Sea slave trade in the west via the Black Sea port of Kerch, or east from the capital of Atil via the Caspian Sea to Central Asia and from there to the Caliphate.

=== End of the slave trade ===
The Khazar slave trade flourished in the 9th century until a crisis occurred during the Anarchy at Samarra which destabilized the Abbasid Caliphate during the period from 861 to 870, and the dirham found in Europe diminished.

In the early 10th century, the trade of saqaliba slaves from Europe to the Caliphate was redirected, and the Khazar slave trade was replaced by the Volga Bulgarian slave trade. During the 10th century, the vikings instead sold their captives to Volga Bulgaria, who exported them by caravan around the Khazar Khaganate to the Abbasid Caliphate via the Samanid slave trade in Central Asia instead, and the Arab silver dirham found in Europe now came from the Samanid Empire rather than directly from the Abbasid Caliphate.

The Khazar Khaganate initially reacted to this change by making Volga Bulgaria their tributary state in order to continue to profit by the slave trade to the Caliphate, but it resulted in Volga Bulgaria converting to Islam in the 920s and becoming directly aligned with the Caliphate. The Volga Bulgarian slave trade and its connection with the slave trade via Bukhara to the Caliphate continued to the Mongol invasions of the 13th-century.

== See also ==
- Prague slave trade
- Kievan Rus' slave trade
