= Prostitution in Egypt =

Prostitution is illegal in Egypt. The Egyptian National Police officially combats prostitution but, like almost all other countries, prostitution exists in Egypt. UNAIDS estimate there to be 23,000 prostitutes in the country, including Egyptians, West Africans and Eastern Europeans.

== History ==
=== Ancient Egypt ===
Little is known about the practice of prostitution in ancient Egypt. The Turin Erotic Papyrus depicts women—possibly prostitutes—engaged in sexual acts with men. Permanent body adornment, such as tattoos in the form of dotted diamond shapes on the thighs of figurines and mummies, or images of the god Bes, appear on depictions of professional entertainers and prostitutes. Strabo, writing about Roman Egypt, noted that daughters of noble families could be dedicated to the service of the god Amun (or Zeus); such a girl was said to become a prostitute, engaging in sex with whomever she pleased until the onset of menstruation.

=== Roman occupation ===
As in the rest of the Roman Empire, prostitution was regulated. Prostitutes had to be registered and taxes were collected from them.

=== Islamic Middle Ages (641–1517) ===
During the era of slavery in the Muslim world, prostitution was connected to slavery in Egypt. The Islamic Law formally prohibited prostitution. However, since Islamic Law allowed a man to have sexual intercourse with his female slave in accordance with the principle of concubinage in Islam, prostitution was practiced by a pimp selling his female slave on the slave market to a client, who was allowed to have intercourse with her as her new owner, and who then returned his ownership of her to her pimp on the pretext of discontent after having had intercourse with her, which was a legal and accepted method for prostitution in the Islamic world for centuries until the era of Ottoman Empire.

Aside from female slaves, there were however also free prostitutes. Prostitution was generally tolerated and taxed during this period, the rulers taking the view that prohibition would not stop prostitution and that tax revenue would be lost.

There were periods when prostitution (of free prostitutes) was prohibited following pressure on the rulers from Muslim clerics.

=== Ottoman rule (1517–1805) ===
Prostitution was connected to slavery during the era of slavery in Ottoman Egypt. Since Islamic Law allowed a man to have sexual intercourse with his female slave in accordance with the principle of concubinage in Islam, prostitution was practiced by a pimp selling his female slave on the slave market to a client, who was allowed to have intercourse with her as her new owner, and who then returned his ownership of her to her pimp on the pretext of discontent after having had intercourse with her, which was a legal and accepted method for prostitution in the Islamic world.

Under Ottoman rule, the regulation and taxation of (free) prostitutes continued. During the 17th century two guilds for prostitutes were set up.

=== French occupation (1798–1801) ===
Prostitution flourished following the French invasion of Egypt in 1798. The French authorities organised the arrival of additional prostitutes from Europe. Sexually Transmitted Infections (STI) spread rapidly through the brothels, prompting the French administration to enact a law prohibiting French troops from entering brothels or bringing prostitutes in their quarters. Violators of the law faced the death penalty.

=== Rule of Muhammad Ali dynasty (1805–1953) ===
In 1834 Muhammad Ali Pasha outlawed prostitution and female public dancing in Cairo. The prostitutes and dancers were sent to Upper Egypt, especially Kena, Esna and Aswan. In 1837 he extended this to all of Egypt.

Many of the procurers and prostitutes who had accompanied the British and French troops to Constantinople during the Crimean war in the 1850s opened brothels in Port Said in Egypt during the construction of the Suez Canal, and these brothels was a destination for many victims of the white slave trade, since they were under protection of the foreign consulates because of the so-called capitulatory privileges, which until 1937 protected them from the police by exempting foreign citizens in Egypt from Egyptian law.

Article 240 of the Mixed Penal Code of 1867 states: A pimp who incites young men or women below the age of 21 to evil practices leading to rape is to be punished by a period of imprisonment not less than one month and not more than one year. Article 241 increases the penalty if the offence is committed by the father, mother or guardian of a minor.

In 1884, the Anglo-Egyptian Slave Trade Convention pressed upon Egypt by the British explicitly banned the sex slave trade of "white women" to slavery in Egypt; this law was particularly targeted against the import of white women (mainly from Caucasus and usually Circassians via the Circassian slave trade), which were the preferred choice for harem concubines among the Egyptian upper class. The Anglo-Egyptian Slave Trade Convention of did not abolish slavery in Egypt, but it abolished the slave trade and gave the right to existing slaves the legal right to apply for manumission at the British Consulate or at four Manumission Bureaus established in different parts of the country, and thousands of slaves used the opportunity and many recently freed female slaves turned to prostitution to survive British abolitionists in Egypt opened a home for former female slaves to assist them and protect them from falling victim to prostitution in Egypt, which was in operation from 1884 until 1908.

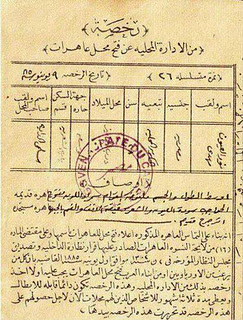
1885 prostitute license issued in the Cairo municipality

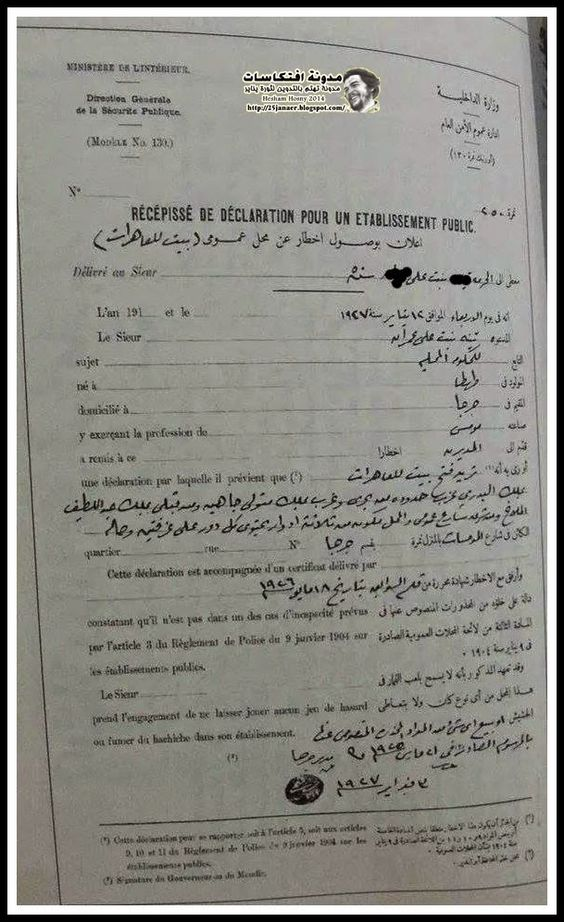
1927 Girga brothel license

After the British occupation of 1882, the authorities were concerned about disease spreading amongst the troops. They made legal provisions to control prostitution and introduced a system of healthcare. In July 1885 Egypt's Ministry of the Interior introduced regulationism for the health inspection of prostitutes. Further regulations were introduced in 1896 to control brothels.

One of the main destinations for the victims of the white slave trade sex trafficking were brothels in Egypt operated by foreign residents. A local branch of the International Bureau for the Suppression of the Traffic in Women was therefore founded in Alexandria in 1904 and in Port Said in 1914 to address the issue. However, the European consulates in Egypt did not want to support a law against the sex trafficking because it would interfere with the Capitulatory privileges, and the brothel owners belonged to the most frequent clients of the consulates.

Australian soldiers stationed in Egypt in World War I, including the famous half Chinese Australian sniper Billy Sing, were major customers of Egyptian prostitutes in the local red light districts and brothels. High prices charged by prostitutes in Cairo led to the Battle of the Wazzir, a major riot by New Zealand and Australian soldiers that took place on Good Friday in 1915 in "Haret el Wasser", a street in the city's Wagh El Birket red light district. The Australian military arranged for medical treatment for venereal diseases among its soldiers in Port Said and Cairo.

In 1932 a cabinet decree abolished licences for prostitution and established the "Public Morals Police".

A new penal code was introduced in 1937 and included a section to punish men who lived off the earnings of prostitutes.

In 1949 Military Order no. 76 was issued abolishing brothels.

Law No. 68, introduced in 1951, penalizing:

- Acts of prostitution if carried out habitually
- Acts of prostitution whether carried out by males or females. (The term prostitution was used in regard to females; for males the term used was licentiousness.)
- Acts inciting others to engage in prostitution
- International trading of prostitutes (white slavery)
- The provision of housing or other premises where prostitutes can carry on their trade
- The advertisement of prostitution whether in an open or disguised way.

== Pimping ==
The prostitution system in Egypt often depends on pimping, although women also work alone. Pimps in Egypt organize the work of a group of prostitutes and receive a percentage of their profits. This is called "the network" in Egypt. This system is mainly used in Cairo and Alexandria and other big cities.

== Nikah mut'ah ==
Nikah mut'ah is a temporary marriage allowed under Shia Islamic law. The 'marriage' may last for a term of one hour to one year. It is sometimes used to circumvent the prostitution laws.

=== Summer marriages ===
Wealthy men from the Gulf states often holiday in Egypt in the summer months. Whilst there they may take a young, temporary bride (often under-age) in a so-called summer marriage. The marriages are arranged through a marriage broker and the girl's parents receive gifts and money as a 'dowry'. The marriage ends when the men return to their own country.

== Prostitution in the economy ==
As prostitution is illegal in Egypt, no taxes are paid. The legal punishment for adultery is a jail sentence of up to six months. For prostitution, the sentence is up to 3 years.

== Sex trafficking ==
Egypt is a source, transit, and destination country for women and children subjected to sex trafficking. Egyptian children are vulnerable to sex trafficking. People from the Persian Gulf, including Saudi Arabia, United Arab Emirates, and Kuwait purchase Egyptian women and girls for "temporary" or "summer" marriages for the purpose of commercial sex, including cases of sex trafficking; these arrangements are often facilitated by the victims' parents and marriage brokers, who profit from the transaction. Child sex tourism occurs primarily in Cairo, Alexandria, and Luxor.

Women and girls, including refugees and migrants, from Asia, Sub-Saharan Africa, and the Middle East endure sex trafficking in Egypt. As of 2018 Syrian refugees settled in Egypt remained vulnerable to exploitation, including sex trafficking, and transactional marriages of girls—which can lead to sexual exploitation, including sex trafficking.

The United States Department of State Office to Monitor and Combat Trafficking in Persons ranks Egypt as a 'Tier 2' country.
