= Human trafficking in Egypt =

Egypt is a source, transit, and destination country for trafficking of women and children, specifically for forced labor and forced prostitution.

The U.S. State Department's Office to Monitor and Combat Trafficking in Persons placed the country in "Tier 2" in 2017, meaning that its government does not fully meet the minimum standards described in the Victims of Trafficking and Violence Protection Act of 2000 (TVPA), but is making significant efforts toward meeting those standards. The country was placed on the Tier 2 Watch List in 2023.

Egypt ratified the 2000 UN TIP (Trafficking in Persons) Protocol in March 2004.

In 2023, the Organised Crime Index noted the prevalence of human trafficking and organ trafficking.

== Background in 2010 ==
Some of Egypt's estimated two hundred thousand to one million street children - both boys and girls - were exploited in prostitution and forced begging. Local gangs were, at times, involved in this exploitation. Egyptian children were recruited for domestic and agricultural labor; some of these children faced conditions indicative of involuntary servitude, such as restrictions on movement, non-payment of wages, threats, and physical or sexual abuse.

In addition, wealthy men from Persian Gulf region reportedly traveled to Egypt to purchase "temporary" or "summer marriages" with Egyptian females, including girls who are under the age of 18. These arrangements were often facilitated by the females' parents and marriage brokers and were a form of commercial sexual exploitation of children. Child sex tourism occurs in Cairo, Alexandria, and Luxor. Egypt was a transit country for women trafficked from Uzbekistan, Moldova, Ukraine, Russia, and other Eastern European countries to Israel for commercial sexual exploitation. Organized crime groups are involved in these movements.

Men and women from South and Southeast Asia may have been subjected to forced labor in Egypt. Ethiopians, Eritreans, Sudanese, Indonesians, Filipino, and possible Sri Lankan females migrated willingly to Egypt but may have been subjected to forced domestic work. Some conditions they faced include no time off, sexual, physical, and emotional abuse, withholding of wages, and restrictions of movement. Employers may have used the domestic workers' illegal status and lack of employment contracts as a coercive tool.

Some of the immigrants and refugees who engaged in prostitution may have been coerced to do so. Young female Sudanese refugees, including those under 18, may have been coerced into prostitution in Cairo's nightclubs by family or Sudanese gang members. NGO and media reports indicated some Egyptians were forced to work in Jordan and experienced the withholding of passports, forced overtime, non-payment of wages, and restrictions of movement.

In 2010, the Egyptian government approved new legislation criminalizing trafficking in persons for labor and sexual exploitation. In 2009/2010, the government made its first two convictions under the 2008 anti-trafficking amendments to the Child Law and raised awareness on "summer marriages", which are often used to facilitate commercial sexual exploitation. According to the U.S. government, the Egyptian government's lack of formal victim identification procedures and protection services allowed unidentified victims of trafficking to be punished for unlawful acts committed as a direct result of being trafficked.

== Seasonal or temporary marriage ==
There is a phenomenon in Egypt known as "seasonal" or "temporary" marriages. This is when young women and girls - particularly from poor families - are married off to men from Arab states of the Persian Gulf to provide sexual services to non-Egyptian men. Pursuant to a survey that was conducted by the National Council for Childhood and Motherhood (NCCM), 67% of 2,000 of families selected from a sample in Al Hawamdia, Al Badrashein and Abu Almonros were personally aware of child marriages. The survey also showed that the purpose of these marriages is mainly economic.

In some instances, Egyptian girls may return to the husbands home country and work as a maid. The girls that stay in Egypt are often shunned from society and struggle to remarry the orthodox way, especially in cases where the women has given birth to the husband's child.

Egypt: Law No. 103 of 1976 also known as the New Tourism Marriage Law was enacted to deter and protect young girls from seasonal/temporary marriage. The law requires documentation of marriage contracts, requiring a foreign man to present a certificate from his country's embassy stating that there are no impediments to the effecting marriage, a deposit is also made in the girl's name, as security for her when the women is 25 years or more younger than him.

The minimum age for marriage was also raised to 18. The special rapporteur Joy Ngozi Ezeilo states that in practice, this law is largely ineffective as an arbitrary number of seasonal/temporary marriages between Egyptian women and non-Egyptian men continue to take place.

== Institutional framework ==
The National Coordinating Committee directs all anti-trafficking efforts at the national level. The National Coordinating Committee is directed by the advisor to the minister of foreign affairs and is made up of relevant representatives of ministries, such as the Ministry of Interior, the Ministry of Justice, the Ministry of Manpower and Migration, the Ministry of Social Solidarity and the Ministry of Tourism. The committee drafts legislation and a plan on fighting trafficking persons in Egypt, by combatting illegal migrants groups and identifying human trafficking activities. There has also been legislation enacted to combat human trafficking and protect those illegal migrants by diminishing their suffering.

The National Council of Women (NCW), was established in 2000 to monitor accomplishments and to strengthen women's role in society. In 2007, the prime minister launched a coordinating committee to combat trafficking in humans, namely women and children. This committee aims to review legislation and policies implemented to prevent trafficking.

NCW also Implemented the Convention on the Elimination of all forms of discrimination against women (CEDAW) This is a specialist unit which fights against trafficking and carries out follow up studies and reports on trafficking of girls and women. In April 2009, NCW issued a report on violence against women in Egypt, which recognized "seasonal" or "temporary" marriage as a possible form of human trafficking and suggested that decision makers determine whether it should be considered as human trafficking.

In 2016, the Government implemented a 2016-2021 plan to fight and prevent trafficking. This was approved by the prime minister however there were little means and resources allocated towards its implementation. In 2016 the national anti trafficking committee and the national committee merged aiming to prevent illegal migration, the government also launched 90 anti-trafficking campaigns. In June 2016, the government ran conferences about migration, smuggling, and human trafficking issues affecting Africa and Europe. Surprise inspections were carried out by the Ministry of Manpower particularly at work sites for foreign workers, though the ministry did not report potential trafficking victims.

== Prosecution (2010) ==
Egypt's parliament has passed legislation criminalizing all forms of human trafficking and prescribing penalties from three to 15 years' imprisonment and up to life imprisonment if aggravating circumstances are present. Fines range from $9,000 to $36,000 for offenses. Amendments to the Child Law (No. 126 of 2008) include provisions prohibiting the trafficking of children for commercial sexual exploitation and forced labor. These amendments prescribe sentences of at least five years' imprisonment.

== Protection (2010) ==
According to the U.S. government, Egyptian officials did not employ formal procedures to identify victims of trafficking and refer them to providers of care; as a result, trafficking victims - including many street children and women arrested for prostitution - were often treated as criminals rather than victims. Some children may be sent to juvenile detention centers, which are usually in poor conditions. Others may be subject to incarceration with adults, despite the Child Law which prohibits this practice.

Border security personnel in the Sinai continued efforts to interdict undocumented immigrants, occasionally killing some of them, while showing no evidence of efforts to identify possible trafficking victims among this vulnerable population. As of 2009, the Ministry of Social Solidarity operated 19 drop-in centers for street children, women, and the disabled that may have provided care to trafficking victims.

The NCCM operates a 24-hour hotline to respond to complaints of child abuse. Specialized care for adults or foreign victims was not provided as of 2009. In prisons or detention centers, law enforcement officers may have further mistreated these victims through verbal, physical, and sexual abuse. Foreign victims are not offered legal alternatives to removal to countries in which they may face hardship or retribution. The government does not actively encourage victims to assist in investigations against their traffickers.

== Prevention (2010) ==
The government made progress in preventing "summer marriages" in the reporting period, but did not otherwise undertake efforts to prevent human trafficking. The government was mandated by the newly passed law to create an inter-ministerial committee to coordinate anti-trafficking enforcement activities, victim protection, and programs. The government did not institute any other public campaigns to raise awareness on trafficking, including any on involuntary domestic servitude.

The government made no efforts to reduce the demand for commercial sex acts or to raise awareness of sex tourism. The government has a well-developed birth registration and national identity card system. There were no reports of Egyptian government's efforts to provide anti-trafficking training for its troops before deploying them to international peacekeeping missions.

== See also ==
- Crime in Egypt
- Human rights in Egypt
- Slavery in Egypt
