= Slavery in Egypt =

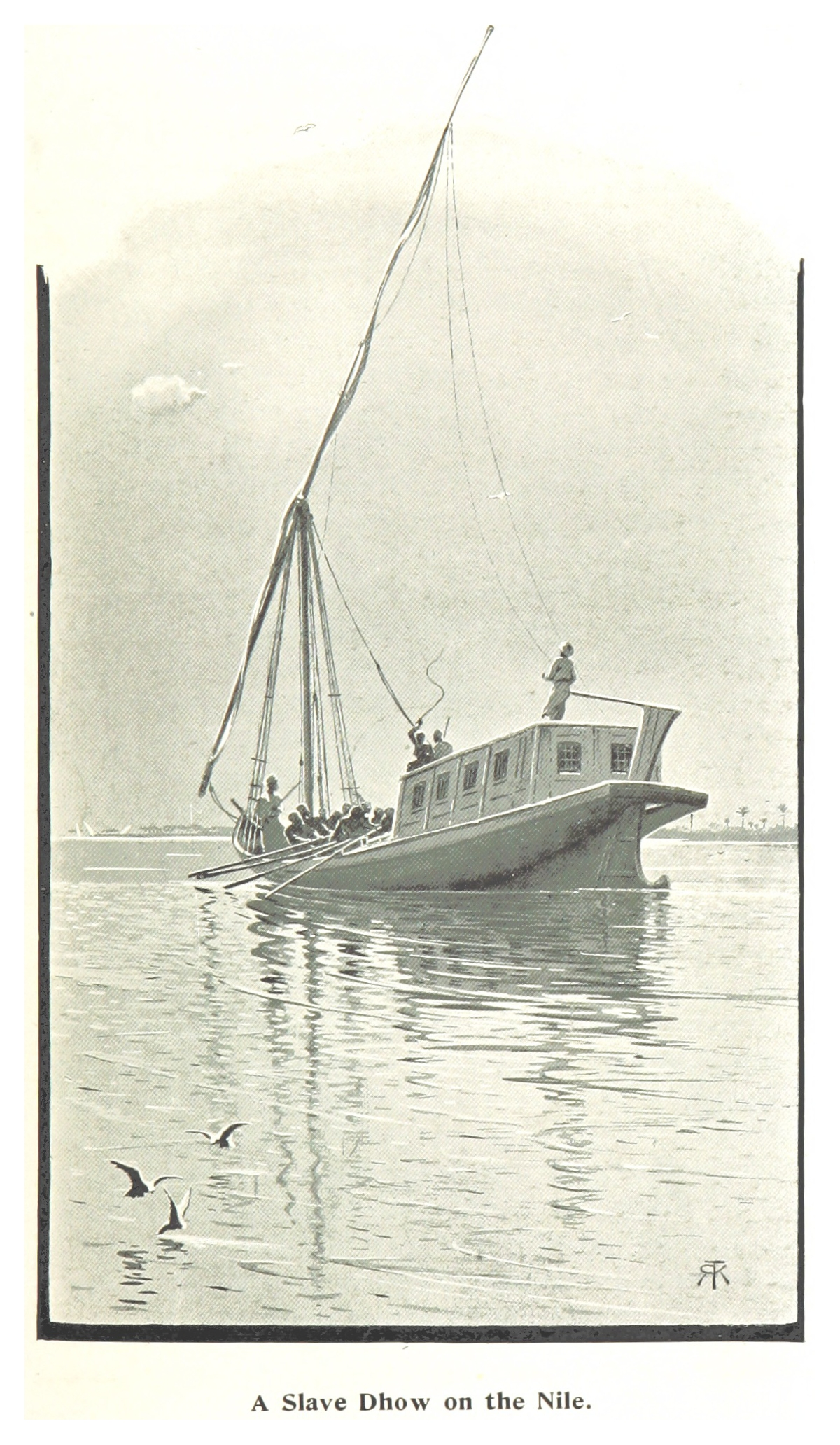
Slatin (1896): A Slave Dhow on the Nile

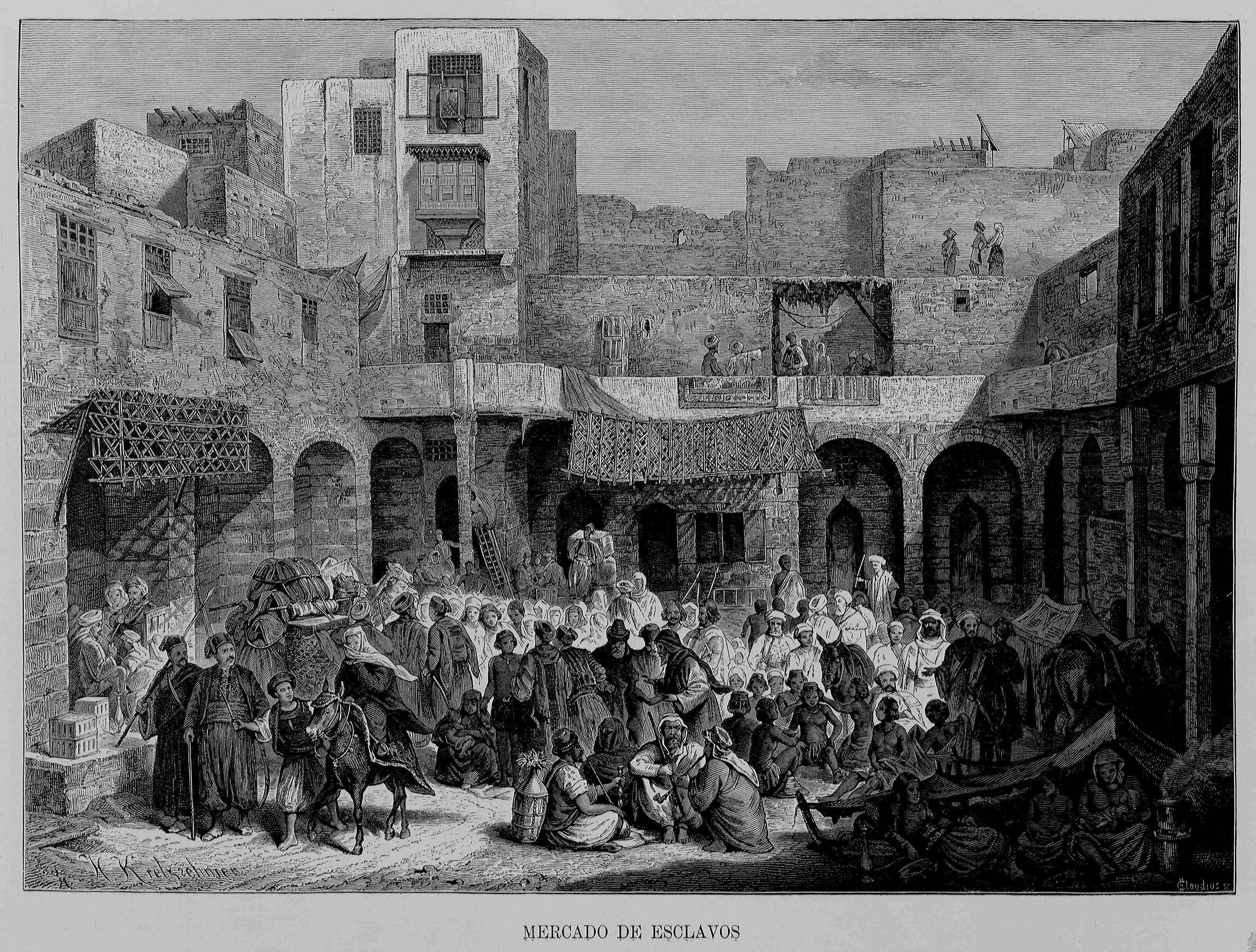
Egipto, 1882 "Mercado de esclavos" (21663624022)

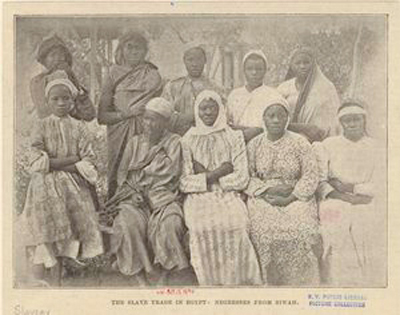
The Slave Trade In Egypt - Negresses From Siwah 1894

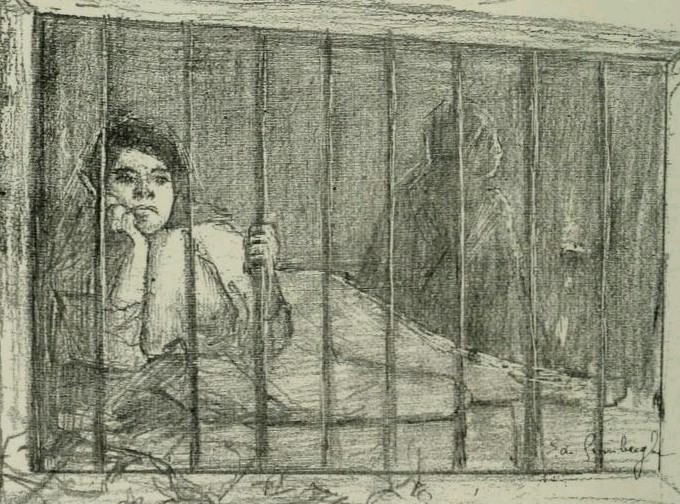
Courtisane au Caire.

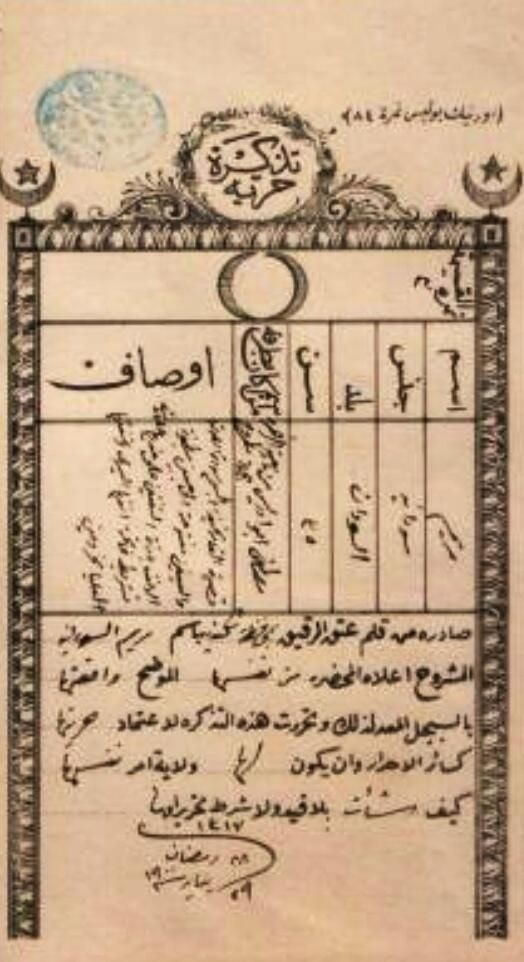
Certificate of slavery liberation - Police of Egypt 1900.

Slavery in Egypt was practised until the early 20th century. It differed from slavery in ancient Egypt, being managed in accordance with Islamic law from the conquest of the Caliphate in the 7th century until the practice stopped in the early 20th century, having been gradually phased out when the slave trade was banned in the late 19th century.

During the Islamic history of Egypt, slaves were mainly of three categories: male slaves used as soldiers and bureaucrats, female slaves used for sexual slavery as concubines, and female slaves and eunuchs used for domestic service in harems and private households. At the end of the period, there was a growing agricultural slavery. The people enslaved in Egypt during Islamic times mostly came from Europe and Caucasus (who were referred to as "white"), or from the Sudan and Africa south of the Sahara through the Trans-Saharan slave trade (who were referred to as "black"). British pressure led to the abolishment of the slave trade between 1877 and 1884. Slavery itself was not abolished, but it gradually died out after the abolition of the slave trade, since no new slaves could be legally acquired, and existing slaves were given the right to apply for freedom. People were still held as slaves as late as the 1930s.

To this day, Egypt remains a source, transit, and destination country for human trafficking, particularly forced labor and forced prostitution (cf. human trafficking in Egypt), although the government has taken steps to suppress such activities in the 21st century.

== Abbasid Egypt: 750–935 ==
Egypt was under the Abbasid Caliphate in 750–935. The institution of slavery therefore followed the institution of slavery in the Abbasid Caliphate, although it did have its own local character.

=== Slave trade ===
One slave route was from people with whom Egypt had a treaty. Egypt and Nubia maintained peace on the basis of the famous Baqṭ treaty, in which Nubia annually supplied slaves to Egypt, and Egypt textiles and wheat to Nubia. The baqt did not allow for direct slave raids to Nubia, however Egypt did purchase Nubian slaves captured by the Buja tribes living in the Eastern Desert of Nubia, as well as Buja slaves captured by Nubians; Egypt also conducted slave raids to Nubia or Buja whenever they broke the conditions of the treaty. Private Egyptian slave traders also conducted slave raids from Egypt's African hinterland using local violations of the peace agreements as a pretext. Egyptian slave traders often gave wrong origin of their captives on the slave market, making it impossible to know if the slaves had been captured from a people with whom Egypt had a peace agreement.

A second route was from areas with whom Egypt had no treaty, which in Islamic law made slave raids legal. Slave merchants also traded in people captured from nations with whom Muslim authorities had no peace agreement. The History of the Patriarchs noted that slave raids were conducted against the coasts of Byzantine Asia Minor and Europe, during which "Muslims carried off the Byzantines from their lands and brought a great number of them to Egypt (or Fusṭāṭ [Miṣr])". The 10th-century Ḥudūd al-ʿālam claims that Egyptian merchants kidnapped children from the "Blacks" south of Nubia, castrating the boys before trafficking them into Egypt.

A third route was when slave merchant illegally captured other Egyptians, which was forbidden by law. The captured Egyptians were normally either non-Muslim Egyptians, such as Coptic Christians, or the children of black former slaves.

=== Slave market ===
In this period, the perhaps most significant slave market place in Egypt was Fusṭāṭ. Slave merchants from the Near East, Byzantium, Europe, North Africa and the Mediterranean islands trafficked and sold slaves in Egypt, where according to the Egyptian jurist Aṣbagh b. al-Faraj (d. 839) "people desire above all imported slaves", and among the slaves trafficked were slaves of Slavic, European or Anatolian, Berber, and Sudanic African origin. The merchants sold eunuchs and "slave women (jawārī) and female servants (waṣāʾif)", and slaves are mentioned as perform extra-domestic tasks, ran errands, delivered or collected messages or goods, assisted their masters on business journeys or managed affairs during their masters absence, and was used as sex slaves (concubines).

During this period, slaves in Egypt were either born into slavery, or captives of slavers had who imported them from outside the Realm of Islam, and preserved documents suggest that it was imported slaves who dominated Egypt's slave market. Islam's encouragement to manumit slaves, and the free status granted to children a slave and master (coupled with the fact that most children born to slaves had free fathers), indicate that Egypt was dependent upon a steady flow of new slaves to uphold the slave population, since few slaves born to slaves became slaves themselves unless they were born to two slaves rather than to a slave woman and a free man.

==== Tulunid harem ====
The Tulunids (868–905) who ruled Egypt on behalf of the Abbasid Caliphate had a harem that included both legal wives, slave concubines and eunuchs, of the Abbasid harem model. The Tulunid harem were organized with legal wives and concubines whose sons were both consdered legitimate and eligible to become heirs, on accordance with Islamic law. The harem included a number of jawari, female slave entertainers. The women of the harem were attended to and guarded by slave eunuchs.

The founder Ahmad ibn Tulun (r. 868-884) owned a number of concubines, and appears to have had sons with at least three; he also had legal wives, of which one was the daughter of Yarjukh (d. 872), a Turkish commander of Samarra and early patron of his father (Ahmad ibn Tulun), and mother of al-Abbas, Ibn Tulun's eldest son and designated heir; his next son and heir, Khumarawayh, was the son of a concubine.

Khumarawayh ibn Ahmad ibn Tulun (r. 884-896) himself, the son of a concubine, reportedly suspected that his jawari-concubines were committing adultery with his eunuchs, and were killed by hs eunuchs in 896. Ibn al-Athir described the event of 896:

"Khumarawayh was told that his jawari in his palace in Egypt would have eunuchs as lovers, and enjoyed affairs with them like a husband would. He ordered his deputy to investigate the matter with the jawari. The eunuchs close to him in Damascus feared his reaction if the truth of their situation was revealed, and so decided collectively to kill him".

== Fatimid Caliphate: 969–1171 ==
During the Fatimid Caliphate (909–1171), that ruled Egypt from 969, slaves were trafficked to Egypt via several routes from non-Islamic lands in the South, North, West and East. The system of military slavery expanded during this time period, which created a bigger need for male slaves for use of military slavery. Female slaves were used for sexual slavery as concubines or as domestic servants.

=== Slave trade ===
The Trans-Saharan slave trade continued during the Mamluk Sultanate. Egypt was provided with Black African slaves from the Sudan via their centuries-old Baqt treaty until the 14th century. The closest relations were during the Fatimid period in Egypt. The Shi'ite Fatimids had few allies in the predominantly Sunni Islamic world, and Nubia was an important ally. The slaves sent from Nubia made up the backbone of the Fatimid army.

European saqaliba slaves were provided to Egypt via several routes. The Venetian Balkan slave trade expanded significantly during this time period. The al-Andalus slave trade also provided European slaves, originally imported via the Prague slave trade.

=== Slave market ===
==== Female slaves ====
Female slaves were primarily used as either domestic servants, or as concubines (sex slaves).

The slave market classified the slave in accordance with racial stereotypes; Berber slave women were seen as ideal for housework, sexual services and childbearing; black slave women as docile, robust and excellent wet nurses; Byzantine (Greek) as slaves who could be entrusted with valuables; Persian women as good child-minders; Arab slave women as accomplished singers, while Indian and Armenian girls were seen as hard to manage and control; the younger girls, the more attractive on the market.

==== Male slaves ====
Male slaves were used for both hard labor, eunuch service, and military slavery. The system of military slaver grew in importance during this time period.

In the Isma'ili Fatimid Caliphate (909–1171 CE), eunuchs played major roles in the politics of the caliphate's court within the institution of slavery in the Fatimid Caliphate. These eunuchs were normally purchased from slave auctions and typically came from a variety of Arab and non-Arab minority ethnic groups. In some cases, they were purchased from various noble families in the empire, which would then connect those families to the caliph. Generally, though, foreign slaves were preferred, described as the "ideal servants".

Once enslaved, eunuchs were often placed into positions of significant power in one of four areas: the service of the male members of the court; the service of the Fatimid harem, or female members of the court; administrative and clerical positions; and military service. For example, during the Fatimid occupation of Cairo, Egyptian eunuchs controlled military garrisons (shurta) and marketplaces (hisba), two positions beneath only the city magistrate in power. However, the most influential Fatimid eunuchs were the ones in direct service to the caliph and the royal household as chamberlains, treasurers, governors, and attendants. Their direct proximity to the caliph and his household afforded them a great amount of political sway. One eunuch, Jawdhar, became hujja to Imam-Caliph al-Qa'im, a sacred role in Shia Islam entrusted with the imam's choice of successor upon his death.

There were several other eunuchs of high regard in Fatimid history, mainly being Abu'l-Fadi Rifq al-Khadim and Abu'l-Futuh Barjawan al-Ustadh. Rifq was an African eunuch general who served as governor of the Damascus until he led an army of 30,000 men in a campaign to expand Fatimid control northeast to the city of Aleppo, Syria. He was noted for being able to unite a diverse group of Africans, Arabs, Bedouins, Berbers, and Turks into one coherent fight force which was able to successfully combat the Mirdasids, Bedouins, and Byzantines.

Barjawan was a European eunuch during late Fatimid rule who gained power through his military and political savvy which brought peace between them and the Byzantine empire. Moreover, he squashed revolts in the Libya and the Levant. Given his reputation and power in the court and military he took the reins of the caliphate from his then student al-Hakim bi-Amr Allah; then ruled as the de facto Regent 997 CE. His usurpation of power from the caliph resulted in his assassination in 1000 CE on the orders of al-Hakim.

==== Fatimid harem ====
The Fatimid Caliphate (909–1171) built upon the established model of the Abbasid harem. The Abbasid harem system came to be a role model for the harems of later Islamic rulers, and the same model can be found in subsequent Islamic nations during the Middle Ages, including the harem of the Fatimid Caliphate in Egypt. The Fatimid harem consisted of the same model as the Abbasid harem, and was organized in a model in which the mother took the first rank, followed by slave concubines who became umm walad when giving birth; enslaved female Jawaris entertainers, enslaved female stewardesses named qahramana's, and eunuchs.

The highest ranked woman in the Fatimid harem were normally the mother of the Caliph, or alternatively the mother of the heir or a female relative, who was given the title sayyida ("lady") or al-sayyida al-malika ("lady of the queen"). The consorts of the Caliph were originally slave-girls whom the Caliph either married or used as concubines (sex slaves); in either case, a consort of the Caliph was referred to as jiha or al-jiha al-aliya ("Her Highness"). The concubines of the Fatimid Caliphs were in most cases of Christian origin, described as beautiful singers, dancers and musicians; they were often the subject of love poems, but also frequently accused of manipulating the Caliph. The third rank harem women were slave-girls trained in singing, dancing and playing music to perform as entertainers; this category was sometimes given as diplomatic gifts between male power holders. The lowest rank of harem women were the slave-girls selected to become servants and performed a number of different tasks in the harem and royal household; these women were called shadadat and had some contact with the outside world, as they trafficked goods from the outside world to the harem via the underground tunnels known as saradib.

All (slave) women employed at court were called mustakhdimat or qusuriyyat; women employed in the royal household were called muqimat and those employed in the royal workshops were in Fustat or Qarafa were called munqaqitat. Slave women worked in royal workshops, arbab al-san'i min al-qusuriyyat, which manufactured clothing and food; those employed at the public workshops were called zahir and those working in the workshops who manufactured items exclusively for the royal household were called khassa. There were often about thirty slave women in each workshop who worked under the supervision of a female slave called zayn al-khuzzan, a position normally given to a Greek slave woman.

The enslaved eunuchs managed the women of the harem, guarded them, informed them and reported on them to the Caliph, and acted as their link to the outside world.

The harem of both the Caliph himself as well as other male members of the upper classes could include thousands of slaves: the vizier Ibn for example had a household of 800 concubines and 4,000 male bodyguards.

== Ayyubid Sultanate: 1171–1250 ==
The Ayyubid Sultanate (1171–1250) included both Egypt and Syria, and the institution of slavery in these areas thus had a shared history during the Ayyubid dynasty.

=== Slave trade ===
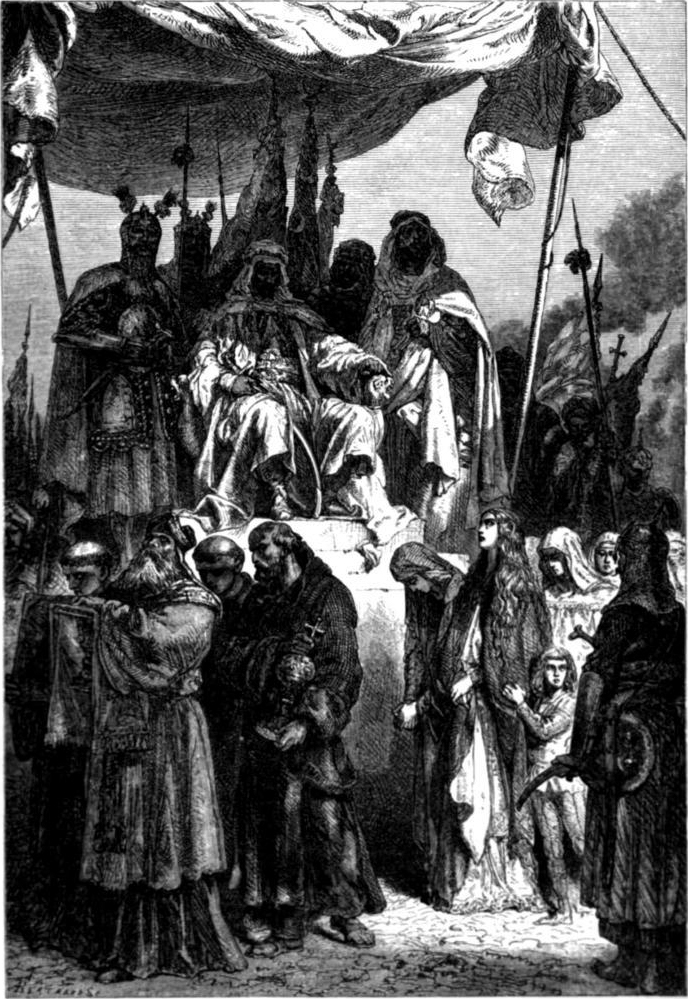
Christians before Saladin: many civilian inhabitants of Jerusalem was sold in to sexual slavery after the Siege of Jerusalem (1187).

African slaves were transported in to Egypt via the slave trade from the Sudan. The baqt treaty was still famously functioning during this time period. However relations were worse under the Ayyubids which did start to affect the Baqt enforcement.

The Trans-Saharan slave trade provided African slaves from the West.

The Red Sea slave trade from the provided slaves to the East coast of Egypt. These were mainly Africans. However, there are also Indians noted to have been transported to Egypt via the Red Sea slave trade.

The Venetian slave trade exported slaves to Egypt primarily via the now Balkan slave trade during this time period.

Turkish and other Asian slaves were exported to Egypt from Central Asia via the Bukhara slave trade. Turkish men were particularly valued as slave soldiers.

=== War captives ===
Christian captives from the Crusader states are known to have been enslaved during the two centuries of Christian Crusader rule. This included not only male warriors but also civilians such as women and children.

A famous incident was the Siege of Jerusalem (1187). 15,000 of those who could not pay the ransom were sold into slavery. According to Imad ad-Din al-Isfahani, 7,000 of them were men and 8,000 were women and children. Contemporary Muslim sources describe the rape and enslavement on non-Muslim women and girls after the fall of Jerusalem:

Women and children together came to 8,000 and were quickly divided up among us, bringing a smile to Muslim faces at their lamentations. How many well-guarded women were profaned and women who had been kept hidden stripped of their modesty, and virgins dishonoured and proud women deflowered, and lovey women's red lips kissed, and happy ones made to weep. How many noblemen took them as concubines, how many ardent men blazed for one of them, and celibates were satisfied by them, and thirsty men sated by them and turbulent men able to give vent to their passion.

— — Translation of the account of Saladin's secretary Imad al-Din of the treatment of female captives following the siege of Jerusalem

=== Slave market ===
There was a numerical superiority of female slaves over male slaves to Egypt.

Female slaves were primarily used as either domestic maids or as concubines (sex slaves). Shajar al-Durr became one of the most famous former slave concubines of the Royal Ayyubid harem.

A significant market for male slaves to Egypt was the institution of mamluk military slavery, an institution of major importance in the Ayyubid Sultanate. Many of the slave soldiers were of either Turkish or Circassian origin.

==== Ayyubid harem ====
The Royal harem of the Ayyubid dynasty of Egypt and the Levant (1171–1250) was similar to its predecessor, the Fatimid harem.

The wives and mothers and female relatives of the Ayyubid sultans are rarely known in more detail. In some cases, the Ayyubid sultans married free Muslim women: Sultan Saladin was married to several wives, the most known of whom was Ismat ad-Din Khatun, and Sultan was married to Sitti Sawda. However, in most cases it appears the Sultans preferred to use slave concubines for procreation.

Non-Muslim female slaves were imported as kafirs (infidels) from dar al-harb (the non-Muslim world) and forced to convert to Islam upon arrival. In the harem, female slaves would work as servants or chosen for sexual slavery as concubines. Some slave-girls were trained in accomplishments of the arts to perform as qiyan-entertainers, and some of the most favored royal Ayyubid concubines had been qiyan-artists, such as Surur (qiyan) and Adschība (qiyan).

A Sultan did not have to marry, and some of them did not. Instead, they procreated via concubines. A concubine who had given birth to a child whose paternity was acknowledged by the Sultan, raised to the status of Umm Walad, and as the mother of a royal child was considered a true member of the royal dynasty. The Sultan could manumit and marry a concubine, but it was not necessary for him to do so, since by Islamic law, the son of a concubine was not defined as illegitimate of his father acknowledge paternity. The most famous member of the Ayyubid harem was Shajar al-Durr, who entered as a slave concubine, was manumitted by the birth of an acknowledged child and, in a unique case, conquered the throne after the death of her former enslaver.

The wife or concubine who had given birth to the designated heir to the throne, had the highest rank of the harem. Aside from the female slaves, the women of the harem were assisted by eunuchs.

== Mamluk Sultanate: 1250–1517 ==
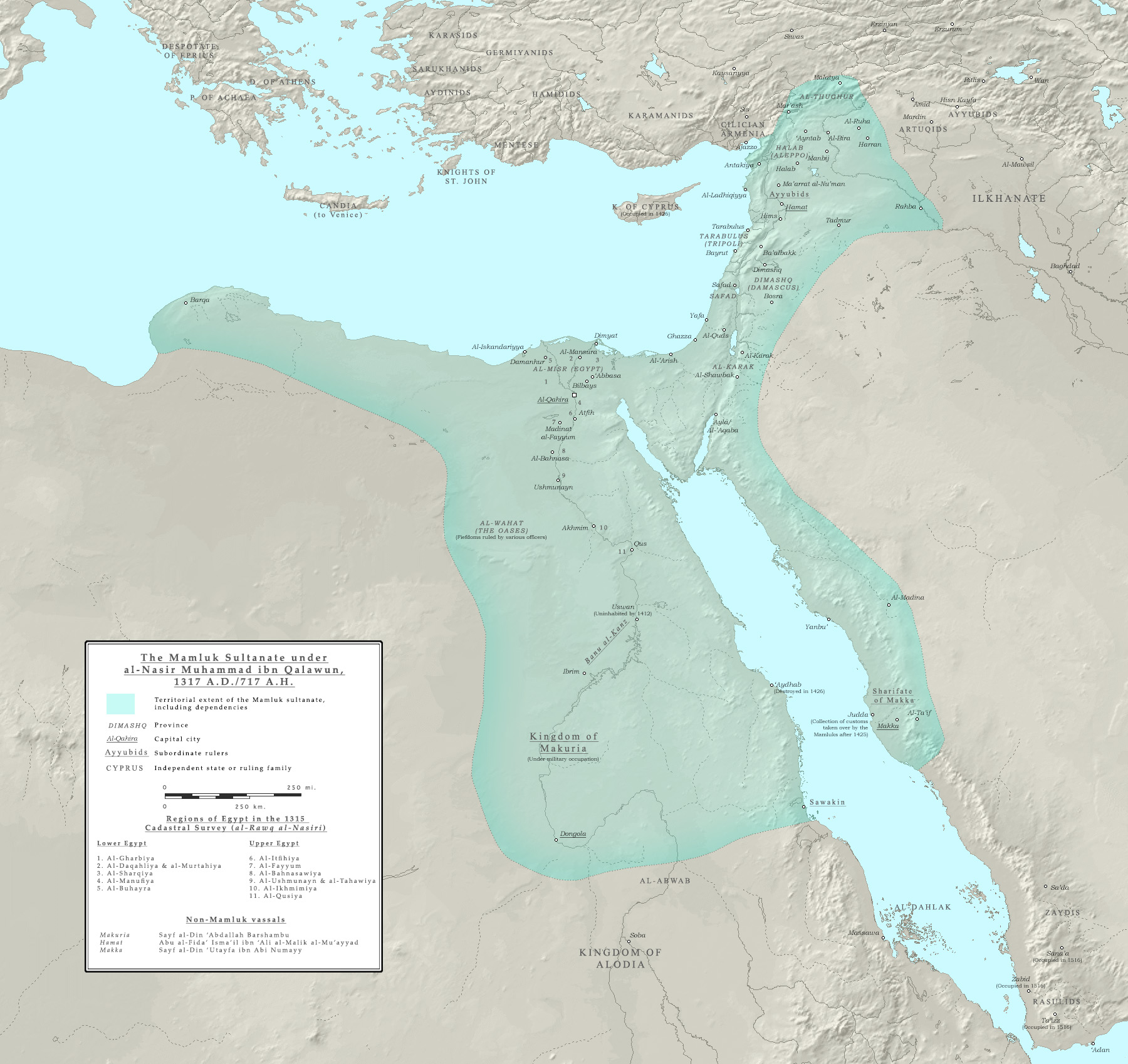
Mamluk Sultanate of Cairo 1317 AD

During the Mamluk Sultanate era (1250–1517), society in Egypt was founded upon a system of military slavery. Male slaves trafficked for use as military slaves, mamluk, were a dominating social class in Egypt. The Mamluk slaves were initially often Turks from Central Asia, but from about 1400 their origin shifted to Circassian and European. Female slaves were used for sexual slavery and domestic maid service.

Slaves were imported from several directions. Turkic and Circassian slaves from Central Asia and the Black Sea were imported for military use and concubinage. African slaves were imported for labor from the South; and Europeans were imported from the North. Greek slaves were supplied from the religious border zone in Anatolia.

=== Slave trade ===
The Trans-Saharan slave trade continued during the Mamluk Sultanate. Egypt was provided with Black African slaves via their centuries-old Baqt treaty until the 14th century. It was during the Mamluk Sultanate that the slaves supplied via the Baqt treaty ended. Relations were worse under the Ayyubids and very poor under the Mamluks, with full-scale war eventually breaking out.

Greek slaves were provided by Genoese and Muslim Turks in Anatolia, which in this time period was a religious border zone between the Muslim world (Dar al-islam and the Dar al-harb) and thus according to Islamic regulations a legitimate slave supply source. Greek slaves were often sold as luxury slaves and sold for household and sophisticated tasks. Sultan al-Malik al-Nasir (r. 1299–1340), expanded the import of Greek slaves from Rum (Anatolia) and Turkish slaves Central Asia.

Two main routes from Europe provided Egypt with European slaves. The Balkan slave trade and the Black Sea slave trade, managed via the Venetian slave traders and the Genoese slave traders, provided Egypt with many of the male slaves used as mamluk slave soldiers.

Until the late 14th-century, future (Turkish) Mamluks were regularly imported from Central Asia. However this changed in around 1400. The Balkan slave trade was, alongside the Black Sea slave trade, one of the two main slave supply sources of future Mamluk soldiers to the Mamluk Sultanate in Egypt. While the majority of the slaves trafficked via the Black Sea slave trade to South Europe (Italy and Spain) were girls, since they were intended to become ancillae maid servants, the majority of the slaves, around 2,000 annually, were trafficked to the Egyptian Mamluk Sultanate, and in that case most of them boys, since the Mamluk sultanate needed a constant supply of slave soldiers. From at least 1382 onward, the majority of the mamluks of the Egyptian Mamluk sultanate with slave origin came from the Black Sea slave trade; around a hundred Circassian males intended for mamluks were being trafficked via the Black Sea slave trade until the 19th century.

During the 13th-century, Indian boys, women and girls intended for sexual slavery, were trafficked from India to Arabia and to Egypt across the Red Sea slave trade via Aden.

=== Slave market ===
The slave market were famously dominated by its most significant and influential category, military slavery. Other categories were the common for slavery in Muslim lands, with women used as sex slaves (harem concubines) and domestic slave maids.

Slavery died out in Western Europe after the 12th century, but the demand for laborers after the Black Death resulted in a revival of slavery in Southern Europe in Italy and in Spain, as well as an increase in the demand for slaves in Egypt.

The Italian (Genoese and Venetian) slave trade from the Black Sea had two main routes; from the Crimea to Byzantine Constantinople, and via Crete and the Balearic Islands to Italy and Spain; or to the Mamluk Sultanate in Egypt, which received the majority of the slaves.

In the late 14th century the normal price for an African slave-girl from Ethiopia was 300 dirham while the highest-valued slave-girls (normally a Greek) were sold for a price 550 dirham.

==== Female slaves ====
In parallel with the import of slave boys for the use of military slavery, slave girls were imported for usage as either concubines (sex slaves) or domestic servants, but the information about them are less documented. The customary sex segregation made it difficult for free Muslim women to work as domestic maidservants, and consequently, the Muslim world used slaves as domestic servants. While the documentation of female slaves are less than that of male Mamluk slaves during the Mamluk Sultanate, female slaves were in fact always more numerous than male slaves; especially in elite household, female slaves always outnumbered male, and slavery in the Mamluk Sultanate has therefore sometimes been referred to as a female phenomenon.

If a male enslaver chose to acknowledge the child he had with a female slave the child would become free and the mother became umm walad, which meant that she could no longer be sold and would be free upon the death of her enslaver; however, as long as he was alive, she would remain a slave and could still be sexually exploited by him, rented out for work, or manumitted and married.

==== Harem slavery ====
The harem of the Mamluk sultans was housed in the Cairo Citadel al-Hawsh in the capital of Cairo (1250–1517).

The Mamluk sultanate built upon the established model of the Abbasid harem, as did its predecessor the Fatimid harem. The mother of the sultan was the highest ranked woman of the harem. The consorts of the Sultans of the Bahri dynasty (1250–1382) were originally slave girls. The female slaves were supplied to the harem by the slave trade as children; they could be trained to perform as singers and dancers in the harem, and some were selected to serve as concubines (sex slaves) of the Sultan, who in some cases chose to marry them. Other slave girls served the consorts of the Sultan in a number of domestic tasks as harem servants, known as qahramana or qahramaniyya. The harem was guarded by enslaved eunuchs, until the 15th-century supplied by the Balkan slave trade and then from the Black Sea slave trade, served as the officials of the harem.

The harem of the Bahri Mamluk sultans were initially small and moderate, but Sultan Al-Nasir Muhammad (r. 1293–1341) expanded the harem to a major institution, which came to consummate as much luxury and slaves as the infamously luxurious harem of the preceding Fatimid dynasty. The harem of Sultan Al-Nasir Muhammad expanded to a larger size than any preceding Mamluk sultan, and he left a harem of 1,200 female slaves at his death, 505 of which were qiyan singing girls. He manumitted and married the slave Tughay (d. 1348), who left 1,000 slave girls and 80 eunuchs at her own death.

The harem played an influential part: the emir Arghun Al-alai, regent for sultan Al-Salih Ismail, married the sultan's mother to secure his power. Sultan As-Salih Salih (died 1354) gave his mother great influence: he arranged a royal banquet inside the royal harem, where he served her himself and organized a royal procession, a mawkib sultani, which was a ceremony otherwise customarily only given to sultans. Sultan Abu Bakr manumitted and married two of his slave girls, and the sultan al-Salih Ismail manumitted and married his slave concubine Ittifaq, who were later taken as wife by his brother and successor Al-Kamil Sha'ban, and finally by sultan al-Muzaffar.

During the Burji dynasty (1382–1517) the Mamluk Sultanate were no longer an inherited monarchy, and the Burji mamluk sultans were succeeded by their emirs. However, a certain dynastic continuity existed, in which the Sultans married the widow, concubine or female relative of his predecessor.

The Burji Mamluk often married free Muslim women of the Mamluk nobility. However, the Burji harem, as its predecessor, maintained the custom of slave concubinage, with Circassian slave girls being popular as concubines, some of which became favorites and even wives of the Sultan. Sultan Qaitbay (r. 1468–1496) had a favorite Circassian slave concubine, Aṣalbāy, who became the mother of Sultan Al-Nasir Muhammad (r. 1496–1498) and later married Sultan Al-Ashraf Janbalat (r. 1500–1501). Her daughter-in-law, Miṣirbāy (d. 1522), a former Circassian slave concubine, married in succession Sultan Al-Nasir Muhammad (r. 1496–1498), sultan Abu Sa'id Qansuh (r. 1498–1500), and in 1517 the Ottoman Governor Khā’ir Bek.

==== Male slaves ====
The most famous category of male slaves to the Mamluk Sultanate were the mamluk slave soldiers. However, the mamluk soldiers were elite slaves. Not all male slaves were mamluk soldiers, and the conditions of non-Mamluk male slaves were very different.

African male slaves were not used as slave soldiers, since they were only considered suitable for lowly domestic tasks, and the Turkish and Circassian mamluk slave soldiers are known to have used African male slaves to attend to their horses and perform menial tasks for them, such as transporting and serving their food.

The condition of a male slave could change under certain conditions. If certain terms were met, a male slave could be allowed to make a manumission contract; in that case, he would be allowed to work and keep the money he earned on his labor, though he would still not be allowed to do things such as testify, or to marry without the permission of his owner.

==== Military slavery ====
From 935 to 1250, Egypt was controlled by dynastic rulers, notably the Ikhshidids, Fatimids, and Ayyubids. Throughout these dynasties, thousands of Mamluk servants and guards continued to be used and even took high offices. The Mamluks were essentially enslaved mercenaries. The increasing level of influence among the Mamluk worried the Ayyubids in particular. Because Egyptian Mamluks were enslaved Christians, Islamic rulers did not believe they were true believers of Islam despite fighting for wars on behalf of Islam as slave soldiers.

In 1250, a Mamluk rose to become sultan. The Mamluk Sultanate survived in Egypt from 1250 until 1517, when Selim captured Cairo on 20 January. Although not in the same form as under the Sultanate, the Ottoman Empire retained the Mamluks as an Egyptian ruling class and the Mamluks and the Burji family succeeded in regaining much of their influence, but as vassals of the Ottomans.

The ruling Mamluks were not slaves, but former slaves. The Mamluks were sons of kafir (non-Muslim) parents from Dar al-harb (non-Muslim lands); they were bought as children, converted to Islam and brought up in military barracks where they were raised to become Muslim soldiers, during which they were raised, as slave children without families, to view the sultan as their father and the other mamluks as their brothers. Their education was finished by the kharj ceremony, during which they were manumitted and given a position in either the courtly administration or the army, and free to begin a career as a free ex-slave Mamluk. Mamluk slave soldiers were preferred to freeborn soldiers because they were raised to view the army and their sultan-ruler as their family and thus seen as more loyal than a freeborn soldier who would have a biological family to whom thei would have their first loyalty.

In the late 14th century, the ethnicity of the Mamluks shifted from Turkish to Circassian; when the Golden Horde considered the Islamization of Turkish Central Asia to be complete enough, Jani Beg banned the import of Turkish slaves to Egypt since they were no longer defined as kafir and thereby by Islamic law no longer legitimate for Muslims to enslave. After around 1400 therefore, Mamluk were normally of Circassian origin rather than Turkish, the Circassian being Pagan and Christian and thus as kafirs legitimate for enslavement.

=== Racial dimension of slavery ===
According to slavery in Islamic law, non-Muslim people from non-Muslim lands were legitimate to enslave by Muslims. There was thus no particular ethnicity targeted for slavery, but rather slaves of many different ethnicities. However, this did not exclude racism. Slaves were regarded to have different abilities depending on their ethnicity, and were seen as suitable for different tasks because of these stereotypes, which were described in various manuals and handbooks for slave traders and slave buyers of the time.

Skin color was ascribed certain abilities and classified in a system in which different races were attributed different traits depending on the color of their skin. In the Arab world, a mid skin tone was often preferred, since it was closer to the Arab skin color, while both darker and lighter skin colors were perceived as something negative. Slaves with a very light-skinned skin color were seen as vicious, evil, disloyal and untruthful; slaves of reddish-white skin color were praised as clever, intelligent, knowledgeable and with a trait for reason and wisdom. Those with brownish skin color were seen as brave, determined and fearless; however, people with full Black African skin color were seen as fearful, cowardly, ill-disposed, rash and more inclined to evil than good.

The author al-Amshati described the racial stereotypes of slaves depending on race extensively in his work. The most appreciated slave races in the market were Turkic people and Circassians, who were the two preferred races acquired for use as Mamluk soldiers. al-Amshati described Turks as a race of moderate temperament, sturdy in body, with a beautiful well-proportioned physique and gloomy of mien, and Turkish children as clean, healthy, clever, skillful and pretty; Turks from Khurasan were considered the best on the market. The next best race were the Circassians, who were stereotyped as braver than the Turks, "always ready strike first blow" and with excellent group solidarity, suitable for soldiers. However, they were haughty if untrained, lacked work ethic and the patience and perseverance necessary for long military campaigns, and required hard training. If given rigorous training, however, they could become both excellent soldiers as well as religious scholars.

Black Africans were seen as excellent slaves, suitable for lowly domestic labor. al-Amshati described "Abyssinians" (Africans) as physically weak slaves who often fall ill; however, they had a long number of traits suitable for slavery such as being of strong character, righteous, patient, obedient, intelligent, shrewd and prudent, and African women were thought to be particularly docile. However, Black children were described as sly, deceitful, malicious and thieving of character. African slaves were not considered suitable for arts such as singing and dancing, and were not used for Mamluk elite slavery, but mainly for lowly labor and domestic tasks. By the 14th century, a significant number of slaves came from sub-Saharan Africa, and racist attitudes occurred, exemplified by the Egyptian historian Al-Abshibi (1388–1446) writing that "[i]t is said that when the [black] slave is sated, he fornicates, when he is hungry, he steals."

Greek (rumi) male slaves were seen as obedient, serious, loyal, trustworthy, intelligent and parsimonious, with good manners and excellent knowledge of the sciences. Greek female slaves were characterized as impertinent, but still suited for household tasks.

The least popular slave races were Armenians and Europeans. They were not considered to be loyal and obedient slaves, but rather unwilling and defiant, and possessed of a number of traits making them hard to control for usage as slaves. Armenian slaves were described as strong and of good health and looks, but also as dishonest, lazy, greedy, unreliable, morose and of a character to neglect personal hygiene. They were said to be good for nothing but hard physical labor, and required frequent chastisement and punishment to obey. Light-skinned Franks (a term for Europeans) were, in the case of men, described as rough, courageous, miserly, stupid and uneducated, strongly religious, skilled in a number of manual tasks but not trustworthy slaves. Female Frankish (European) slaves were referred to as coarse, cruel and merciless if kept as slaves. Frankish (European) children, however, were popular and described as excellent slaves; courageous, slender and rosy-cheeked.

== Ottoman Egypt: 1517–1805 ==
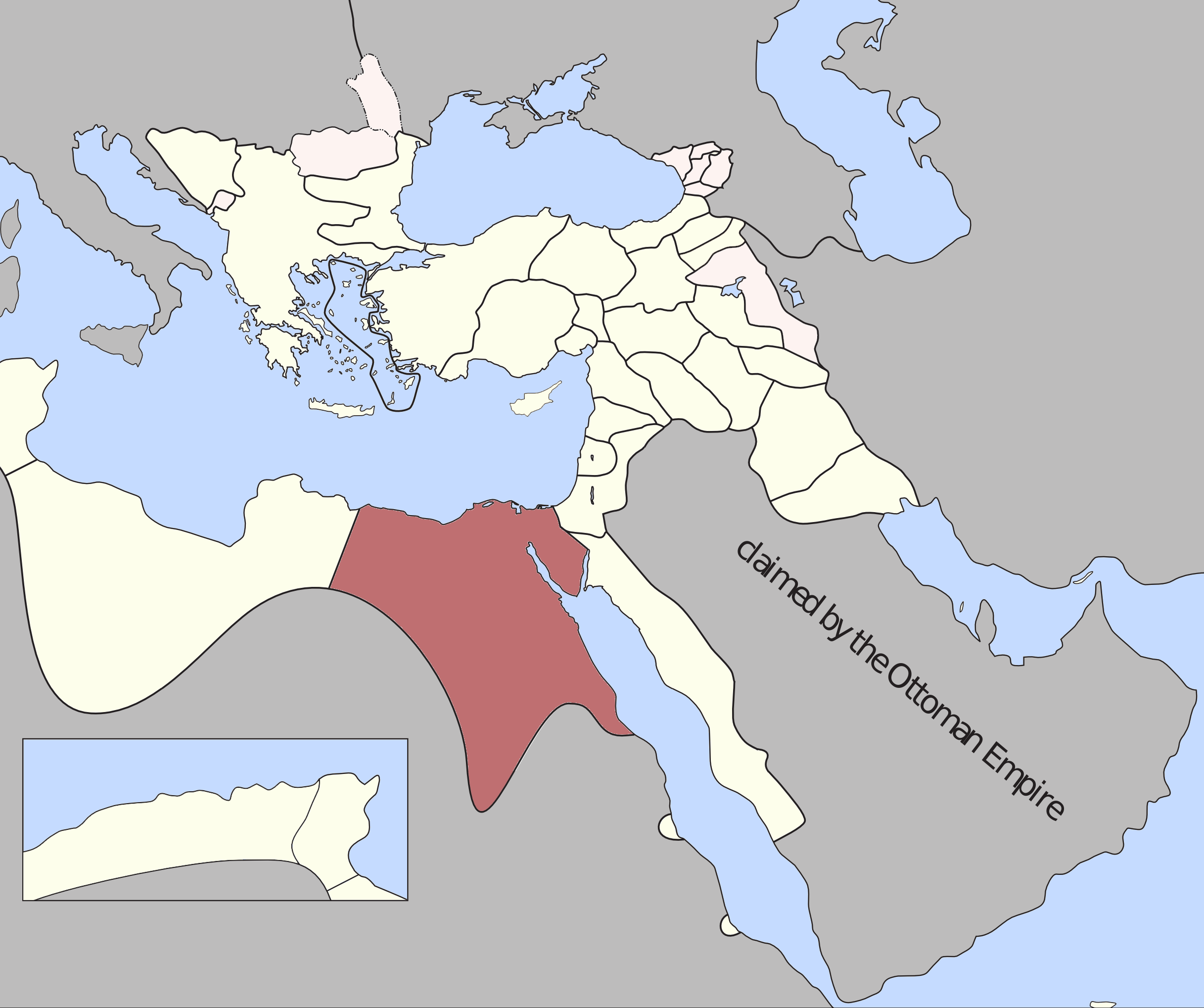
Egypt Eyalet, Ottoman Empire (1795)

The Mamluk Sultanate was conquered by the Ottoman Empire in 1517. Ottoman Egypt was ruled directly by the Ottoman Empire via Ottoman governors until 1805. Slavery in Ottoman Egypt mainly continued the same system established during the Mamluk Sultanate. White slaves were made in to Mamluk soldiers and their concubines and wives, while Black African slaves were used for domestic service and hard labor.

=== Slave trade ===
The slave trade to Ottoman Egypt followed already established routes. African slaves were provided via the ancient slave trade from the Sudan and the Trans-Saharan slave trade.

The Balkan slave trade was closed down, but the Black Sea slave trade continued, now managed no longer by Italian slave merchants but by the Crimean Khanate and the Ottoman Empire, known as the Crimean slave trade. Slaves trafficked from the Crimean slave trade could be sold far away in the Mediterranean and the Middle East; a Convent in Sinai in Egypt is for example noted to have bought a male slave originating from Kozlov in Russia.

=== Slave market ===
Egypt in the Ottoman period was still dominated by the Mamluk military slavery. Mamluk soldiers in this period were still often white slaves. While the old supply source of the Balkan slave trade had been closed, male Mamluk slaves were often Circassian or from Georgia, trafficked via the Crimean slave trade.

The Mamluk aristocrats, who were themselves often Circassian or from Georgia (trafficked via the Black Sea slave trade), preferred to marry women of similar ethnicity, while black slave women were used as domestic maids, and the majority of the wives and concubines of the Mamluk have been referred to as "white slaves". The white slave women bought to become concubines and wives of the Mamluks were often from the Caucasus (Circassians or Georgian) who were sold to slave traders by their poor parents.

It was common practice for the men of the Egyptian Mamluk upper class to marry a woman who had previously been the slave concubine of either themselves or another Mamluk, and the practice of marrying the concubine or the widow of another Mamluk were a way of normal Mamluk alliance policy. The marriage between Murad Bey and Nafisa al-Bayda, widow of Ali Bey al-Kabir, was an example of this marriage policy, similar to that of Shawikar Qadin, the concubine of Uthman Katkhuda (d. 1736), who were given in marriage by Abd al-Rahman Jawish to Ibrahum Katkhuda (d. 1754) after the death of Uthman Katkhuda.

There was a common excuse of slavery as benevolent, particularly in reference to women bought as slaves for sexual purposes as the concubines and wives in the sex segregated harems of rich men, which was excused as benevolent because the women came from poverty and were exploited by rich men in a wealthy environment. A lawyer in Ottoman Egypt in the 17th-century commented about the sexual slavery of women:

"What guilt is there for the man who takes the kidnapped from misery to happiness, from hunger to ease of life, replacing their ragged clothes with beautiful robes, supporting them with money, treating them with the kindness that both his religion and his sense of humanity dictate to him? [He] does not buy them for trade or for profit".

There was a racial hierarchy among slaves. Male laborers and eunuchs, and female domestic maids were provided via the Trans-Saharan slave trade and the Sudanese slave trade to Egypt.

== Muhammad Ali dynasty: 1805–1953 ==
Egypt became de facto independent during the Muhammad Ali dynasty (1805–1914). Slavery was still significant in Egypt during the 19th century.

The number of slaves in Egypt has been estimated to be at least 30,000 slaves at any time in the 19th century. In Egypt, the slave concubines in the harems of rich Egyptian men were often "Circiassian" (white) women provided via the Circassian slave trade, while the concubines of middle-class Egyptians were often "Abyssinian" (light brown from Ethiopia); while the male and female domestic slaves of almost all classes of Egyptian society often consisted of Black Africans. Black Africans were also used as slave soldiers as well as enslaved agricultural workers.

The slave trade to Egypt was abolished in two stages between 1877 and 1884. Slavery itself was not abolished, but gradually phased out after the ban of the slave trade, and appear to have died out by the 1930s.

=== Slave trade ===
The Egyptian slave dealers in Egypt were mainly from the Oases and from Upper Egypt. The slave traders were organized in a guild with a shaykh, and divided into dealers in black and white slaves respectively. Cairo was the main depot of slaves and the base of the slave trade, but the annual mawlid of Ṭanṭā was another important occasion for trading in slaves.

African slaves were trafficked to Egypt via several different routes: from Darfur to Asyūṭ; from Sennar to Isnā; from the area of the White Nile; from Bornu and Wadāy by way of Libya; and, finally, from Abyssinia and the East African by way of the Red Sea. Johann Burckhardt, a Swiss explorer, described the slave trade from Sudan to Egypt and the Arabian Peninsula during his travels to Egypt and Nubia (1814):

“It is falsely asserted by the caravan traders in Egypt, that it is a custom among them to respect the chastity of the handsomest female slaves; on the contrary, the traders do not observe the slightest decorum in their intercourse with the slave girls. During our journey to Souakin, where the caravan often encamped, on account of the apprehension of danger, in one large circle, I frequently witnessed scenes of the most shameless indecency, which the traders, who were the principal actors, only laughed at. I may venture to state whatever may be the opinion at Cairo, that very few female slaves who have passed their tenth year, reach Egypt or Arabia in a state of virginity.”

White slaves were trafficked to Egypt from the Black Sea area by way of Istanbul, the old Circassian slave trade continuing from the Black Sea. Most slaves in this time period were either women (who could be either white or black) or black men, while white male slaves became rare during the 19th century: as late as the 1870s, however, rich beys and pashas still purchased white slave boys to become playmates for their sons.

The Islamic custom of enslaving kafir (non-Muslim) war prisoners from Dar al-Harb was still practiced. After the Alexandria expedition of 1807, 400 British prisoners of war captured by Egyptian forces under Muhammad Ali Pasha were marched into Cairo and were either condemned to hard labor or sold into slavery. Colonel Dravetti, now advising Muhammad Ali in Cairo, persuaded the ruler to release the British prisoners of war as a gesture of goodwill, sparing them the (in the Islamic culture) usual fate of becoming slaves to their captors.

Throughout the 19th century, east African slaves, mainly Oromo (Galla), also made their way to Egypt. Edward William Lane writes that many Egyptians had long maintained a custom of keeping Oromo female slaves instead of marrying local women, which he claimed led to a darkening of their complexion over time. According to him, Oromo slave-girls were preferred for concubinage, while other 'black' slaves did household chores.

=== Slave market ===
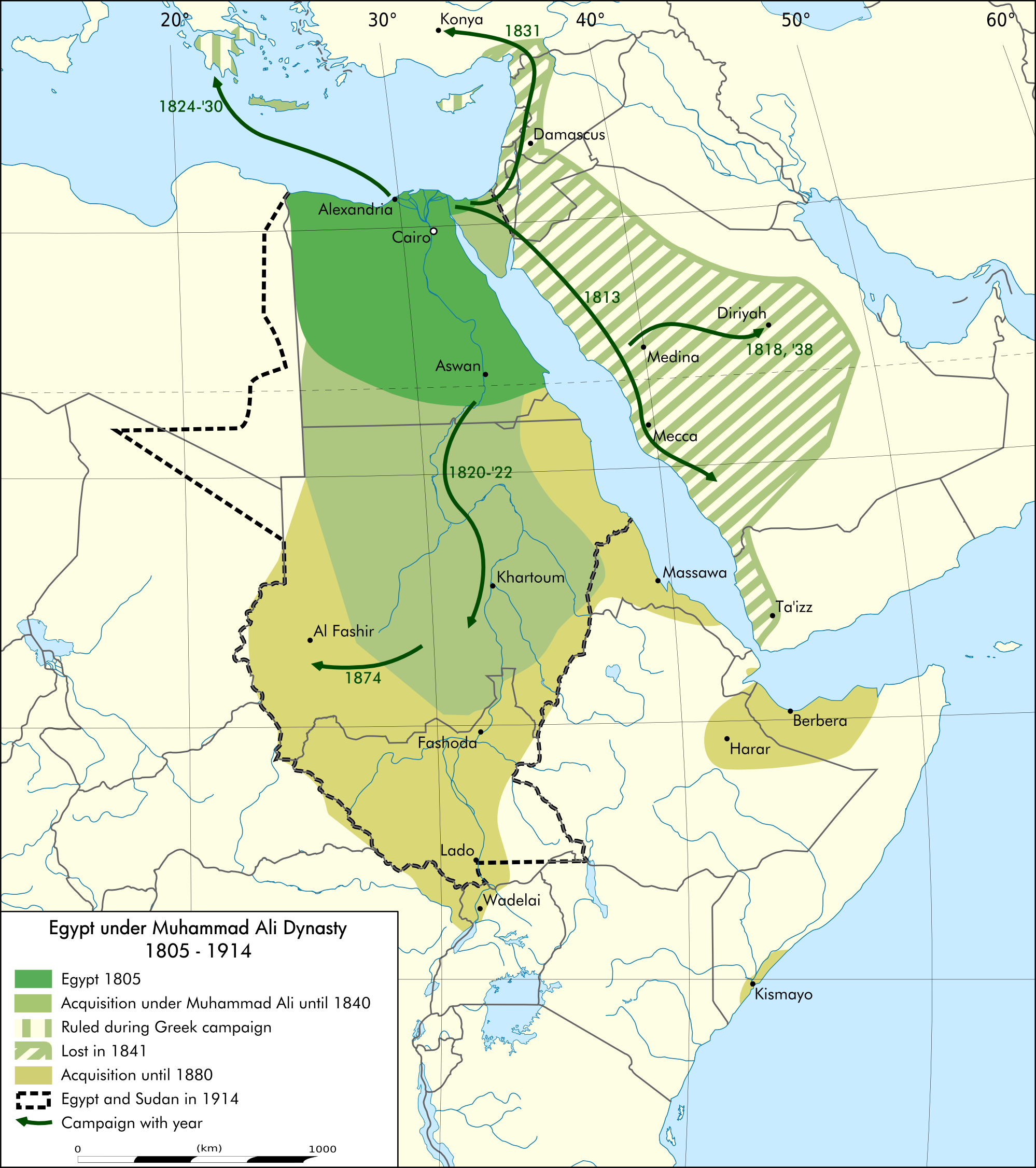
Expansion of Egypt under Muhammed Ali Dynasty, 1805-1880

Military slavery, for centuries a major use for male slaves, continued to be a main category for the Egyptian slave market until the mid-19th century. The domestic or harem sector continued to be a main destination for female slaves and eunuchs. A market for agricultural slaves expanded significantly during the 19th century.

In the 19th century, the supply sources for slaves to Egypt became fewer, and the ethnicity of slaves came to be largely reduced to African slaves, with the exception of a small luxury import of Circassian slave girls.

==== Agricultural slavery ====
The use of Sudanese in agriculture become fairly common under Muhammad Ali of Egypt and his successors. Agricultural slavery was virtually unknown in Egypt at this time, but the rapid expansion of extensive farming under Muhammad Ali and later, the world surge in the price of cotton caused by the American Civil War, were factors creating conditions favourable to the deployment of unfree labour. The slaves worked primarily on estates owned by Muhammad Ali and members of his family, and it was estimated in 1869, that Khedive Isma'il and his family had 2,000 to 3,000 slaves on their main estates as well as hundreds more in their sugar plantations in Upper Egypt.

==== Harem slavery ====
The royal harem of the Muhammad Ali dynasty of the Khedivate of Egypt (1805–1914) was modelled after Ottoman example, the khedives being the Egyptian viceroys of the Ottoman sultans.

Muhammad Ali was appointed vice roy of Egypt in 1805, and by Imperial Ottoman example assembled a harem of slave concubines in the Palace Citadel of Cairo which, according to a traditional account, made his legal wife Amina Hanim declare herself to henceforth be his wife in name only, when she joined him in Egypt in 1808 and discovered his sex slaves.

Similar to the Ottoman Imperial harem, the harem of the khedive was modelled on a system of polygyny based on slave concubinage, in which each wife or concubine was limited to having one son. The women harem slaves mostly came from Caucasus via the Circassian slave trade and were referred to as "white". Oromo women were also common in the harems of Egypt. German ethnographer Friedrich Ratzel (1897) stated that Oromo women were highly sought after in the harems of Egypt.

The khedive's harem was composed of between several hundreds to over a thousand enslaved women, supervised by his mother, the walida pasha, and his four official wives (hanim) and recognized concubines (qadin). However, the majority of the slave women served as domestics to his mother and wives, and could have servant offices such as the bash qalfa, chief servant slave woman of the walida pasha. The enslaved female servants of the khedivate harem were manumitted and married off with a trousseau in strategic marriages to the male freedmen or slaves (kul or mamluk) who were trained to become officers and civil servants as freedmen, in order to ensure the fidelity of their husband's to the khedive when they began their military or state official career. A minority of the slave women were selected to become the personal servants (concubines) of the khedive, often selected by his mother: they could become his wives, and would become free as an umm walad (or mustawlada) if they had children with their enslaver. Muhammad Ali of Egypt reportedly had at least 25 consorts (wives and concubines), and Khedive Ismail fourteen consorts of slave origin, four of whom were his wives.

The Egyptian elite of bureaucrat families, who emulated the khedive, had similar harem customs, and it was noted that it was common for Egyptian upper-class families to have slave women in their harem, which they manumitted to marry off to male protegees.

This system slowly and gradually started to change after 1873, when Tewfik Pasha married Emina Ilhamy as his sole consort, making monogamy the fashionable ideal among the elite, after the throne succession had been changed to primogeniture, which favored monogamy. The wedding of Tewfik Pasha and Emina Ilhamy was the first wedding of a prince that were celebrated, since the princes had previously merely taken slave concubines, who they sometimes married afterward. The end of the Circassian slave trade and the elimination of slave concubinage after the Anglo-Egyptian Slave Trade Convention also contributed to the end of the practice of polygyny in the Egyptian and Ottoman upper classes from the 1870s onward. In the mid-19th century, the Ottoman Tanzimat reforms abolished the custom of training male slaves to become military men and civil servants, and replaced them with free students.

==== Military slavery ====
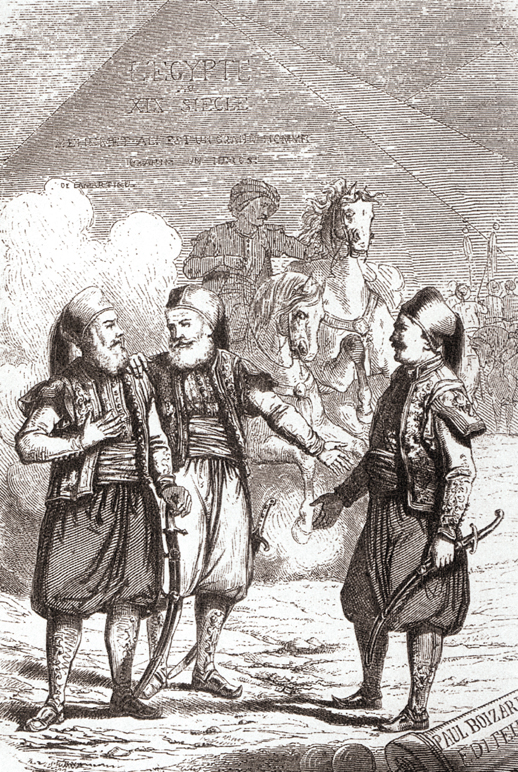
Muhammad Ali of Egypt with his son Ibrahim Pasha and Colonel Sève

To prepare for the training of his Sudanese slave army, Muhammad Ali sent a corps of Mamluks to Aswan, where, in 1820, he had new barracks built to house them. The head of the military academy at Aswan was a French officer who had served under Napoleon, Colonel Octave-Joseph Anthelme Sève, who became a Muslim and is known in Egyptian history as Sulayman Pasha al-Faransawi. When they arrived in Aswan, each of the Sudanese was vaccinated and given a calico vest, then instructed in Islam. The exact numbers of Sudanese brought to Aswan and Muhammad Ali's other military training centre at Manfalut is not known, but it is certain that a great number died en route. Of those who arrived, many died of fevers, chills and the dryness of the climate. Of an estimated 30,000 Sudanese brought to Aswan in 1822 and 1823, only 3,000 survived.

After 1823, Muhammad Ali's priority was to reduce the cost of garrisoning Sudan, where 10,000 Egyptian infantry and 9,000 cavalries were committed. The Egyptians made increasing use of enslaved Sudanese soldiers to maintain their rule, and relied very heavily on them. A more or less official ratio was established, requiring that Sudan provide 3,000 slaves for every 1,000 soldiers sent to subjugate it. This ratio could not be achieved however because the death rate of slaves delivered to Aswan was so high. Muhammad Ali's Turkish and Albanian troops who partook in the Sudan campaign were not used to the weather conditions of the area and attained fevers and dysentery while there, with tensions emerging and demands to return to Egypt. In addition the difficulties of capturing and raising an army from Sudanese male slaves during the campaign were reasons that led Muhammad Ali toward eventually recruiting local Egyptians for his armed forces.

=== Abolition and aftermath ===
The Ottoman Empire granted Egypt the status of an autonomous vassal state or Khedivate in 1867. Isma'il Pasha (Khedive from 1863 to 1879) and Tewfik Pasha (Khedive from 1879 to 1892) governed Egypt as a quasi-independent state under Ottoman suzerainty until the British occupation of 1882, after which it came under British influence. The British initiated an anti-slavery campaign and led policy changes regarding slavery in Egypt.

The Anglo-Egyptian Slave Trade Convention or Anglo-Egyptian Convention for the Abolition of Slavery in 1877 officially banned the slave trade to Sudan, thus formally putting an end on the import of slaves from Sudan. Sudan was at this time the main provider of male slaves to Egypt. This ban was followed in 1884 by a ban on the import of white women; this law was directed against the importation of white women, mainly from Caucasus and usually Circassians via the Circassian slave trade, who were the preferred choice for harem concubines among the Egyptian upper class. The importation of male slaves from Sudan as soldiers, civil servants and eunuchs, and the importation of female slaves from Caucasus as harem women were the two main sources of slave imports to Egypt, thus these laws were, at least on paper, major blows on slavery in Egypt. Slavery as such was not banned, only the importation of slaves. However a ban on the sale of existing slaves was introduced alongside a law giving existing slaves the legal right to apply for manumission at the British Consulate or at four Manumission Bureaus established in different parts of the country, and thousands of slaves used the opportunity. British abolitionists in Egypt opened a home for former female slaves to assist them and protect them from falling victim to prostitution in Egypt, which was in operation from 1884 until 1908.

The abolition of the slave trade in to Egypt contributed to the outbreak of the Mahdist war in Sudan (1881–1899), since the slave trade to Egypt was one of the main sources of income in Sudan at the time.

While slavery as such was not banned, the effect of the reforms in practice phased out slavery during the following decades. By the early 20th-century, slavery in Egypt was no longer common enough to be visible or the target of Western criticism. In 1901 a French observer shared his impression that slavery in Egypt was over "in fact and in law"; the Egyptian census of 1907 no longer listed any slaves, and in 1911 the Repression of Slave Trade Departments were closed and transferred to Sudan.

The anti-slavery reforms gradually diminished the Khedive harem, though the harem of the Khedive as well as the harems of the elite families still maintained a smaller number of male eunuchs and slave women until at least World War I. Khedive Abbas II of Egypt is noted to have bought six "white female slaves" for his harem in 1894, ten years after this had formally been banned, and his mother still maintained sixty slaves as late as 1931.

In 1922, Rashid Rida, editor of the progressive Egyptian newspaper al-Manar, condemned the purchase of Chinese slave girls for concubinage and said that it should not be seen as legitimate.

In the 1930s, Egypt answered the Advisory Committee of Experts on Slavery (ACE) of the League of Nations, who conducted a global slavery investigation in 1934–1939, that there was no longer any slavery in Egypt, and that no new slaves could be imported via the ongoing Red Sea slave trade, since they policed the waters of the Red Sea outside Egypt, preventing any import of slaves via the Red Sea coast.

== Gallery ==
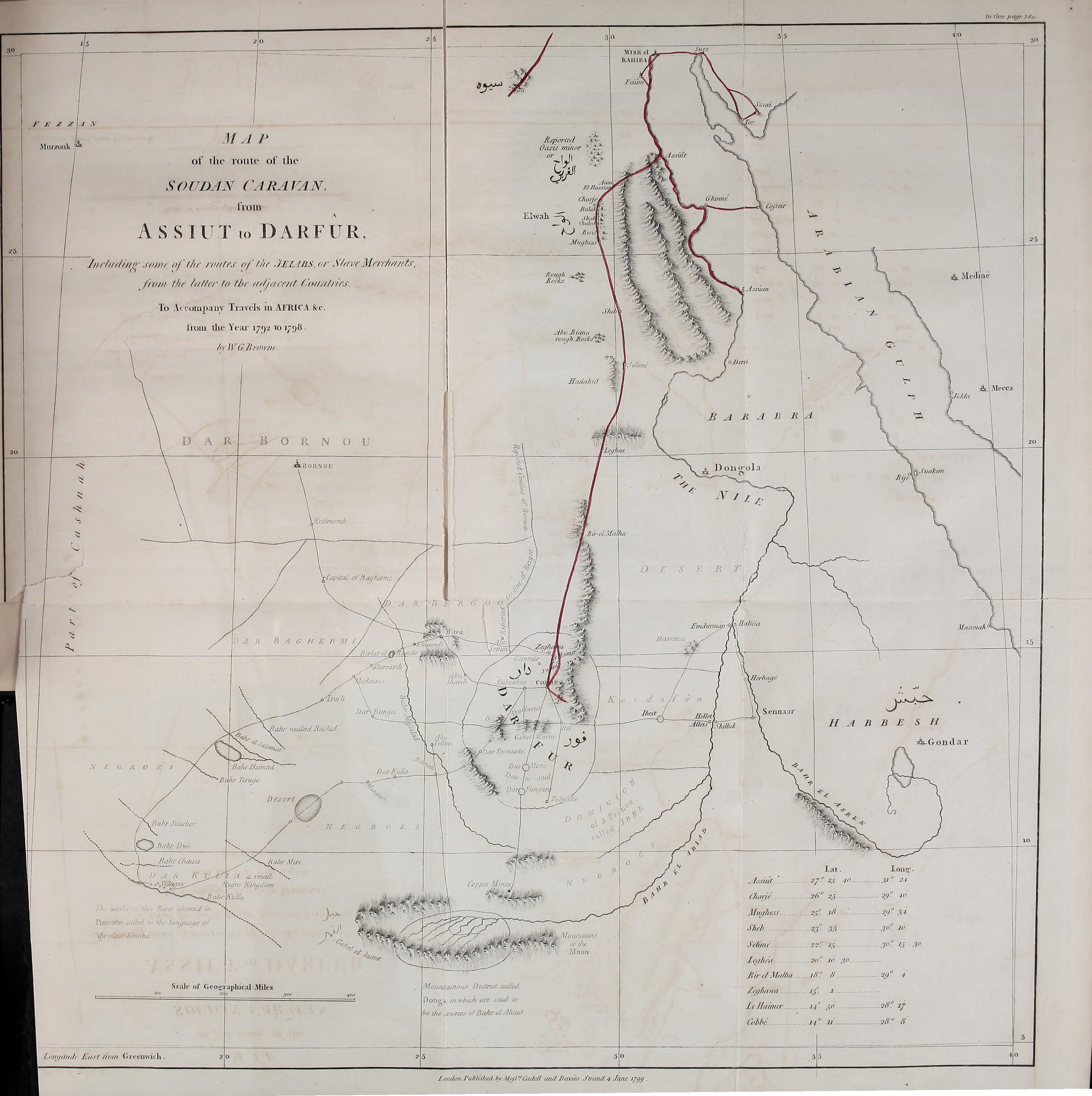
Englishman William George Browne rode with the Darb Al Arbain caravan in the 1790s; it delivered "Slaves, male and female" to Egypt

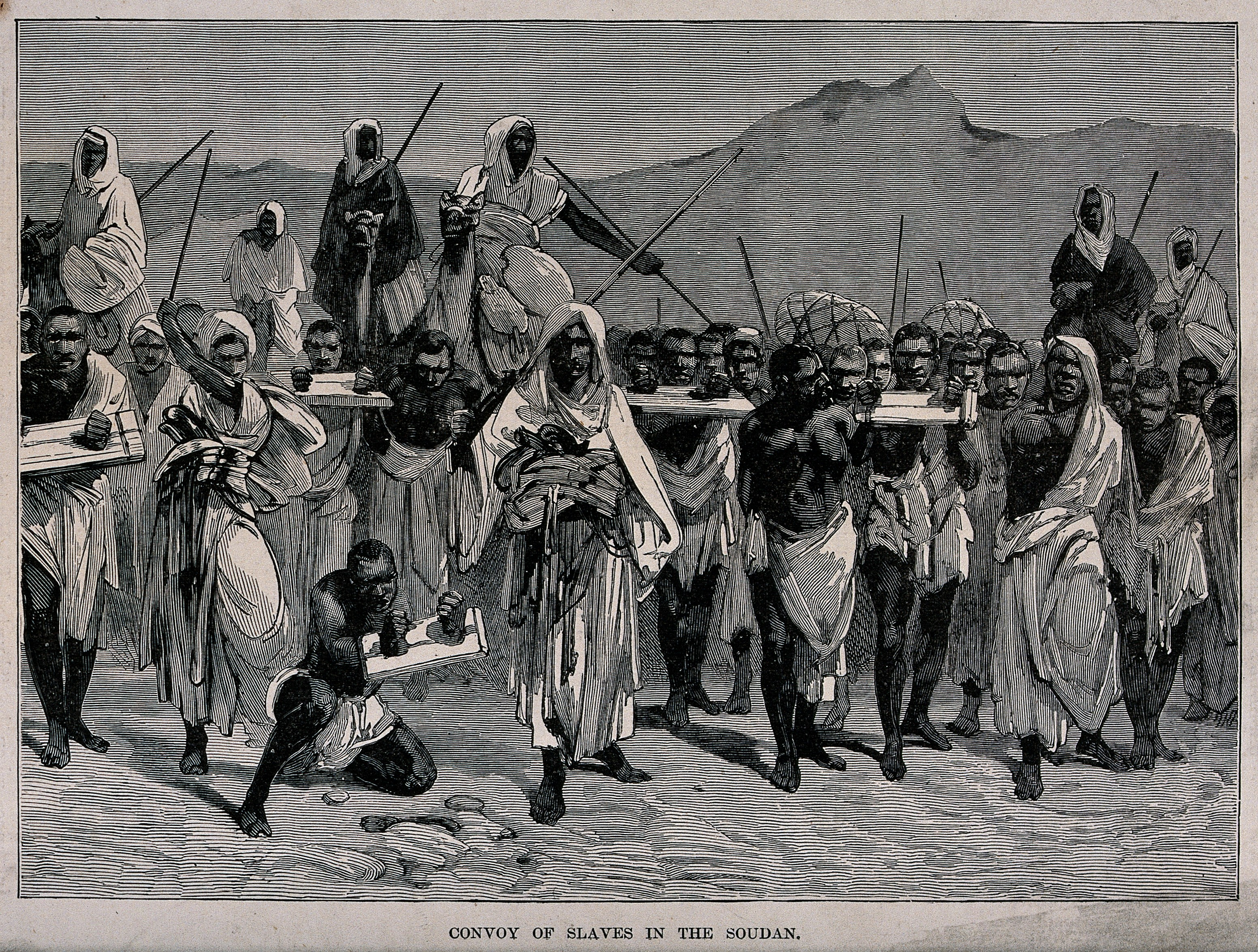
A depiction of slaves being transported across the Sahara Desert

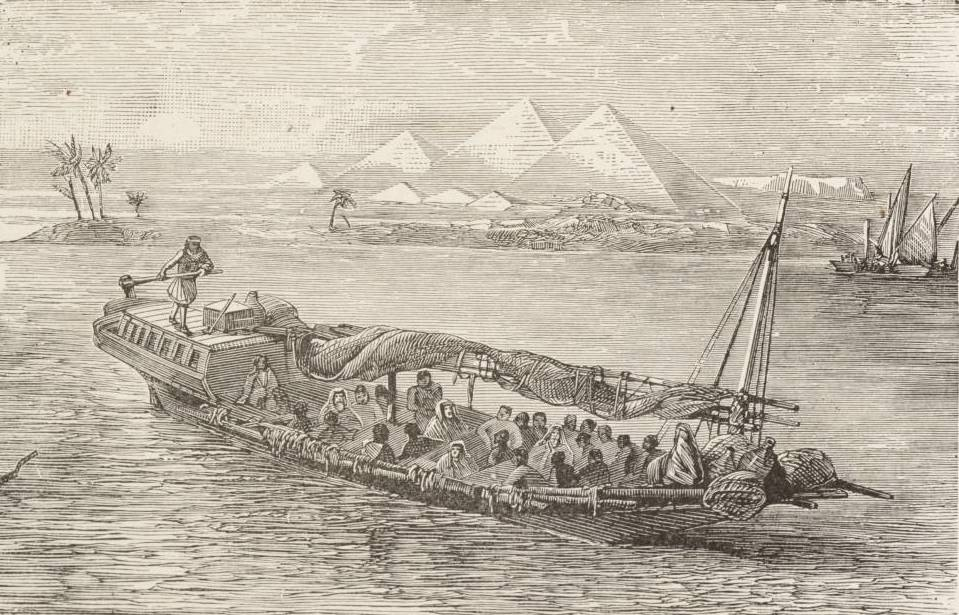
Modern Slave Boat on the Nile (1884)

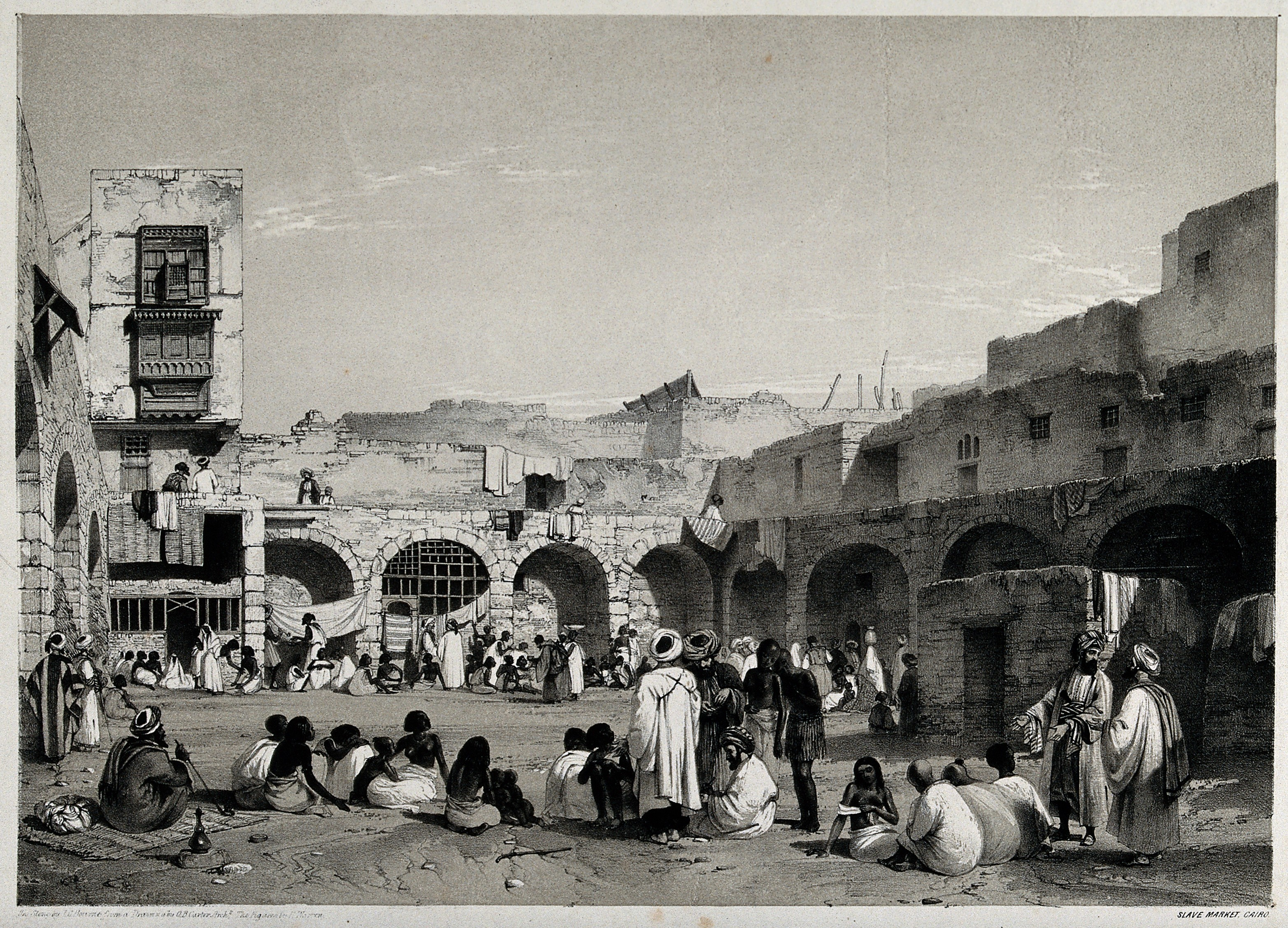
The slave market in Cairo. Wellcome V0050649

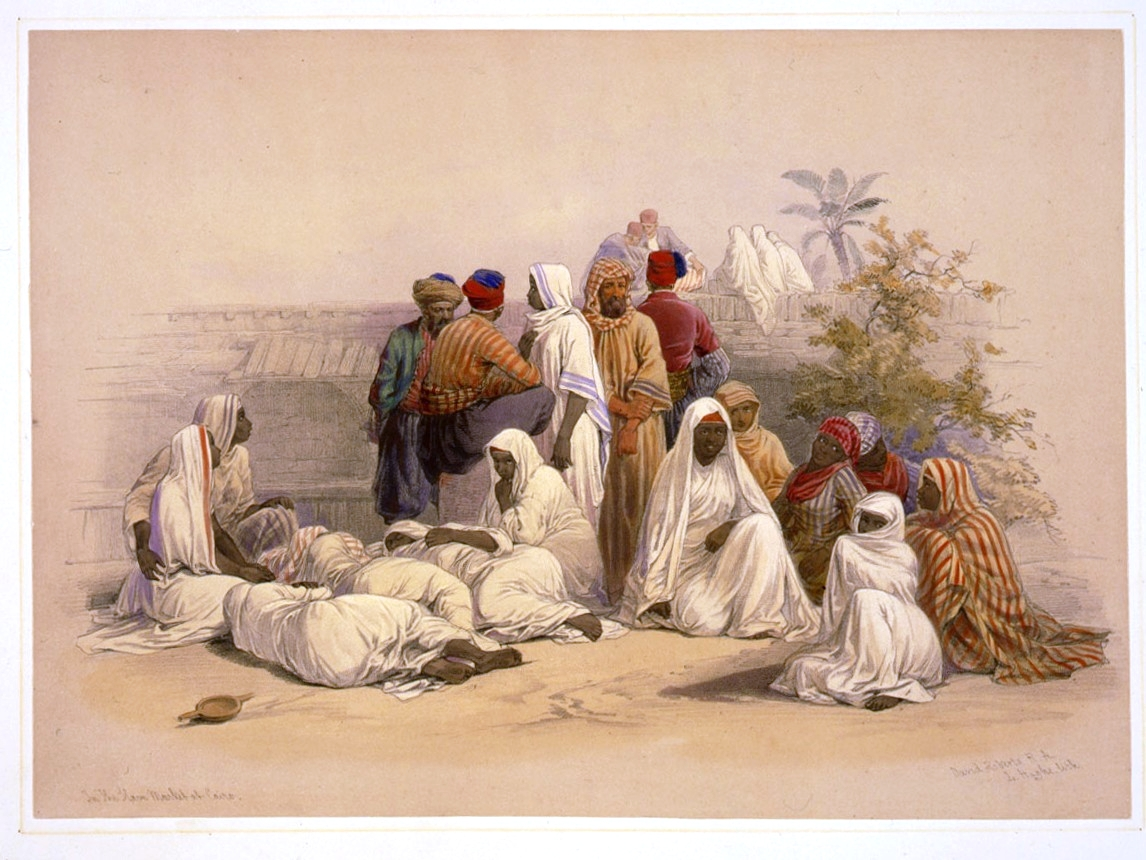
A slave market in Cairo. Drawing by David Roberts, circa 1848.

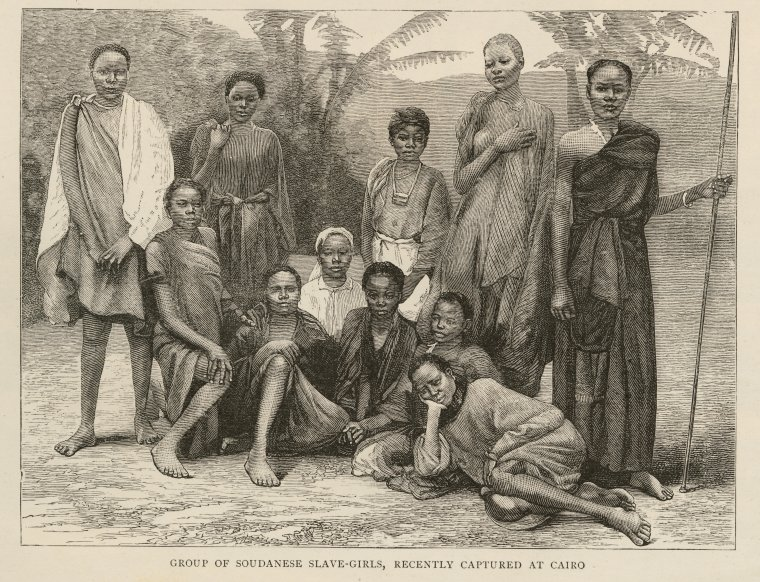
Group of Soudanese slave-girls, recently captured at Cairo

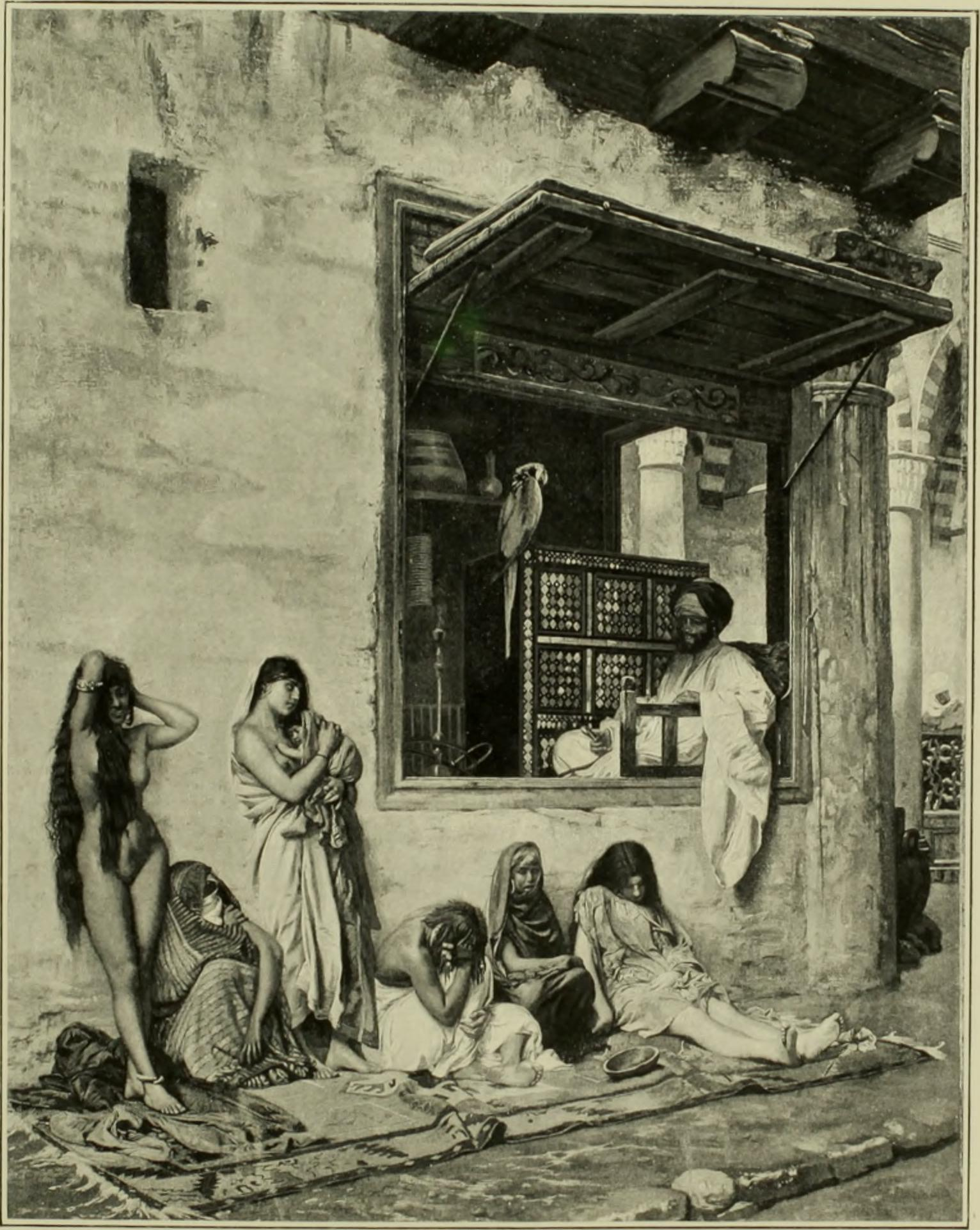
Gérôme - the life and works of Jean Léon Gérôme (1892) (14740175136)

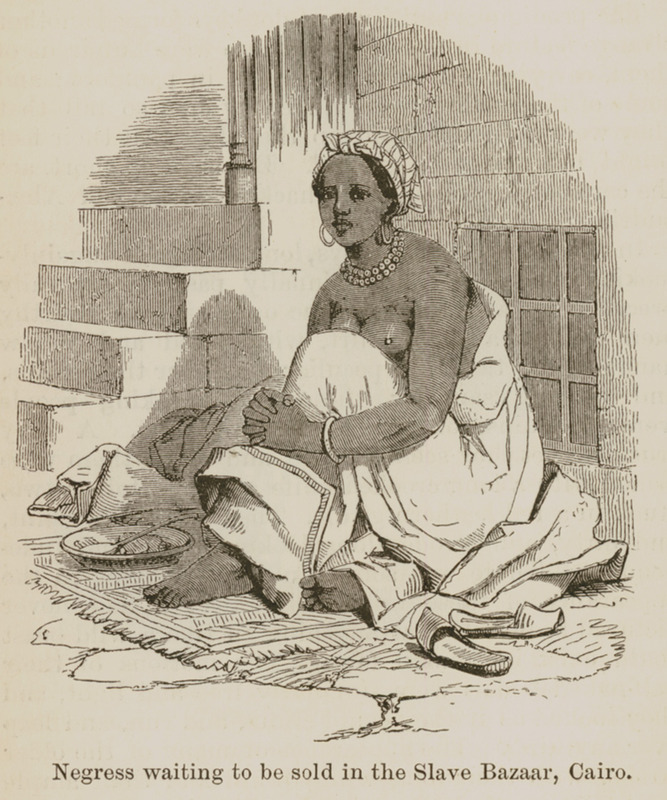
Negress waiting to be sold in the Slave Bazaar, Cairo - Curzon Robert - 1849

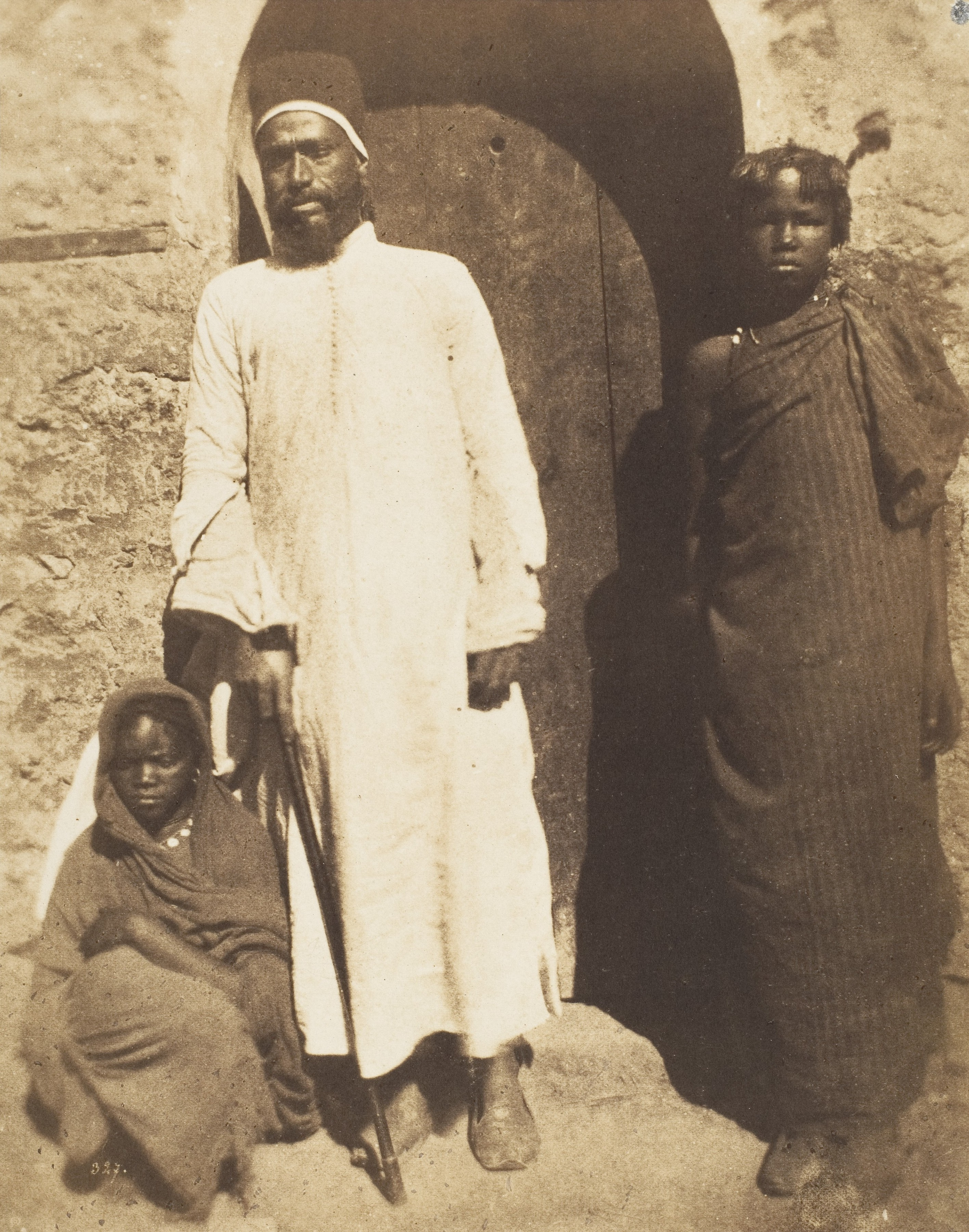
Abu Nabut and Negro Slaves in Cairo

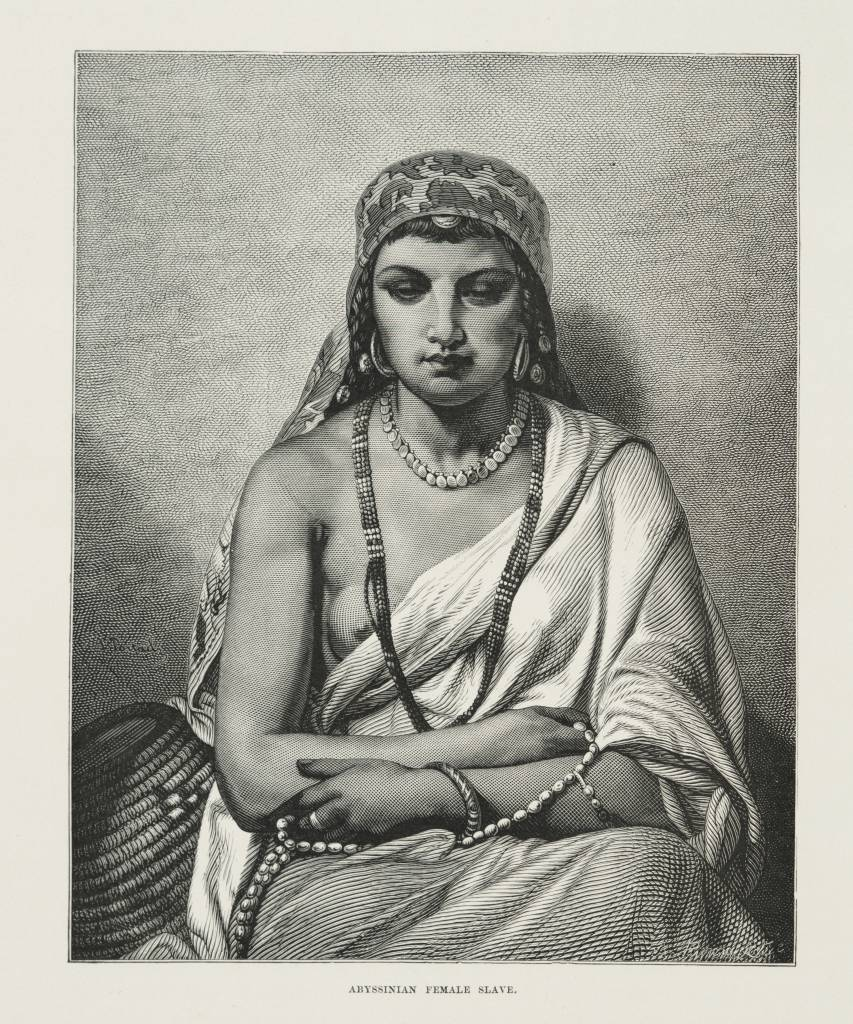
Abyssinian Female Slave (1878) - TIMEA

== See also ==
- That Most Precious Merchandise: The Mediterranean Trade in Black Sea Slaves, 1260-1500
- Human trafficking in Egypt

== Sources ==
- Fahmy, Khaled (2002). All the Pasha's men: Mehmed Ali, his army and the making of modern Egypt. The American University in Cairo Press. p. 89. ISBN 978-9774246968.
- Flint, John E. (28 January 1977). The Cambridge History of Africa. Vol. 5. Cambridge University Press. ISBN 978-0521207010.
- Mowafi, Reda (1 March 1985). Slavery, Slave Trade and Abolition Attempts in Egypt and the Sudan 1820-1882. Humanities Press. ISBN 978-9124313494.
