= Wagh El Birket =

Wagh El Birket وجه البركة
- Entertainment district
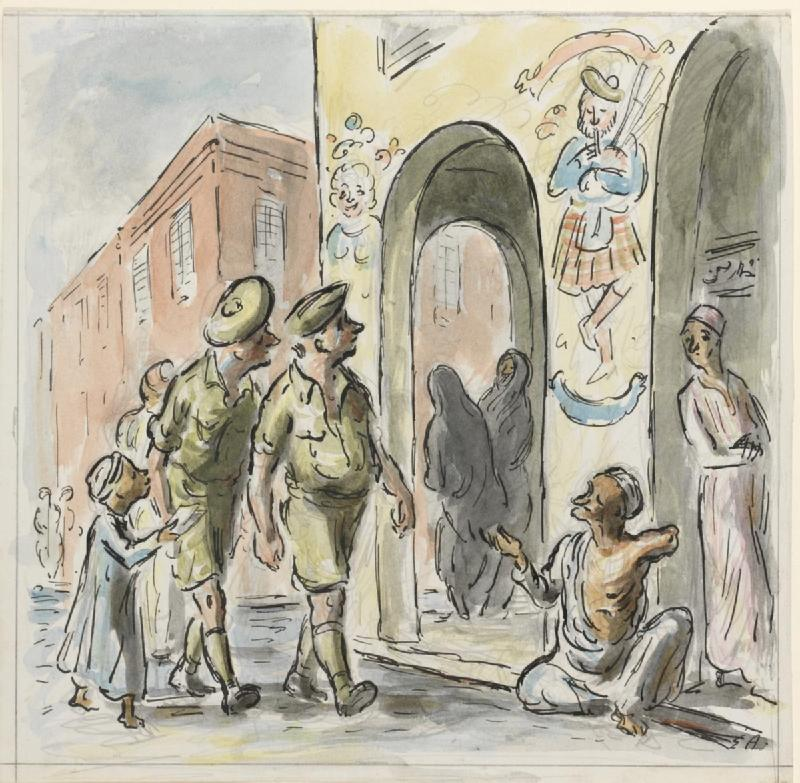
- Troops in the Birka, 1942 cartoon
- Nickname: The Berka (WWII)
- Country: Egypt
- City: Cairo

Wagh El Birket (Arabic: وجه البركة lit. 'the face of the blessing') (Note: Here it is pronounced with the "g" and the "h" separate.) was, through the first half of the 20th century, the entertainment district (or red-light district) of Cairo, Egypt. The lake was where Azbakeya is now.

== Events ==
In the 19th century, as Cairo expanded, Wagh El Birket developed as a contact zone between the wealthy area around the Azbakeya Lake and the expanding central Cairo. The street ran from the Hotel Bristol to Clot Bey Square.

In 1911, the street was described as "the most unblushing in Cairo". On one side was an arcade with cafes underneath. On the other were houses with balconies on the upper floors. "Ladies of the night" dressed in flimsy gowns would display themselves on the balconies. Towards the Clot Bey end was the Fishmarket, a particularly squalid area.

=== WWI ===
In World War I, there were violent incidents in the Wagh El Birket, including the major incident known as the Battle of the Wazzir.

=== WWII ===
During the Second World War, the street was known as "the Berka" by troops. The military set up brothels on the street, which Medical Corps controlled. Medical centres, officially known as PA centres (preventative ablution), to try and prevent servicemen catching STI were set up in the area, and the army medical services oversaw the regular check-ups of prostitutes which were carried out by civilian authorities. The street had warning signs of a cross on a white background at both ends.

After two Australian soldiers were killed on the street, the authorities closed the Berka down in May 1942. Some of the troops blamed General Bernard Montgomery for the closure as he had a reputation as a Puritan.

== Fiction ==
The Wagh El Birket features prominently in several novels by Egyptian author Naguib Mahfouz, particularly the Cairo Trilogy.
