= Battle of the Wazzir =

Riot in Cairo, Egypt caused by Australian and New Zealand soldiers

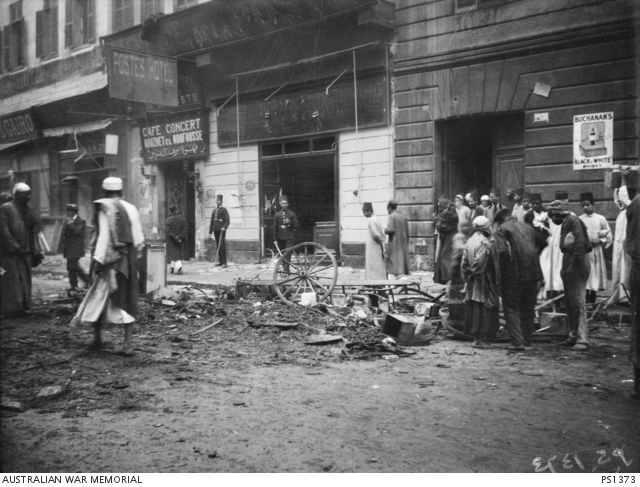
Damaged buildings in Cairo, possibly the aftermath of the riot

The Battle of the Wazzir, also known as Good Friday, was the name given to several riots of Australian, British and New Zealand troops in Cairo, Egypt, during World War I. The main incident occurred on 2 April 1915, but a smaller incident also took place on 31 July that year. In the aftermath of the war, another incident took place in February 1919.

== Major riot (2 April 1915) ==
The main riot took place on 2 April 1915. The riot took hold in a street called "Haret el Wasser", part of the Wagh El Birket area of Cairo where there were a large number of brothels and drinking establishments. At its peak about 2,500 Australian and New Zealand soldiers were involved, many of whom were intoxicated. The soldiers were reported to have had an assortment of complaints, including recent price increases, poor quality drinks, and concerns about the spread of venereal disease. The riot resulted in considerable damage – estimated at several hundred pounds worth – to several brothels which were set on fire; firefighters who responded to the blaze were also accosted. In response, mounted police were dispatched, as well as yeomanry, Lancashire Territorials and military police.

As 2 April 1915 was Good Friday, many ANZAC troops waiting to go to the Gallipoli Campaign were on leave, and many of them went to the Birka. They had an accumulation of grievances against the entertainments in the Birka: beer adulterated with water or even urine; high prices; much venereal disease among the area's prostitutes; theft and general dishonesty; an incident when an English soldier from Manchester found his sister serving as a nude dancer and prostitute there (she had accepted an offer for a job in domestic service, but her purported employer took her to Cairo and left her there: see white slave trade), and when he tried to take her away, the brothel's staff threw him out of an upstairs window. About 4000 troops rioted and wrecked and burnt many buildings, and threw prostitutes and pimps out onto the streets and their possessions after them; furniture including a piano was thrown out of upstairs windows; and they rescued the English soldier's sister. The riot started about 4 pm or 5 pm and ended by 10 pm.

A view at the time, that the wanton destruction and assaults were just ‘a bit Of fun’, has persisted, despite evidence of the seriousness of the criminal behaviour during the event.

Australian soldier Eric Ward wrote:

On April 2nd the day before leaving Mena I went to Cairo on leave. The greatest bit of fun since we have been in Egypt took place in the notorious Wasser. About 5 o'clock a disturbance started through a native & a soldier & developed into a riot by night. The house in which it started was stripped of all its furniture & a bonfire was started in the middle of the street which was kept going up to 9 p.m. Beds, chairs, shutters &c. were piled on the fire. The trouble started through the Red Caps firing on the crowd. They then became furious & wrecked every shop & house in the vicinity & carried off tobacco, cigarettes & drink galore. One woman's house was set on fire…. Not a pane of glass remained intact.

Early in 1915 the noted Australian World War 1 historian C.E.W. Bean had expressed concern at the behaviour of some Australian soldiers

At the same time matters were swiftly coming to a point when discipline in the A.I.F. must either be upheld or abandoned. Besides the high spirit of the troops there existed a very different cause of trouble. A much graver class of crime was appearing--heavy drinking, desertion, attacks upon natives, in some instances robbery

In fact 322 soldiers were sent back to Australia for various reasons including disciplinary. Surprisingly Bean wrote that the two Wasser riots while ‘not heroic’, ‘differed very little from what at Oxford and Cambridge and in Australian universities is known as a "rag".

Even a recently as 2015, a blog written for the Australian War Memorial on the centenary of the incident describes it as

Some highly spirited Anzacs participated in the Good Friday rampage, while others cheered or hid. The 'spirit of the Anzacs' started well before the landing at Gallipoli on 25 April 1915.

Private Victor Laidlaw, of the 2nd Field Ambulance, found the event rather more disturbing and in his account he described a 'disgraceful occurrence':

Today we had our weekly holiday, but it will be a day I shall remember for the rest of my life as a disgraceful occurrence was enacted in Cairo in the evening. Of course you know that in every large city there are bad quarters mostly frequented by women, well the quarter in Cairo is known as the "Wassa", well a couple of soldiers were in one of these houses and when they were coming out they found that they had been robbed of their money, naturally they resented this and they tried to get again into the house,- but they found that it was locked, well this small occurrence started a riot. The soldiers, collected together and started to raid these houses one after the other, they threw the furniture out of the windows and then made a huge bonfire in the centre of the road, they then set fire to the houses, there were not more than 18 soldiers taking part in it, they were Australian, New Zealand and British, some time later the fire brigade arrived and to make a way they turned the house on the tremendous crowd that had gathered by this time. Well this action only made matters worse as the soldiers hacked the hose to pieces with their knives, just at that moment some mounted native police arrived and started firing on the crowd with the result that two soldiers were killed and a good number injured, the action of the native police in firing was very foolish and they had no orders to do so, however the news got round very soon and not long after a squadron of Light Horse arrived and restored order there must have been an awful lot of damage done to property, this affair is to be regretted as it only makes other people form a very bad opinion of us, the papers have kept silent so far, but you can reckon things being true when they are seen with one’s own eyes, in a very short time all the soldiers were told to go to camp and they did this without a murmur, thus ended the most exciting day since we have been in Egypt but unhappily some lives have been lost.

The most balanced and reliable account comes from historian Graham Wilson who has studied the event in detail. His view is that: "The truth, however, is far more sordid, far less heroic and righteous, and casts absolutely no credit whatsoever on the AIF." He identifies that the Court of Inquiry (convened 3 April 1915) "found that the riot grew out of an incident arising from two or three disgruntled Australians trying to extort money from some prostitutes who they said had given them VD."

According to Australian Trooper James Brownhill, the men had their leave cut which was a significant punishment. He wrote home on 12 April 1915 giving his view of the riot:

Last week there was a bit of a disturbance in Cairo, which has had a very bad effect on us, for the authorities have cut our leave short, and now only about ten per cent are allowed on leave at a time, which hurts rather, after the liberal leave we were allowed previously. The cause of the trouble in Cairo is not known for certain, but I understand that a couple of our men were found in a house, in a much damaged condition, as a result of being severely handled by some Arabs. A rush of soldiers soon took place to the scene, and the doors being smashed in, the crowd set to work heaving the furniture out — the only revenge left them, as the occupants had fled through the roof, and away over the neighbouring houses. The military mounted police, called "Red Caps", came on the scene, but as they are very unpopular, they served as a red rag to a bull, for the mob rushed them, and drove them back out of the street in the meantime the mob set fire to the house, and continued pouring furniture out of every house in the crowded street.

== Riot of 31 July 1915 ==
A second incident occurred on 31 July 1915, which was subsequently described as the "Second Battle of the Wazzir".

== Incidents of February 1919 ==
In February 1919, the Auckland Star recounted another incident, following the armistice:

Several thousand Tommies took Cairo by storm, and there was looting far and wide. Many shrewd attempts were made to entice the Aussies into the mob, but they were not biting. Not content with stuffing bags with spoil, the maffickers passed on the Anzac Hotel, making a wreck of that institution, though it has been almost entirely a Tommy concern since the Australian infantry's departure, and has provided them with the only lodging within their means, together with the cheapest good quality meals. A descent was also made on the Australian and Maorilander Soldiers' club, and one small patch of Aussies left us, but a few willing Diggers soon settled that argument. The G.O.C troops in Egypt has issued a public proclamation thanking the Australians and Maorilanders for their strong support in limiting and quelling the outbreak. Since certain still-not-to-be-mentioned proceedings at the Wazzir, retaliation for numerous murders and fatal doping, the Australians have had mud thrown at them on every possible occasion. Just as frequently they have been told to take an example from the disciplined Tommy. Now those dabblers in pitch are floundering in their own defilement.

— Auckland Star, Auckland Star, 27 February 1919, p. 4 & Poverty Bay Herald, 7 March 1919, p. 6
