= Manfredonia Cathedral =

Cathedral in Manfredonia, Italy

Coordinates: 41°37′46″N 15°55′02″E

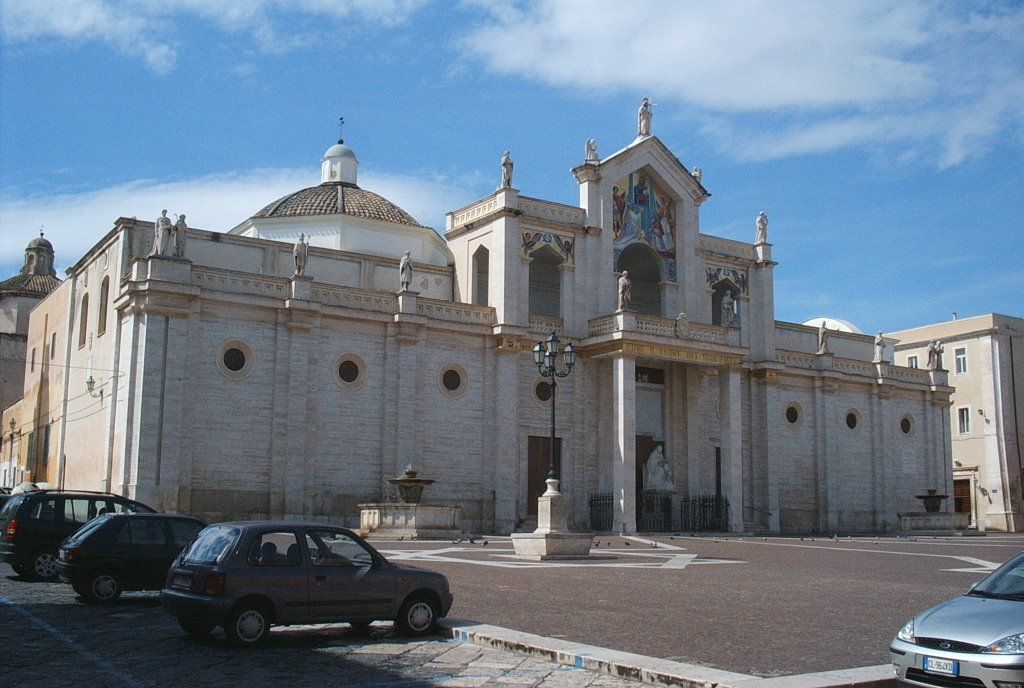

Manfredonia Cathedral (Italian: Duomo di Manfredonia, Cattedrale di San Lorenzo Maiorano) is a Roman Catholic cathedral in Manfredonia in Italy, dedicated to Saint Laurence of Siponto (Italian: Lorenzo Maiorano, "Laurence Majoranus"), one of the patron saints of the city. Formerly the archiepiscopal seat of the Archdiocese of Siponto, later known as Manfredonia, it is now the seat of the Archbishop of Manfredonia-Vieste-San Giovanni Rotondo.

== History ==
The construction of a cathedral in Manfredonia, after the transferral here of the seat of the bishops of Siponto, began on 7 February 1270 and finished in 1274. The first building was destroyed by the Turks during the sack of Manfredonia in 1620, and was not rebuilt until 1700, using the ruins of the old Angevin church on the authority of the then bishop, Bartolomeo della Cueva, Cardinal Vincenzo Maria Orsini (later Pope Benedict XIII), and Mgr. Andrea Cesarano. Della Cueva modified the main entrance, moving it to the opposite end of the church. He also had the canons' stalls constructed and the main altar.

Formerly the main entrance was where the campanile now stands that was built by Cardinal Orsini in 1677. The bell from the old campanile given by Archbishop Marullo in 1646 and cast by the famous Napoletan bellsetter Onofrio Giordano was transferred to the new tower.

In the cathedral are frescoes of 1940-1941, by Natale Penati of Milan, representing: Pope Julius III and Pope Benedict XIII; the apparition of Saint Lawrence to Totila; Justinus and companions, the saints of Siponto; and the Martyrs of Forconio.

Here are preserved the portraits of the archbishops (Orsini, Muscettola, Rivera, Tagliatela and others), some parchments, the baptismal registers from 1600 onwards and various other books.

The protectress of Manfredonia is the Madonna of Siponto, and the protector, San Lorenzo Maiorano (Laurence of Siponto), whose body was moved here from Siponto by Bishop Matteo Orsini, a member of the Dominican Order and later a cardinal, on 30 October 1327. The painting and the statue of the Madonna with her splendid crown of gold sprinkled with diamonds were blessed by Cardinal Angelo Giuseppe Roncalli, later Pope John XXIII, on 28 August 1955, the feast of the Coronation of the Virgin.

During the fire and the destruction of the cathedral by the Turks the body of Saint Laurence was also destroyed, except for the right arm, which remains in the cathedral today.

In the 1960s at the wish of the bishop Cesarano the new façade in travertine marble was constructed, which incorporates the marble statue of John XXIII created by the sculptor Aronne del Vecchio.
