= Justin of Chieti =

Saint Justin of Chieti
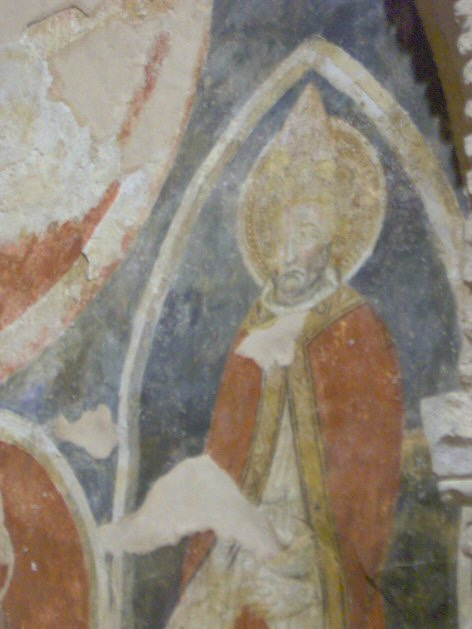
- Venerated in: Eastern Orthodox Church; Roman Catholic Church
- Feast: 1 January; 11 May (in Chieti)
- Patronage: Chieti

Saint Justin of Chieti (Italian: San Giustino di Chieti) is venerated as an early bishop of Chieti, Italy. His date of death varies, and is sometimes given as the 3rd, 4th, or 6th centuries.

Historical evidence for Justin's existence from before the 15th century does not exist. His passio dates from the 15th century and was modeled mostly on that of a saint with the same name, who was bishop of Siponto, while his brothers Florentius and Felix were martyred at Furci in the Abruzzo, along with Justin's niece Justa.

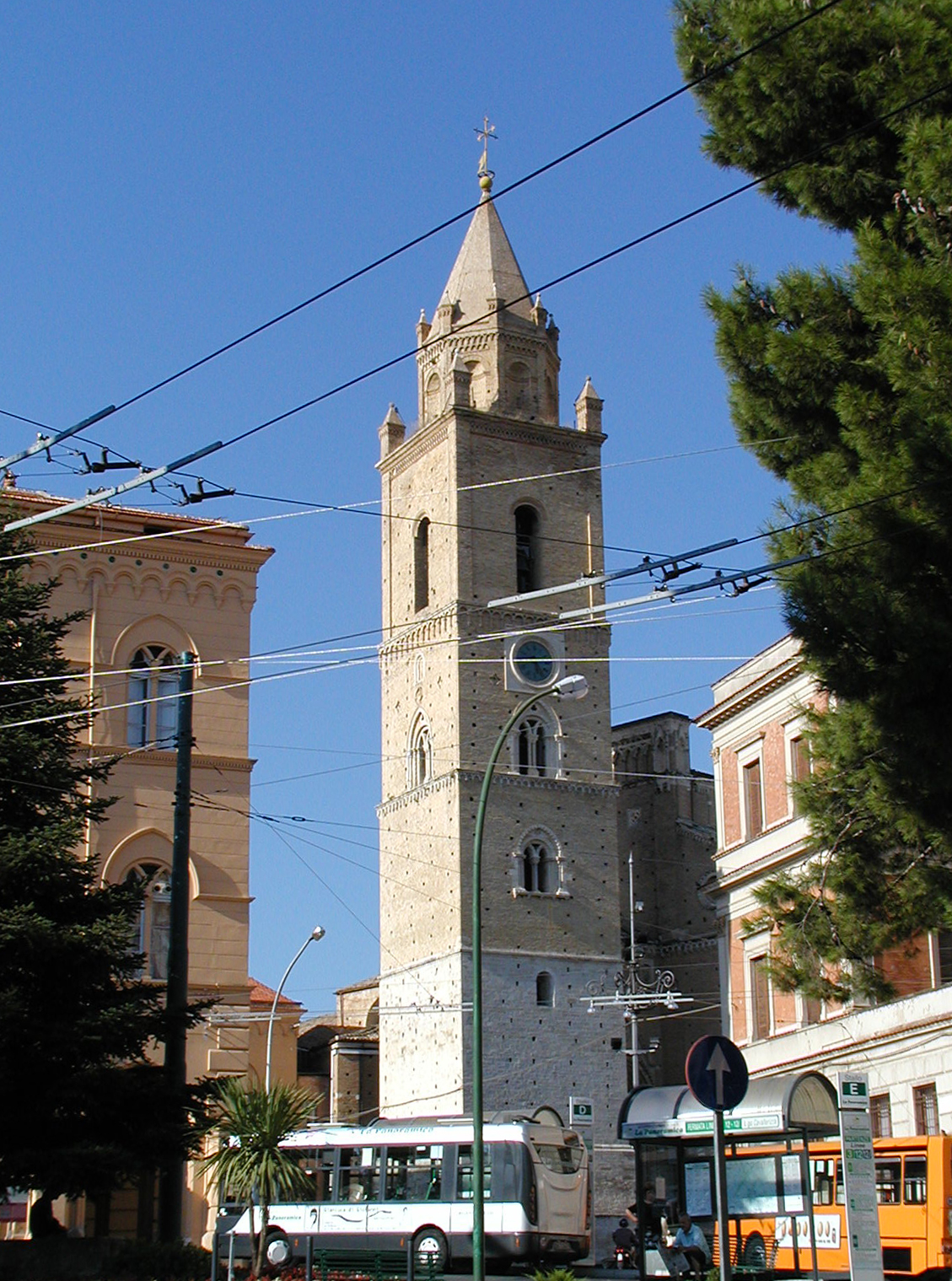
Cathedral of San Giustino in Chieti.

Chieti's cathedral (Duomo) was dedicated to him – and built – in the 9th century. Most of his relics, such as his arm, are found in an urn placed in the crypt of the cathedral of Chieti. He is mentioned in the Roman Martyrology for 1 January. His celebration was moved to 14 January in Chieti and later to 11 May.
