= Basilica of Santa Maria Maggiore di Siponto =

Church in southern Italy

Coordinates: 41°36′30″N 15°53′22″E

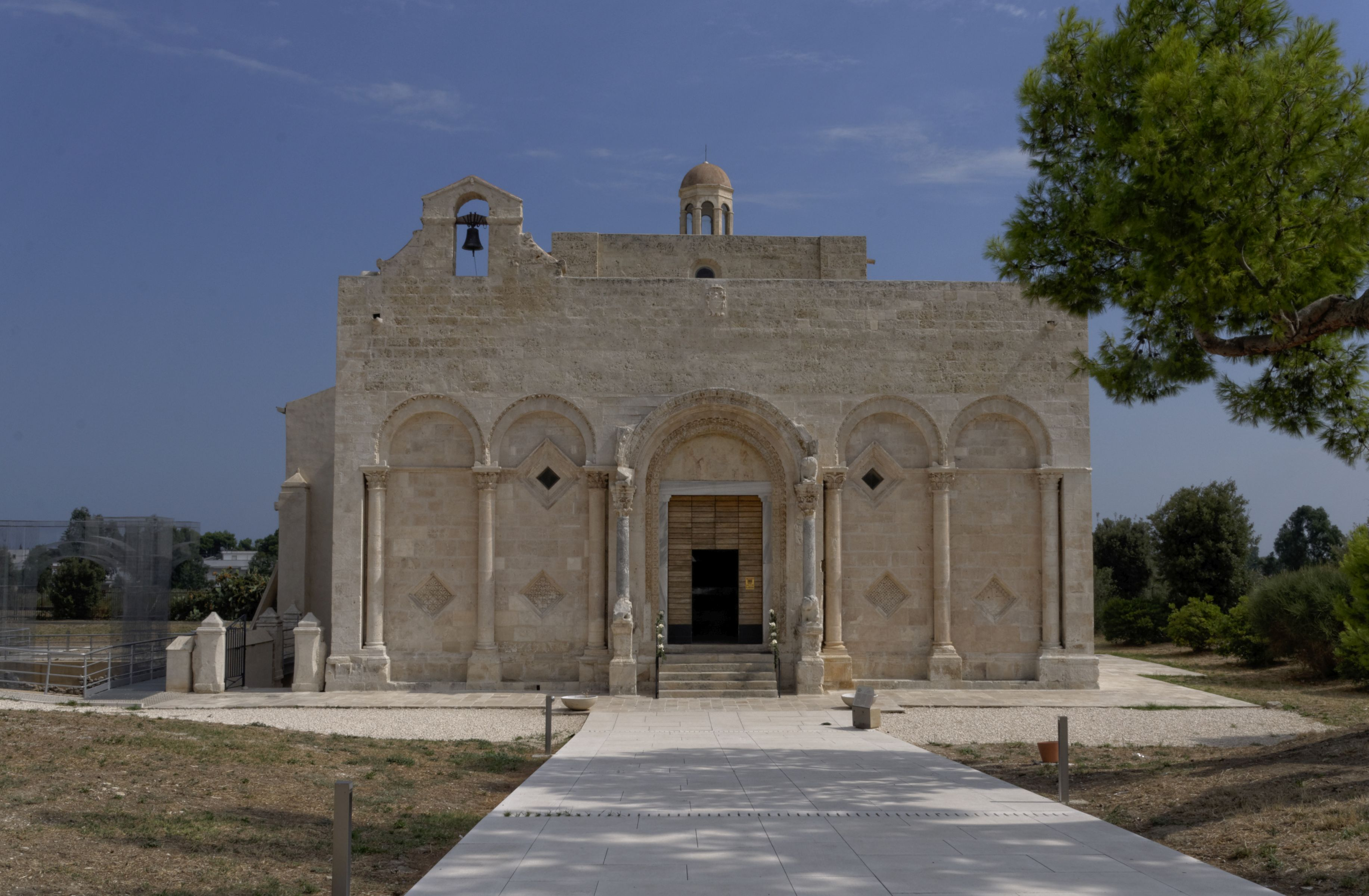
Façade of the basilica.

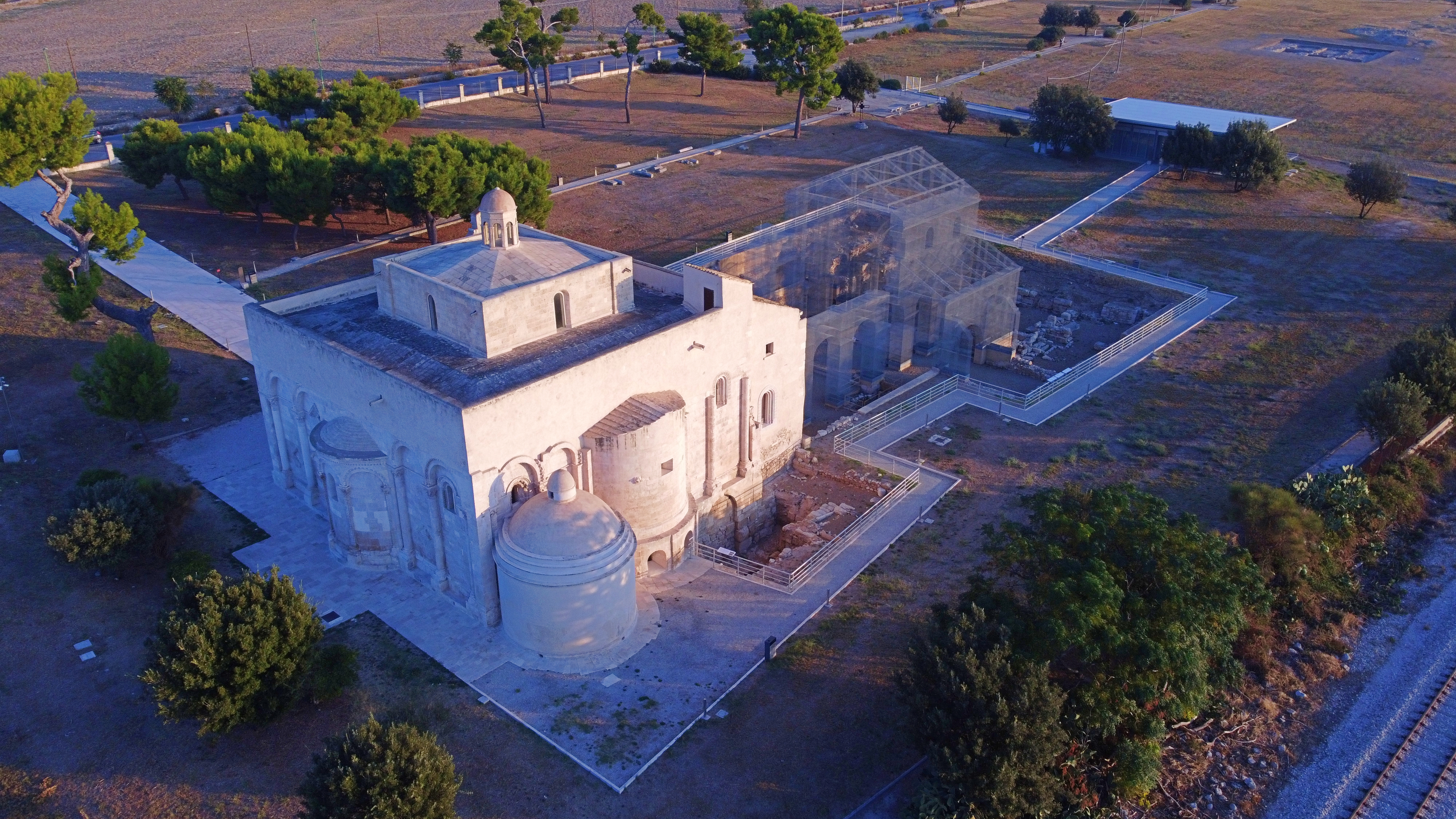
Aerial view of the site with the razed section of the original basilica outlined in metal girders

The Basilica of Santa Maria Maggiore di Siponto is a church approximately three miles south of Manfredonia, Apulia, southern Italy. Once the cathedral of the city of Siponto, it received the status of Basilica Minor in 1977; it is dedicated to the Holy Virgin of Siponto (the town was moved to the new city of Manfredonia in the mid-13th century).

The church was completed around 1117, when it was consecrated (perhaps in place of a pre-existing 6th century Palaeo-Christian edifice) and the relics of Laurence of Siponto were placed under the high altar.

== Description ==
The building has an unusual square plan, consisting of two independent churches (one, underground, is the current crypt), two apses on the southern and eastern walls, and a medieval monumental portal with two side lions, facing the road entering Manfredonia.

The interior, with four pillars, dates to the 11th century, and once housed the icon of the Holy Virgin of Siponto (Italian: Maria Santissima di Siponto), dated to the 7th century. The icon is now in the Manfredonia Cathedral, as well as the polychrome wood Byzantine statue of "La Sipontina" (6th century) The underground church dates to the early Middle Ages, and was replaced by the upper one after having been destroyed by an earthquake.

== See also ==
- Siponto
