= Justin of Siponto =

Saints Justin, Florentius, Felix and Justa
- Born: Probably Siponto
- Died: c. 310 AD; Furci
- Venerated in: Roman Catholic Church
- Feast: July 25 (not mentioned in recent martyrologies; Saint Justa has her own feast day of August 1)

Saint Justin of Siponto, as well as Saints Florentius, Felix, and Justa, are venerated as Christian martyrs by the Catholic Church. Information about them is fragmentary but their names were inserted into various martyrologies. Tradition states that Justin was a priest and bishop, that Florentius and Felix were his siblings, and that Justa was his niece. The earliest document about them dates from the 15th century; this is their legendary passio.

== Legend ==
They lived in Siponto at the beginning of the fourth century. Justin as the most erudite and eloquent of the three brothers. He was appointed bishop of Siponto. Florentius, meanwhile, married and had a daughter named Justa, named after Justin, who had baptized her. After a decade or so, the four left Siponto and went to Chieti, where they preached and performed miracles. Pagan priests, alarmed by this, contacted Maximian; the authorities ordered the four to sacrifice to Jove. Justin escaped to a mountain named Tubernium while Florentius, Felix, and Justa were arrested and taken to Forconium (Furci). Florentius and Felix were decapitated immediately, on July 25, 310. Justa was thrown into a burning furnace, but after emerging unharmed, was shot with arrows on August 1 of that year. She was buried in a place two miles from Furci where a basilica would later be built.

Justin, meanwhile, buried the bodies of his brothers beside that of his niece and died of natural causes at the age of eighty-four. He was buried near Offida (province of Ascoli Piceno), where a basilica was also built.

== Veneration ==
The varying dates of celebration and places with which they were associated has led scholars to believe that they are purely legendary. Justin was confused with the cult of Saint Justin of Chieti, whose feast day falls on January 1, and May 11 locally. Florentius and Felix were sometimes identified as soldier saints, probably through confusion with Felix of Nola. Of Justa it is known that there was a crypt dedicated to her at Bazzano, where her body was conserved. The church there was expanded in the 13th century. Her cult, with a feast day of August 1, was centered in the Abruzzo and Campania regions. There were three churches dedicated to her in Penne, Sulmona, and Chieti. The four saints all had their own feast day of July 25 in previous Roman Martyrologies; currently they are not mentioned in this martyrology.
