= Manfredonia Lighthouse =

Manfredonia
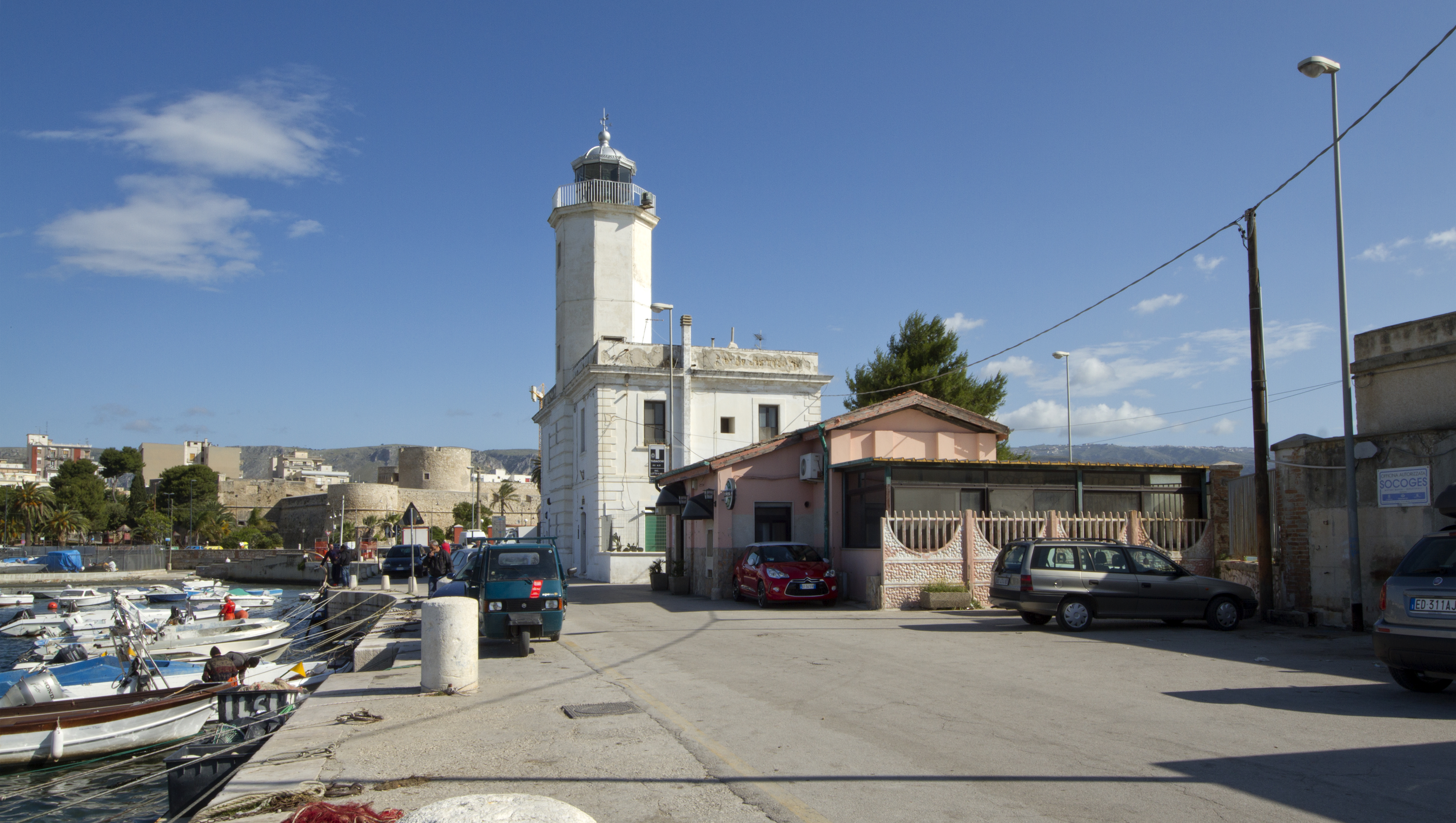
- Manfredonia Lighthouse in 2016
- Location: Manfredonia; Apulia; Italy
- Coordinates: 41°37′43″N 15°55′24″E

Tower
- Constructed: 1868
- Foundation: concrete base
- Construction: masonry tower
- Automated: yes
- Height: 18 metres (59 ft)
- Shape: octagonal prism tower with balcony and lantern
- Markings: white tower, grey metallic lantern dome
- Power source: mains electricity
- Operator: Marina Militare
- Fog signal: no

Light
- First lit: 1947 (rebuilt)
- Focal height: 20 metres (66 ft)
- Lens: Type LP3
- Intensity: AL 1000 W
- Range: main: 23 nautical miles (43 km; 26 mi) reserve: 18 nautical miles (33 km; 21 mi)
- Characteristic: Fl W 5s.
- Italy no.: 3796 E.F.

Manfredonia Lighthouse (Italian: Faro di Manfredonia) is an active lighthouse located at the debut of the east pier of the harbour of Manfredonia, in Apulia on the Adriatic Sea.

== Description ==
The lighthouse was built in 1868 and consists of a white octagonal prism tower, 18 metres (59 ft) high, with balcony and lantern, rising from a 2-storey white keeper's house. The lantern, painted in grey metallic, is positioned at 20 metres (66 ft) above sea level and emits one white flash in a 5 seconds period, visible up to a distance of 23 nautical miles (43 km; 26 mi). The lighthouse is completely automated and is managed by the Marina Militare with the identification code number 3796 E.F.

== See also ==
- List of lighthouses in Italy
- Manfredonia
