= Laurence of Siponto =

Italian saint

Laurence of Siponto, also known as Laurence Maioranus (Italian: Lorenzo Maiorano) (d. 7 February, c. 545), is an Italian saint, patron of the city of Manfredonia and the Archdiocese of Manfredonia-Vieste-San Giovanni Rotondo. Manfredonia Cathedral is dedicated to him. He is credited with founding the shrine to Saint Michael the Archangel on Mount Gargano.

== Life ==
According to a ninth century "vita", Laurence was from Constantinople. The bishopric of Siponto being vacant, the residents sent to Constantinople for a successor. Around 491 Emperor Zeno appointed his relative Laurence. It is not clear whether Laurence was consecrated bishop in Constantinople or in Rome by Pope Gelasius I. Laurence arrived in Siponto, bringing with him the relics of Saint Agatha and Saint Stephen. He was able to obtain from the emperor, material and workmen to build a church and baptistry.

Shortly after his appointment in 491 he received the visions of Saint Michael which led to the establishment of the shrine of Monte Gargano. He is credited with allegedly persuading the Gothic leader Totila to spare Siponto in 546.

In 1066, the Diocese of Siponto was separated from Benevento and re-established. Two vitas date from this time. "[N]o historical evidence survives for a Bishop Lawrence, and all signs of his cult date from the mid-eleventh century onwards..."

== Veneration ==
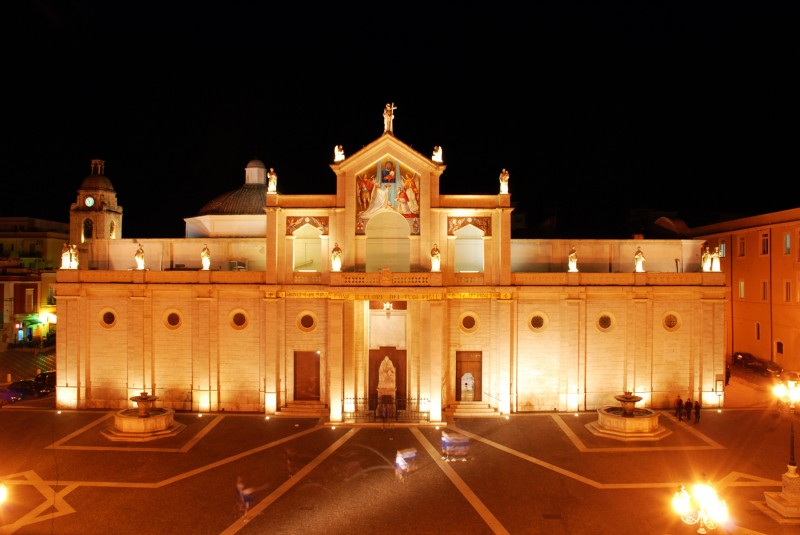
Cattedrale di Manfredonia

Saint Laurence is patron of the city of Manfredonia. The Duomo di Manfredonia, Cattedrale di San Lorenzo Maiorano is dedicated to him. A fresco depicts the apparition of Bishop Laurence appearing to Totila.

His relics are now in Cattedrale di San Lorenzo Maiorano, where they were translated in 1327 by Bishop Matteo Orsini from Siponto Cathedral where they lay under the high altar. During the fire and the destruction of the first cathedral by the Turks in 1620, the body of Saint Laurence was also destroyed, except for the right arm, which remains in the cathedral today. His feast is on 7 February.

== Sources and external links ==
- Catholic.org: summary biography
- Vailati, Valentino, 1990: San Lorenzo Maiorano vescovo e protagonista nella storia di Manfredonia. Edizioni del Golfo
