= Siponto =

Siponto Griko:Sèpius
- Frazione
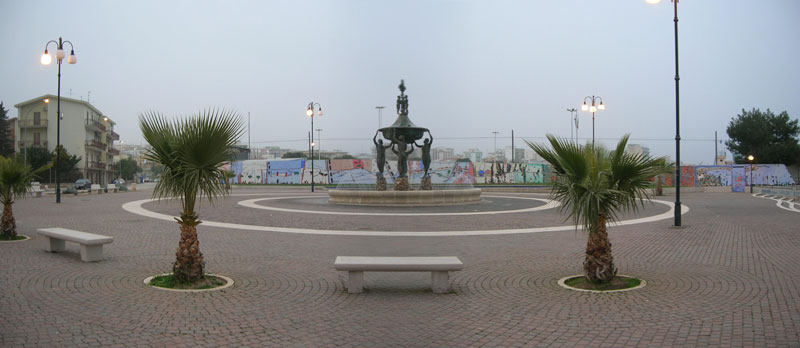
- Piazza Sant'Andrea

- Location of Siponto in Italy
- Coordinates: 41°36′25″N 15°53′45″E
- Country: Italy
- Region: Apulia
- Province: Foggia (FG)
- Comune: Manfredonia
- Elevation: 0 m (0 ft)
- Demonym: Sipontini
- Time zone: UTC+1 (CET)
  - Summer (DST): UTC+2 (CEST)
- Postal code: 71043
- Dialing code: 0884

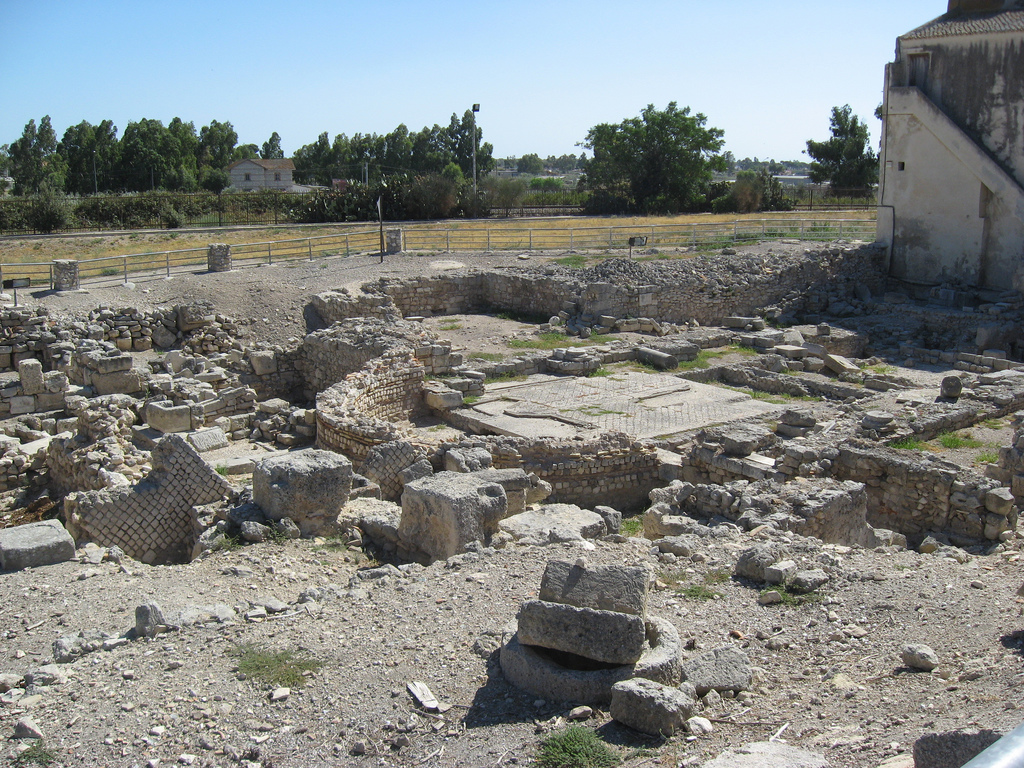
Ruins of the ancient basilica of Siponto

Siponto (Latin: Sipontum, Ancient Greek: Σιπιούς) was an ancient port town and bishopric of Magna Graecia in Apulia, southern Italy. The town was abandoned after earthquakes in the 13th century; today the area is administered as a frazione of the comune of Manfredonia, in the province of Foggia. Siponto is located around 3 km south of Manfredonia.

== History ==
According to ancient mythological writings, Sipontum was founded by Diomedes, product of the union of the Homeric hero of the same name with the daughter of the king of the Daunians. In reality, it is believed that Siponto was founded by the Daunians, an Iapygian tribe that inhabited northern Apulia in classical antiquity.

After falling into the hands of the Samnites, it was taken in about 335 BC by King Alexander of Epirus, uncle of Alexander the Great. In 189 BC it became a Roman colony with the name Sipontum. The name Sipious was used in Byzantine times. In 663 AD it was taken and destroyed by the Slavs.

In the ninth century, Sipontum was for a time in the power of the Saracens. In 1042 the Normans made it the seat of one of their twelve counties. The latter won a decisive victory there over the Byzantine general Argyrus in 1052.

Michael of Zahumlje on 10 July 926 sacked Siponto, which was a Byzantine town in Apulia. It remains unknown if he did this by Tomislav's supreme command as suggested by some historians. Apparently, Tomislav sent the Croatian navy under Michael's leadership to drive the Saracens from that part of southern Italy and free the city.

Before the second half of the 12th century, the Knight Templar and the Hospitalier Order founded their first Italian fincas in the area of Capitanata, which spanned from Siponto to Foggia, including Spinazzola, Borgonioni, Salpi, Trinitapoli, Santa Maria de Salinis, Belmonte, Lama and Bersentino. They were devoted to animal husbandry, the commerce of marine salt, the depot of dietary goods, the olive and vineyard cultivation, as well to the use of natural waterfalls through mills. Such a skilful administration of their assets, grew the economic and military potential of the Orders, who were engaged in the Crusades and in the protection of local communities.

Some of the Knight Templar's masserie survived until the 21st century. Lastly, Siponto produced one of the greatest medieval Jewish scholars, Rabbi Isaac ben Melchizedek, who composed one of the earliest commentaries on the Mishnah, a compendium of ancient Jewish oral law.

In 1223, a major earthquake centered on Monte Gargano destroyed nearly every building in Siponto. The tremors continued for another two years, until, by 1225, everything was in ruins.

== Ecclesiastical history ==
=== Ancient bishopric ===
According to legend, the Gospel was preached at Sipontum by Saint Peter and by Saint Mark. Another tradition relates the martyrdom of the priest Saint Justin and his companions under Gallienus and Maximian, about 255.

A bishopric of Sipontum (or Siponto) was established around 400 AD (or already in the third century according to others). The first bishop whose date may be fixed, was Felix, who was at Rome in 465.

Another legend reports that, in the time of bishop Laurence of Siponto, during the papacy of Gelasius I (492-496), the archangel Saint Michael appeared on Monte Gargano; in memory of the event, the Monastery of the Archangel was founded. Among the pilgrims were the emperors Otto III, Henry II, and Lothar III, and popes Leo IX, Urban II, and et Alexander III.

A bishop Felix is attested in 591 and 593, and a bishop Vitalianus in 597 and 599.

By about 688, Siponto was almost abandoned. The diocese was suppressed, and Pope Vitalian was obliged to entrust the pastoral care of Sipontum to the bishopric of Benevento.

=== New (arch)bishopric ===
The see was re-established in 1034 as Diocese of Siponto, recovering its territory from the meanwhile Metropolitan Archdiocese of Benevento. Bishops of Siponto, suffragans of Benevento, included Bonus (1049? – 1059?)

In April 1050, Pope Leo IX held a synod at Siponto, at which he deposed two archbishops, who were charged with simony.

In August 1059, at the Synod of Melfi, Pope Nicholas II deposed the archbishop of Trani and bishop of Siponto. Archbishop Johannes of Trani, in his tomb inscription claimed to be "Archiepiscopus Tranensis, Sipontinensis, Garganensis Ecclesiae, atque Imperialis Synkellus."

Bishop Guisard is attested in 1062.

Under bishop Gerardus Gerard (1066–74), Siponto became the non-Metropolitan Archdiocese of Siponto in 1074. Non-Metropolitan Archbishops of Siponto included Omobono (1087? – 1097?)

In 1090, the diocese of Siponto lost territory to establish the Diocese of Vieste.

In 1099 Siponto was promoted to the rank of Metropolitan Archdiocese of Siponto

=== Cathedral ===
The ancient cathedral remained still at Sipontum but, with the building of Manfredonia city by and named after King Manfred of Sicily, who decided to rebuild Siponto in a new nearby location, the archiepiscopal see was transferred to the new town in 1230, under its new title Metropolitan Archdiocese of Manfredonia (viz.), yet still Sipontin(us) as Latin adjective.

== See also ==
- list of Catholic dioceses in Italy
- Manfredonia Cathedral
- Roman Catholic Archdiocese of Manfredonia-Vieste-S. Giovanni Rotondo

== Notes and references ==
=== Bibliography ===
- Cappelletti, Giuseppe (1870). Le chiese d'Italia: dalla loro origine sino ai nostri giorni (in Italian). Vol. vigesimo (20). Venezia: G. Antonelli. pp. 577–594.
- Kamp, Norbert (1975). Kirche und Monarchie im staufischen Königreich Sizilien: I. Prosopographische Grundlegung, Bistumer und Bistümer und Bischöfe des Konigreichs 1194–1266: 2. Apulien und Calabrien München: Wilhelm Fink 1975.
- Kehr, Paulus Fridolin (1962). Italia pontificia. Regesta pontificum Romanorum. Vol. IX: Samnia – Apulia – Lucania. Berlin: Weidmann. (in Latin). pp. 230-267.
- Lanzoni, Francesco (1927). Le diocesi d'Italia dalle origini al principio del secolo VII (an. 604). (in Italian). Faenza: F. Lega, pp. 277-284; 291-294; 300-303; 165-168.
- Rački, Franjo (1861). Odlomci iz državnoga práva hrvatskoga za narodne dynastie (in Croatian). F. Klemma.
- Ughelli, Ferdinando; Coleti, NIccolo (1721). Italia sacra sive De episcopis Italiæ, et insularum adjacentium (in Latin). Vol. Tomus septimus (7). Venice: apud Sebastianum Coleti. pp. 810–865.

== Sources and external links ==
- Media related to Siponto at Wikimedia Commons
- History of Siponto
