= Tiberio Muscettola =

Most Reverend Tiberio Muscettola
- Archbishop of Manfredonia
- Church: Catholic Church
- Archdiocese: Archdiocese of Manfredonia
- In office: 1680–1708
- Predecessor: Pietro Francesco Orsini de Gravina
- Successor: Giovanni de Lerma

Orders
- Consecration: 19 May 1680 by Pietro Francesco Orsini de Gravina

Personal details
- Born: 1637 Naples, Italy
- Died: Unknown

Tiberio Muscettola, C.O. (born 1637) was a Roman Catholic prelate who served as Archbishop of Manfredonia (1680–1708).

== Biography ==
Tiberio Muscettola was born in 1637 in Naples, Italy and ordained a priest in the Oratory of Saint Philip Neri. On 13 May 1680, he was appointed during the papacy of Pope Pius VI as Archbishop of Manfredonia. On 19 May 1680, he was consecrated bishop by Pietro Francesco Orsini de Gravina, Bishop of Cesena, with Stefano Brancaccio, Bishop of Viterbo e Tuscania, and Ludovico della Quadra, Bishop of Mottola, serving as co-consecrators. He served as Archbishop of Manfredonia until his resignation on 25 February 1708.

== External links and additional sources ==
- Cheney, David M. "Archdiocese of Manfredonia-Vieste-San Giovanni Rotondo". Catholic-Hierarchy.org. (for Chronology of Bishops) ^{[self-published]}
- Chow, Gabriel. "Archdiocese of Manfredonia-Vieste-San Giovanni Rotondo (Italy)". GCatholic.org. (for Chronology of Bishops) ^{[self-published]}

Catholic Church titles
Preceded by Pietro Francesco Orsini de Gravina	Archbishop of Manfredonia; 1680–1708	Succeeded by Giovanni de Lerma
