= Manfredonia =

- Comune
- Comune di Manfredonia
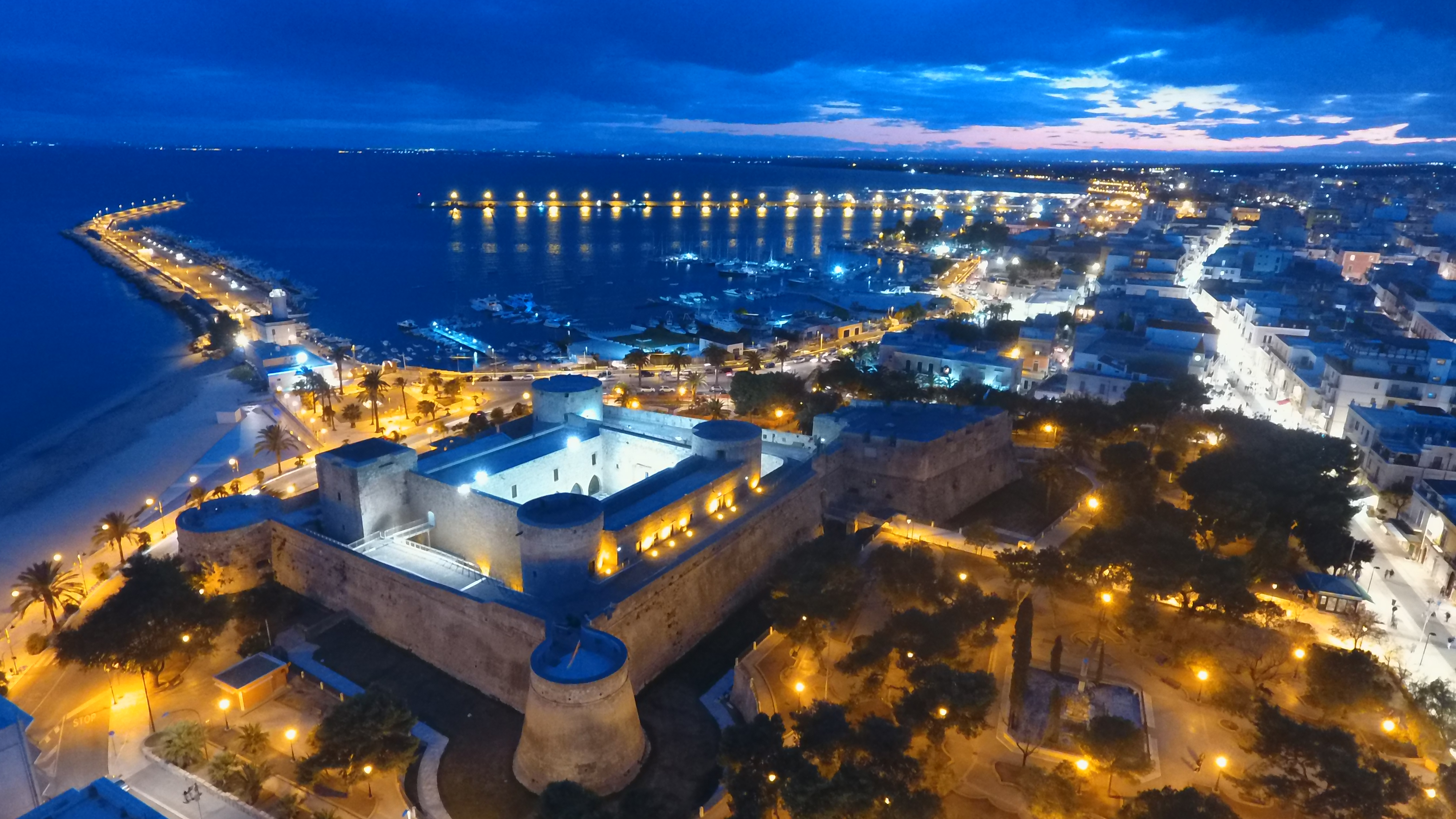
- Night view of Manfredonia

- Manfredonia within the Province of Foggia

- Location within Italy Location within Apulia
- Coordinates: 41°38′N 15°55′E
- Country: Italy
- Region: Apulia
- Province: Foggia
- Frazioni: Borgo Mezzanone, Riviera Sud (Sciali and Ippocampo), Pastini, Ruggiano, San Salvatore, Siponto, Tomaiuolo

Government
  - Mayor: Domenico La Marca (Partito Democratico)

Area
  - Total: 354.54 km^{2} (136.89 sq mi)
- Elevation: 5 m (16 ft)

Population (2026)
  - Total: 53,015
  - Density: 149.53/km^{2} (387.29/sq mi)
- Demonym(s): Manfredoniani, Sipontini
- Time zone: UTC+1 (CET)
  - Summer (DST): UTC+2 (CEST)
- Postal code: 71043
- Dialing code: 0884
- Patron saint: Saint Laurence of Siponto (San Lorenzo Maiorano)
- Saint day: 7 February
- Website: Official website

Manfredonia (Italian: [maɱfreˈdɔːnja], Mambredònje in local dialect) is a town and commune in the Province of Foggia in the region of Apulia in southern Italy, located about 35 kilometres (22 miles) northeast of Foggia. It has 53,015 inhabitants.

Manfredonia is situated on the coast, facing east, to the south of Monte Gargano, and gives its name to the gulf to the east of it.

== History ==
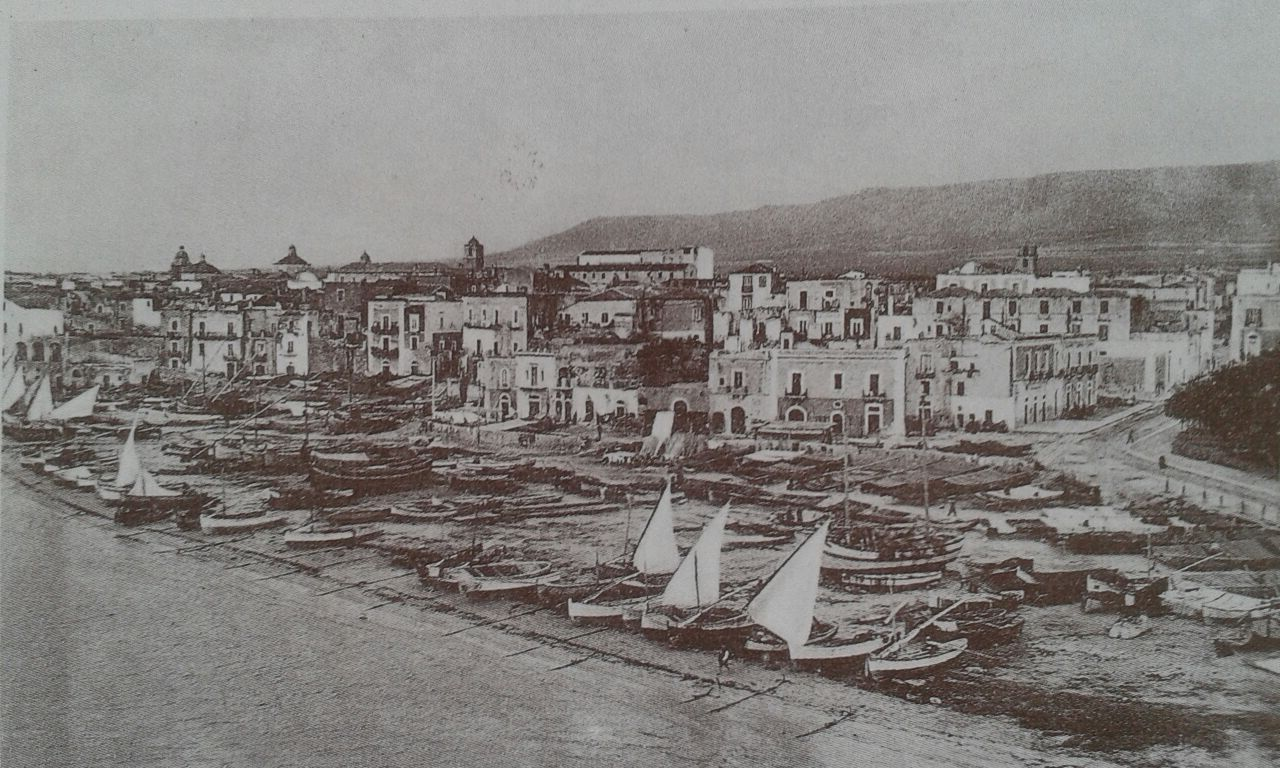
Historic centre of Manfredonia in the early 20th century

The area of current Manfredonia was settled in ancient times by the Greeks.

In 189 BC Sipontum was conquered by the Romans and became a colony of citizens. It was a port at the junction of the road which basically followed the Adriatic coast (but giving the Garganus mountain's peninsula just north a miss) and a road through Arpi, Luceria, Aecae and Aequum Tuticum connecting at Beneventum to the Via Appia.

In AD 663 it was taken and destroyed by the Slavs (Narentines). In the 9th century, Sipontum was for a time in the power of the Saracens.

In 1042 the Normans made it the seat of one of their twelve counties, while the Monte Gargano remained Byzantine. The Normans won a decisive victory there over the Byzantine general Argyrus in 1052. Siponto was an archbishopric in the Norman countship of Apulia.

Having become unhealthy owing to the stagnation of the water in the lagoons after the 1223 earthquake, Siponto was abandoned. The modern city of Manfredonia was built by King Manfred between 1256 and 1263, several kilometers north of the ruins of the ancient Sipontum. The Angevins, who had defeated Manfred and stripped him of the Kingdom of Sicily, renamed it Sypontum Novellum ("New Sypontum"), but that name never stuck.

In 1528 Manfredonia resisted a French attack led by Odet de Foix, Viscount of Lautrec. In 1620 the city was sacked by the Ottomans, who enslaved a few hundred people and burnt the city.

== Geography ==
Manfredonia is located in south of Gargano. It borders with the municipalities of Carapelle, Cerignola, Foggia, Monte Sant'Angelo, San Giovanni Rotondo, San Marco in Lamis and Zapponeta.

It counts 7 civil parishes (frazioni): Borgo Mezzanone, Riviera Sud (Sciali and Ippocampo), Pastini, Ruggiano, San Salvatore, Siponto and Tomaiuolo.

== Demographics ==
As of 2026, the population is 53,015, of which 49.7% are male, and 50.3% are female. Minors make up 14.7% of the population, and seniors make up 25.4%.

Historical population

Year	Pop.	±%
1861	7,513	—
1871	7,588	+1.0%
1881	9,016	+18.8%
1901	11,013	+22.1%
1911	12,704	+15.4%
1921	13,964	+9.9%
1931	17,443	+24.9%
1936	20,003	+14.7%

Year	Pop.	±%
1951	29,925	+49.6%
1961	37,157	+24.2%
1971	45,520	+22.5%
1981	53,030	+16.5%
1991	58,318	+10.0%
2001	57,704	−1.1%
2011	56,257	−2.5%
2021	54,342	−3.4%

Source: ISTAT

=== Immigration ===
As of 2025, immigrants make up 4.3% of the population. The 5 largest foreign countries of birth are Romania, Germany, Senegal, Morocco, and Bulgaria.

== Main sights ==
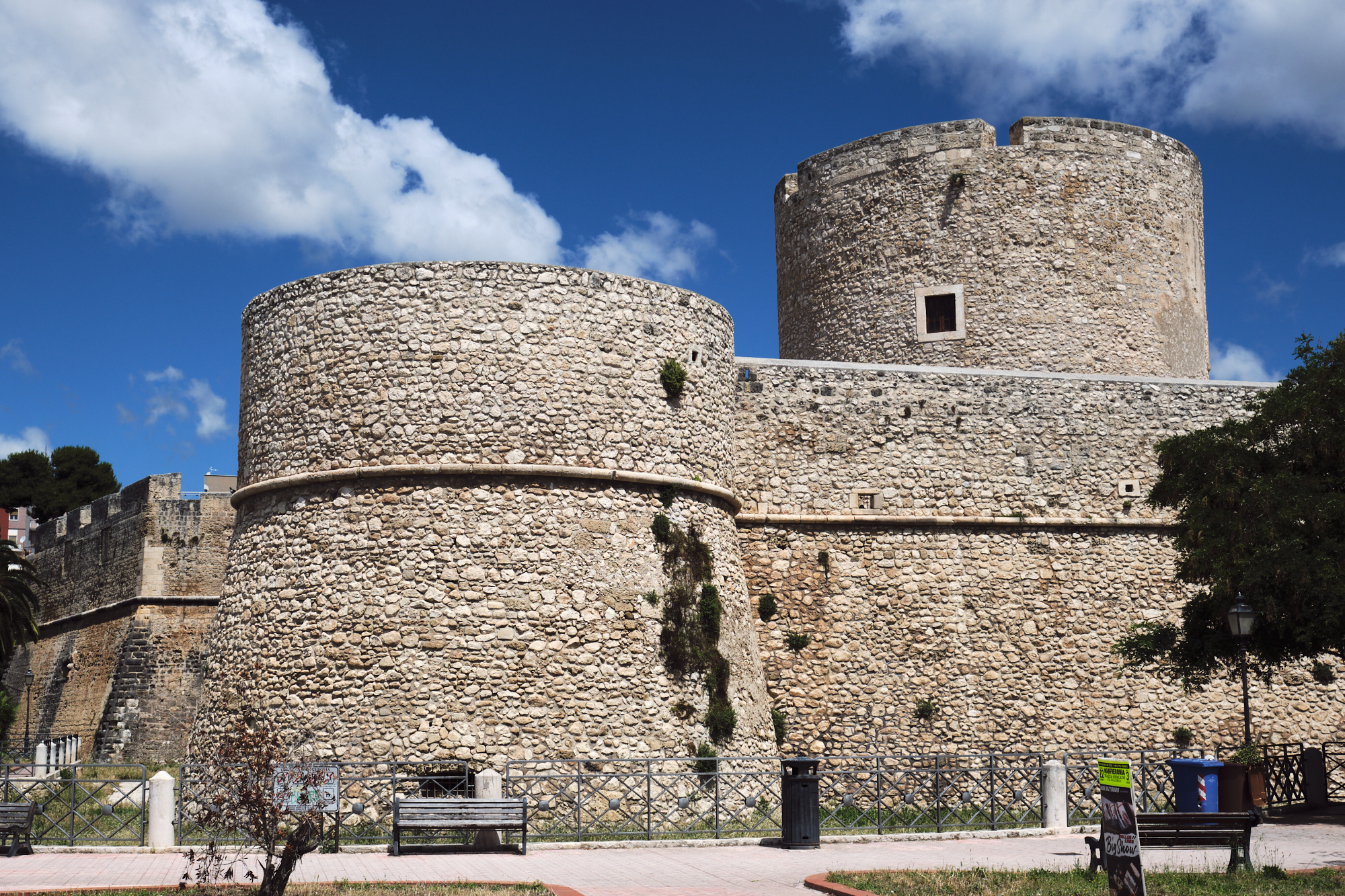
Castello di Manfredonia

The Castello di Manfredonia, begun by the Hohenstaufen and completed by the Angevins, and parts of the town walls are well preserved. The castle received a new line of walls in the 15th century.

In the church of San Domenico, the Chapel of the Maddalena contains old paintings of the 14th century.

Three kilometers (1.9 miles) to the southwest is the former Siponto Cathedral, now the Basilica of Santa Maria Maggiore di Siponto, built in 1117 in the Romanesque style, with a dome and crypt.

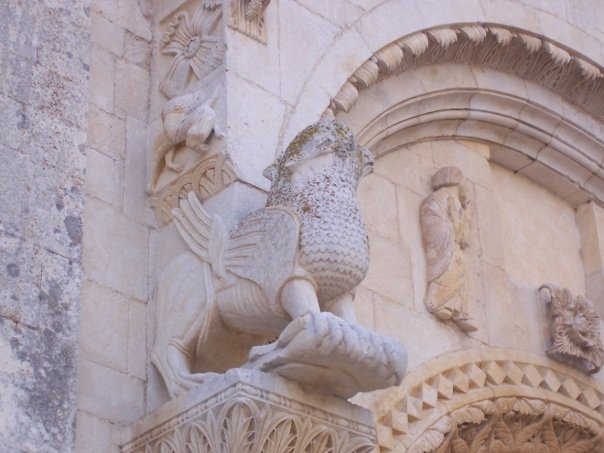
Detail of decorations in the Abbazia di San Leonardo in Lama Volara

The Abbazia di San Leonardo in Lama Volara, nearer to Foggia, belonging to the Teutonic Order, is of the same date.

Manfredonia is also the location of the seat of the Archbishopric of Manfredonia-Vieste-S. Giovanni Rotondo in Manfredonia Cathedral, rebuilt in the 17th century after the destruction by the Turks of its 13th-century predecessor.

== Transport ==
A dual carriageway links Manfredonia to Foggia, a distance of 40 km (25 mi) and to A14 motorway.

Manfredonia railway station is the terminal of the Foggia-Manfredonia line. Other stations serving the municipal territory are Manfredonia Città (closed), Siponto (in the homonymous village), Frattarolo, Candelaro and Amendola.

== Notable people ==
- Laurence of Siponto (died 545), bishop, saint, patron of Manfredonia
- Vettor Pisani (1324–1380), Venetian admiral
- Pino Rucher (1924–1996), guitarist and arranger

== See also ==
- Manfredonia Calcio
- 1976 Manfredonia accidental release of arsenic
- Manfredonia Molo di Levante Lighthouse

== Sources ==
- A. Beltramelli, Il Gargano (Bergamo, 1907)
- Westermann, Großer Atlas zur Weltgeschichte
