= 1976 Manfredonia accidental release of arsenic =

Industrial disaster in Italy

Coordinates: 41°38′46.7″N 15°56′44.4″E

In September 26, 1976, an industrial accident at an ANIC facility in Manfredonia, Italy, led to the release 39 tons of arsenic into the atmosphere. In addition to death animals and the hospitalization of several people immediately following the incident, environmental contamination in an area roughly 15 km^{2} surrounding the facility devastated local wildlife. The release also had long-term impacts on human health, with workers and residents of Manfredonia exhibiting a higher mortality rate due to lung cancer. Government response to the incident was perceived as slow and inadequate by the public.

== Background and details of the disaster ==
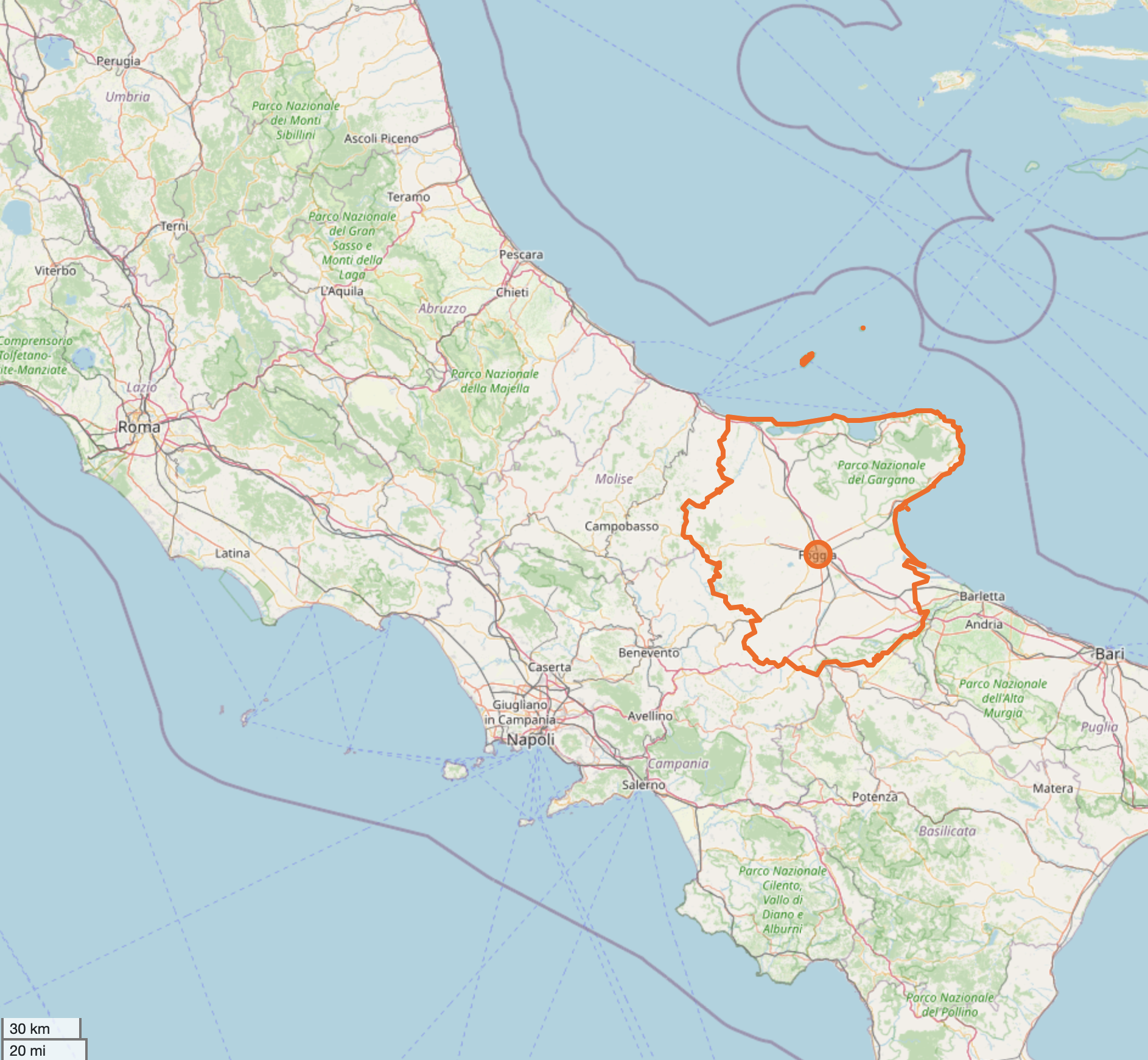
Province of Foggia, in Southern Italy, marked in orange.

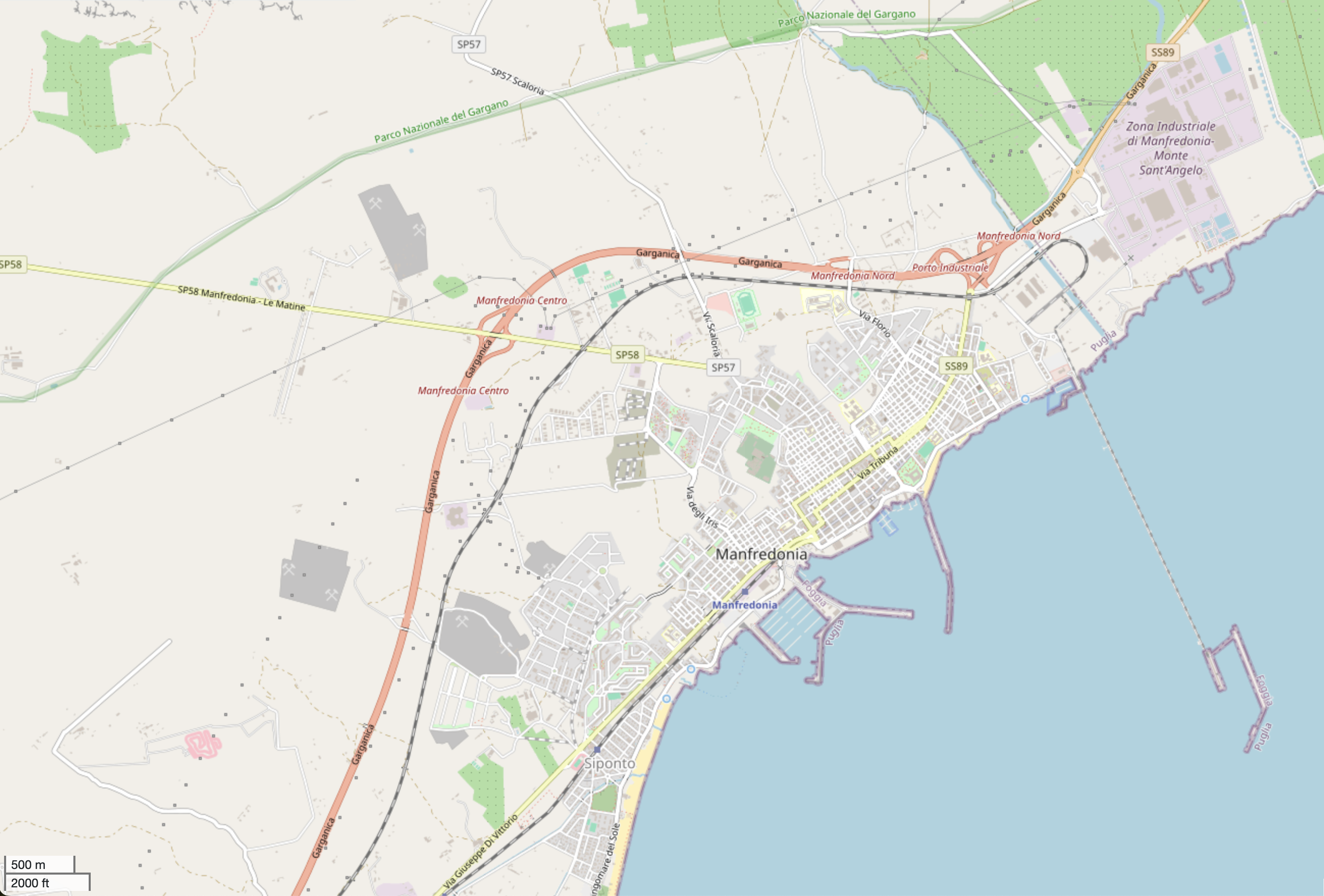
Map of Manfredonia, with the ENIC site to the east of the city (in lilac color).

On September 26, 1976, shortly before 10 a.m., a severe accident occurred at a petrochemical plant owned by the Italian state enterprise ANIC (Azienda Nazionale Idrogenazione Combustibili) in Manfredonia, located in the Italian province of Foggia. The facility, primarily used for the production of plastics and fertilizers, experienced a catastrophic explosion in an ammonia production column. The explosion released an estimated 39 tons of arsenic into the atmosphere, dispersed in various forms, including liquid and solid particles from the column's structure. Additionally, a toxic gas cloud formed and spread over the surrounding area, particularly affecting the town of Manfredonia, which had approximately 50,000 inhabitants at the time of the disaster.

Although the consequences of the incident became immediately evident the following day—with numerous animals found dead and several individuals, especially plant workers and residents from the nearby Monticchio district, arriving at hospitals with acute symptoms of poisoning—ANIC management downplayed the severity of the event, denying any significant risk. The consequences of this downplaying by ANIC, as well as by other stakeholders, along with further cover-ups and poor decisions in the following days and weeks, would become significantly noticeable both in the short term and over the decades.

The origins of the ANIC facility in Manfredonia are rooted in the history of Southern Italy’s late industrialisation. Whereas, in 1961 30.2% of the population in Northern Italy worked in non-agricultural sectors, in the South, the corresponding figure was barely 10%. This stark contrast in industrialization prompted the Italian government to invest heavily in capital-intensive industries in the South to foster economic development, albeit with mixed results and unintended consequences. Alongside the ANIC plant in Manfredonia, notable industrial projects included the steelworks in Taranto and the petrochemical plant in Brindisi.

The Manfredonia plant operated from 1971 until 1994, experiencing numerous incidents, with the 1976 explosion being the most severe. At the time of the accident, the plant employed approximately 1,550 workers, including around 600 contract workers. Since 1989, Manfredonia has been designated as a "high environmental crisis risk" area under Italian law. Subsequently, it was identified as a site of national interest (SIN – Sito di Interesse Nazionale) within a program focused on the remediation and restoration of ecologically damaged sites.

The incident at the ANIC plant in Manfredonia in 1976 remains largely unknown both internationally and among the Italian public to this day. This is partly due to the fact that the peak period of labor-related environmental activism in Italy had already come to an end by that time. Furthermore, there was not a single SMAL (Servizi di Medicina del Lavoro) team in the entire area. SMAL was a structure specifically dedicated to workplace health, with a focus on regular medical check-ups as well as topics like occupational safety and risk management. Additionally, certain power structures in Southern Italy and conflicts of interest contributed to a nearly complete cover-up.

== Impact of the accident ==
The arsenic release had devastating effects on the environment. The release led to widespread soil and water contamination, affecting local agriculture and ecosystems. The arsenic settled in the soil, posing long-term risks to both the environment and human health.

Initial assessments indicated potential acute health risks for workers present during the accident and residents in the vicinity. The immediate health effects included respiratory issues and skin irritation due to exposure to airborne arsenic. Local hospitals and clinics reported an increase in cases of arsenic-related symptoms, particularly among workers at the plant and residents living in proximity to the plant. However, the full extent of arsenic exposure and its health consequences became apparent only over time, as cases of chronic health conditions, including skin and lung cancers, appeared in the population.

=== Environmental Impact ===
The fallout affected approximately 15 square kilometres of the surrounding area, including cultivated land and vegetation. Contaminants included liquid solutions and solid materials that polluted areas near the plant. A toxic cloud, reaching heights of up to 200 meters, dispersed toward the city of Manfredonia, adversely impacting air quality and contaminating soil and water sources. The persistence of arsenic compounds in the environment posed risks of chronic exposure for residents and wildlife, threatening ecosystems, and disrupting food chains. Additionally, unusual stringy algae were observed on the seabed, indicative of eutrophication or severe damage to the aquatic ecosystem. Investigations also uncovered illegal dumping of industrial waste on land and in the sea, further compounding the environmental impact.

=== Legal and political Impact ===
The Manfredonia arsenic release had far-reaching legal and political ramifications. In 1996, the Court of Foggia initiated legal proceedings to determine the accountability of plant managers and medical consultants for the health impacts experienced by workers following the arsenic release. The trial, which spanned over a decade, concluded in 2007 with the acquittal of all defendants. This outcome left the affected workers and community with feelings of injustice and a lack of closure.

Also, Enichem faced lawsuits from affected residents and environmental groups, who demanded compensation for the health and environmental damages. The incident also led to public outcry over the lack of safety measures and oversight in Italy's industrial sector. In response, the Italian government enacted stricter environmental regulations and increased oversight of chemical plants. These measures included improved reporting of toxic releases, stricter pollution limits, and more rigorous safety protocols for industrial facilities. The disaster raised awareness of the health risks associated with industrial pollution and contributed to Italy's adoption of EU safety standards and environmental protection laws in subsequent years.

=== Socioeconomic Impact ===
The 1976 Manfredonia disaster not only threatened public health but also strained relationships between residents, authorities, and industrial stakeholders, with the following years marked by unchecked pollution and recurring chemical accidents. Manfredonia's residents described their history as a “continuous catastrophe” due to ongoing challenges.

Factory workers bore the brunt of the health and socioeconomic consequences of the incident, facing the most severe impacts compared to other groups. Those showing signs of arsenic intoxication within hours of the incident were mainly plant workers and residents of Monticchio, an impoverished neighborhood housing labor migrants.

The disaster devastated Manfredonia's economy, a town heavily reliant on agriculture and fishing. Reports of arsenic contamination in soil and water triggered fears of food safety, forcing farmers to destroy potentially tainted crops. In 1988, the World Health Organization identified Manfredonia as a high-risk area for industrial pollution, warning of toxins contaminating the food chain.

=== Community Response to the Disaster ===
Following the arsenic release, fear and confusion spread among residents, many of whom were unaware of the contamination's full extent until symptoms of exposure, such as nausea and skin irritation, became evident. These experiences deepened public distrust of the factory and local authorities.

In 1988, residents protested against the petrochemical firm after three major events: the approval of an industrial waste incinerator, legal action over dolphin deaths caused by industrial wastewater, and the government's decision to redirect a toxic cargo ship to Manfredonia. Public outrage led to widespread strikes and opposition to the plant.

Between 1988 and 1990, strong civic mobilization, including diverse social groups led by women, organized protests and educational initiatives. These efforts halted the construction of the waste incinerator and the arrival of the toxic cargo ship, but community divisions arose, particularly between activists and workers fearing job losses.

The case of Nicola Lovecchio, a factory worker whose illness highlighted arsenic contamination, exposed hazardous working conditions. Despite evidence of ongoing contamination, plant managers were acquitted in court due to insufficient proof linking arsenic in workers’ blood to factory pollution.

Following the plant's closure in the early 1990s, significant contamination persisted without cleanup efforts. Public funds were allocated for new industrial projects that worsened conditions, deepening the community's disenfranchisement.

== Short term and long term Health Impacts ==
Inhalation of arsenic particles was the main way factory workers and contract workers were contaminated. Contract workers employed especially to clean up the disaster were not given any protective equipment for the first six days. They cleaned facilities using brooms and water jets that spread arsenic particles further in the air increasing the likelihood of inhalation. Manfredonia's residents also inhaled arsenic due to the cloud of arsenic that spread from the factory across the town.

=== Short-term Health Impacts ===
Following the disaster one hundred factory workers were hospitalized with symptoms of arsenic poisoning which includes abdominal pain, vomiting and diarrhea. Factory managers did not inform workers of the risks, and many returned to work despite arsenic being carcinogenic. Many workers were often poorly housed and had come to Manfredonia from the countryside in the search for jobs, they have described feeling like “mice in a trap”; forced to go back to work.

One way of analyzing arsenic poisoning in the short term is through urine. Bari University performed urine samples on 1,188 factory workers during the 50 days after the incident. Arsenic threshold levels present in urine were initially fixed by local authorities at 100 μg/L but later increased to 300 μg/L so that workers could return to work; falsely believing they had not been contaminated. Arsenic was detected in the urine of 45% of the factory workers sampled, with 98 individuals showing arsenic levels exceeding 3000 μg/L.

==== Short-term psychological impacts ====
Fear and anxiety about potential long-term health effects, including cancer and other diseases, were widespread among the population. Contract workers and fertilizer area staff involved in the cleanup operations endured heightened stress, exacerbated by their exposure to a highly contaminated environment without adequate protective equipment. For the general population, the proximity of the explosion and the visible aftermath, such as toxic clouds, caused significant psychological distress. Many residents feared for their immediate safety and long-term well-being, creating an atmosphere of uncertainty and anxiety within the community.

=== Long-term Health Impacts ===
In the 15 to 20 years following the accident, the long-term health consequences of arsenic poisoning became apparent, notably non-communicable diseases like lung cancer and cardiovascular disease. The event is an example of how a man-made disaster such as exposure to arsenic cause non-communicable diseases as both residents and workers have been impacted.

Research has been conducted to compare lung cancer risk of workers in the Manfredonia factory who were exposed to arsenic after the accident to plastic factory workers who were not. The research finds that standardized mortality rate for lung cancer is greater than 1.0 in Manfredonia's factory workers compared with plastic workers which is less than 1.0. This shows that the study population (Manfredonia's factory workers) are more likely to die from lung cancer because of arsenic exposure than the general population (plastic workers).

Similarly, resident's lung cancer mortality rate before the incident is lower than 20 years following the incident. It has increased since 2000 which is consistent with the latency period of 20 years for long-term health impacts of arsenic poisoning to appear.

Cardiovascular disease is also prevalent in the local population of Manfredonia. Residents have a higher-than-average rate of cardiovascular disease compared with regional results. The resident sampled population of men and women are 35% and 54% respectively more likely to die from a heart attack than the regional average.

==== Long-term psychological Impacts ====
The fear associated with how authorities dealt with the aftermath of the incident also has long-term impacts on the community. Residents have described the 1978 explosion as a “continuous catastrophe” due to long-term health consequences and a lack of accountability for the suffering caused to a working-class population who had no choice but to return to work.

== Lessons emerged from the disaster ==
=== Enhancing Safety Management and Risk Evaluation in Industrial Facilities ===
This accident emphasizes the need to strengthen safety management in chemical plants, especially those using toxic materials. The investigation report on the accident at the Manfredonia fertilizer plant found deficiencies in the design and operation of the plant, as well as the lack of an effective emergency stop system and containment of spills of hazardous substances. As a result, the plant failed to prevent the release of toxic gases in time for the accident. This incident prompted Italy and other European countries to tighten regulation of the chemical industry, particularly concerning toxic substance management facilities, and ultimately led to the creation of the European Union's ‘Seveso Directive’, which requires companies to develop detailed risk management and contingency plans and to disclose risk information to the public regularly.

=== The Importance of Worker Safety and Training ===
The accident demonstrated that workers were not provided adequate safety equipment and training for hazardous situations, directly contributing to their widespread exposure. The Loss Prevention Bulletin 251 provides valuable insights into how industrial accidents can be better managed through improved safety practices. For example, industries can adapt their protocols to address specific risks and emphasize the importance of regular drills, the correct use of personal protective equipment (PPE) and compliance with safety regulations.

=== Importance of Timely and Transparent Public Communication and Emergency Drills ===
In the immediate aftermath of the accident, local communities were not notified of the spill, delaying the time to take preventive measures. This negligence led to increased public health risks and increased community distrust. Factories should inform the population of the types of wastes that are regularly discharged from the factory into the air, sewage or neighboring waters, as well as by-products that may be accidentally discharged into the environment around the factory.

Manfredonia is one of many examples of a community exposed to chemical hazards and pollution, often lacking sufficient awareness, preparedness, and an adequate risk assessment. Studies have shown that people living in the neighborhood who are trained to participate in disaster simulation exercises are able to respond more effectively in emergencies, thereby reducing health risks.

=== Necessity of environmental monitoring and long-term health tracking ===
The arsenic spill contaminated soil, air and water bodies, leading to long-term environmental and health impacts. In Manfredonia, decades of epidemiological studies have revealed the delayed effects of arsenic exposure on workers and residents. These findings emphasize the importance of follow-up studies to monitor populations for long-term diseases such as cancer, proteinuria and hepatotoxicity.

== Controversies ==
The slow and inadequate response of the Italian government and local authorities in the aftermath of the Manfredonia disaster is a controversial topic. The spread of arsenic compounds could have been mitigated with a more rapid and coordinated response. This has led to a debate about the preparedness and effectiveness of emergency response protocols for dealing with such industrial accidents.

The accuracy and completeness of health impact assessments conducted after a disaster is controversial. Some have argued that the long-term health effects on the local population were underestimated and that the latency period for arsenic-related diseases was not adequately considered in the initial epidemiologic studies. After the accident, plant managers failed to inform workers of the risks and allowed them to return to work. And they adjusted the arsenic threshold in urine from 100 to 300 micrograms per liter, incorrectly determining that workers were not contaminated so that they could return to work. This has led to controversy about the true scale of the health effects of the disaster.

Italy's drive for industrial growth, especially in the south, has often come at the expense of environmental protection. The Manfredonia disaster has come to symbolize this conflict, with critics arguing that the rush to industrialize has led to lax environmental standards that ignore the potential health risks associated with these industries.

The handling of the disaster by management and government officials at the Eni chemical plant has raised concerns about transparency and public trust. There are allegations that the severity of the accident has been downplayed and that information about risks and health impacts has not been effectively communicated to the public. Adding to the complexity, renowned scientists at laboratories in Bari and Milan, responsible for the urine tests, were also on ENI's payroll and withheld the test results from the public for over a week. Ultimately, they were forced to disclose that, in hundreds of cases, the maximum standard limits had been exceeded by a factor of 20 to 50.

The Manfredonia disaster also sparked an ethical debate about the responsibility of industry in ensuring the safety of workers and the surrounding community. The controversy centers on whether industries take adequate measures to prevent accidents, protect workers from hazardous substances, and adequately compensate those affected by such disasters. The incidence of non-communicable diseases, such as lung cancer and cardiovascular disease, has risen in both residents and workers over the 15–20 years since the accident. This has sparked controversy about the need for greater transparency in the management of industrial accidents.
