= Federico Pizza =

Italian Catholic prelate

- Archbishop of Manfredonia e Vieste; Titular Archbishop of Nisibis
- Church: Catholic Church
- Archdiocese: Manfredonia e Vieste
- See: Nisibis
- Appointed: 24 March 1884 (Manfredonia e Vieste); 19 April 1897 (Nisibis)
- Term ended: 19 April 1897 (Manfredonia e Vieste); 28 March 1909 (Nisibis)
- Predecessor: Beniamino Feuli (Manfredonia e Vieste); Giuseppe Petrelli (Nisibis)
- Successor: Pasquale Gagliardi (Manfredonia e Vieste); Vincenzo Tizzani (Nisibis)

Orders
- Ordination: 23 September 1848
- Consecration: 30 March 1884 by Edward Henry Howard

Personal details
- Born: 15 April 1825; Naples, Kingdom of the Two Sicilies
- Died: 28 March 1909 (aged 83)

Federico Pizza (15 April 1825 – 28 March 1909) was an Italian Roman Catholic prelate. He was the archbishop of Manfredonia e Vieste from 1884 to 1897.
