= Pope Benedict XIII =

Head of the Catholic Church from 1724 to 1730

Servant of God Benedict XIII
- Bishop of Rome
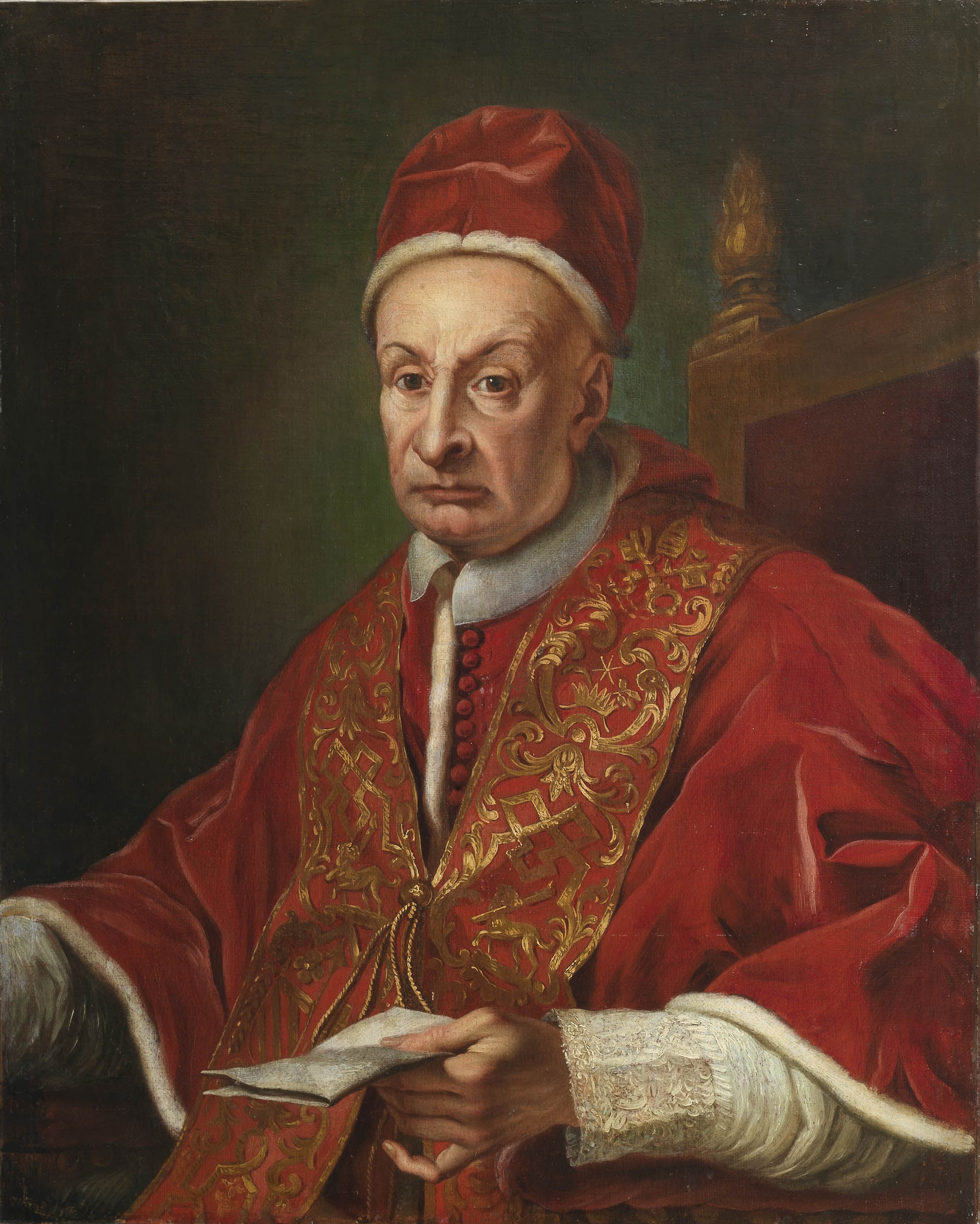
- Portrait, c. 18th century
- Church: Catholic Church
- Papacy began: 29 May 1724
- Papacy ended: 21 February 1730
- Predecessor: Innocent XIII
- Successor: Clement XII
- Previous posts: Cardinal-Priest of San Sisto (1672–1701); Bishop of Manfredonia (1675–1680); Bishop of Cesena (1680–1686); Archbishop of Benevento (1686–1730); Apostolic Administrator of Benevento (1686–1730); Cardinal-Bishop of Frascati (1701–1715); Cardinal-Bishop of Porto e Santa Rufina (1715–1724); Vice-Dean of the College of Cardinals (1715–1724)

Orders
- Ordination: 24 February 1671 by Clement X
- Consecration: 3 February 1675 by Paluzzo Paluzzi Altieri Degli Albertoni
- Created cardinal: 22 February 1672 by Clement X

Personal details
- Born: Pietro Francesco Orsini; 2 February 1649 Gravina in Puglia, Kingdom of Naples
- Died: 21 February 1730 (aged 81) Rome, Papal States
- Coat of arms: Benedict XIII's coat of arms

Ordination history
History
Priestly ordination
- Ordained by: Clement X
- Date: 24 February 1671
Episcopal consecration
- Principal consecrator: Paluzzo Card. Paluzzi (Card. Nep.)
- Co-consecrators: Stefano Brancaccio (Vit. & Tusc.) and Costanzo Zani (Imola)
- Date: 3 February 1675
Cardinalate
- Elevated by: Clement X
- Date: 22 February 1672
Episcopal succession
Bishops consecrated by Pope Benedict XIII as principal consecrator
- Tiberio Muscettola: 19 May 1680
- Domenico Diez de Aux: 13 November 1689
- Fabrizio Cianci: 30 November 1689
- Marcello Cavalieri: 15 January 1690
- Giuseppe Rosa: 22 January 1690
- Giuseppe Ponzi: 22 January 1690
- Pietro Vecchia: 12 March 1690
- Benedict XIV: 16 July 1724

Pope Benedict XIII (Latin: Benedictus XIII; Italian: Benedetto XIII; 2 February 1649 – 21 February 1730), born Pietro Francesco (or Pierfrancesco) Orsini and later called Vincenzo Maria Orsini, was head of the Catholic Church and leader of the Papal States from 29 May 1724 to his death in February 1730.

A Dominican friar, Orsini focused on his religious responsibilities as bishop rather than on papal administration. Orsini's lack of political expertise led him to increasingly rely on an unscrupulous secretary (Cardinal Niccolò Coscia) whose financial abuses ruined the papal treasury, causing great damage to the Church in Rome.

In the process towards sainthood, his cause for canonization opened in 1755, but it was closed shortly afterwards. It was reopened on 21 February 1931, but it was closed once again in 1940. It was opened once more on 17 January 2004, with the official process commencing in 2012 and concluding later in 2017. He now has the posthumous title of Servant of God.

== Early life ==
Pietro Francesco was born in Gravina in Puglia, the eldest of six sons of Ferdinando III Orsini, 8th Duke of Gravina, and Giovanna della Tolfa. A member of the Orsini of Rome, he was the third and last member of that family to become Pope after Pope Celestine III and Pope Nicholas III. At the age of eighteen he resigned his inheritance and entered the Dominican Order where he received the name of "Vincenzo Maria". He was ordained to the priesthood in February 1671.

Pietro lectured in philosophy at Brescia. Through the influence of his family and against his will, he was made a Cardinal by Pope Clement X in 1672. Later he was bishop of Manfredonia, bishop of Cesena and then archbishop of Benevento. After an earthquake in 1688 and another in 1702, he organized relief efforts for the victims. He remained a close friend of a local mystic, Serafina of God.

== Rise to the papacy ==
Upon the death of Pope Innocent XIII in 1724, a conclave was convoked to elect a successor. There were four divisions in the College of Cardinals and there were no clear candidates. At the conclave, Orsini was considered one of the papabili. Orsini was then proposed to be elected because he led a modest, austere life, and was considered to be a pastor. His lack of political expertise suggested that he would be neutral and malleable.

Orsini refused to be elected prior to the final ballot, explaining that he was unworthy of it. Eventually he was persuaded to accept by Agustín Pipia, Master of the Order of Preachers and on 29 May 1724, Orsini was elected pontiff. He chose the regnal name of "Benedict XIII" in honour of Pope Benedict XI because he was also of the Dominican Order.

On 4 June 1724, he was crowned by Benedetto Pamphili, the cardinal protodeacon. On the following 24 September, he took possession of the Basilica of St. John Lateran.

== Pontificate ==
Papal styles of Pope Benedict XIII
- Reference style: His Holiness
- Spoken style: Your Holiness
- Religious style: Holy Father
- Posthumous style: Servant of God

=== Actions ===
Not a man of worldly matters, Benedict XIII made an effort to maintain his monastic lifestyle. He endeavoured to put a stop to the decadent lifestyles of the Italian priesthood and of the cardinalate. He also abolished the lottery in Rome and the Papal States, which only served to profit the neighboring states that maintained the public lottery. A man fond above all of asceticism and religious celebrations, he built several hospitals, but according to Cardinal Prospero Lambertini (later Pope Benedict XIV), "did not have any idea about how to rule".

In 1727, he inaugurated the famous Spanish Steps and founded the University of Camerino.

In 1728, Benedict's intervention settled a controversy regarding the relics of Augustine of Hippo which erupted in Pavia. He ultimately confirmed the authenticity of Augustine's bones, which had been discovered in 1695 in the Basilica San Pietro in Ciel d'Oro.

The government of the Papal States was effectively held in Benedict XIII's stead by Cardinal Niccolò Coscia, who had been the pope's secretary when he was archbishop of Benevento, and who committed a long series of financial abuses to his own advantage, causing the ruin of the Papal treasury. Coscia and his associates effectively isolated Benedict from other advisors. According to Montesquieu, "All the money of Rome goes to Benevento... as the Beneventani direct [Benedict's] weakness".

In foreign relations, he struggled with both John V of Portugal and the Jansenists in France.

=== Beatifications and canonizations ===
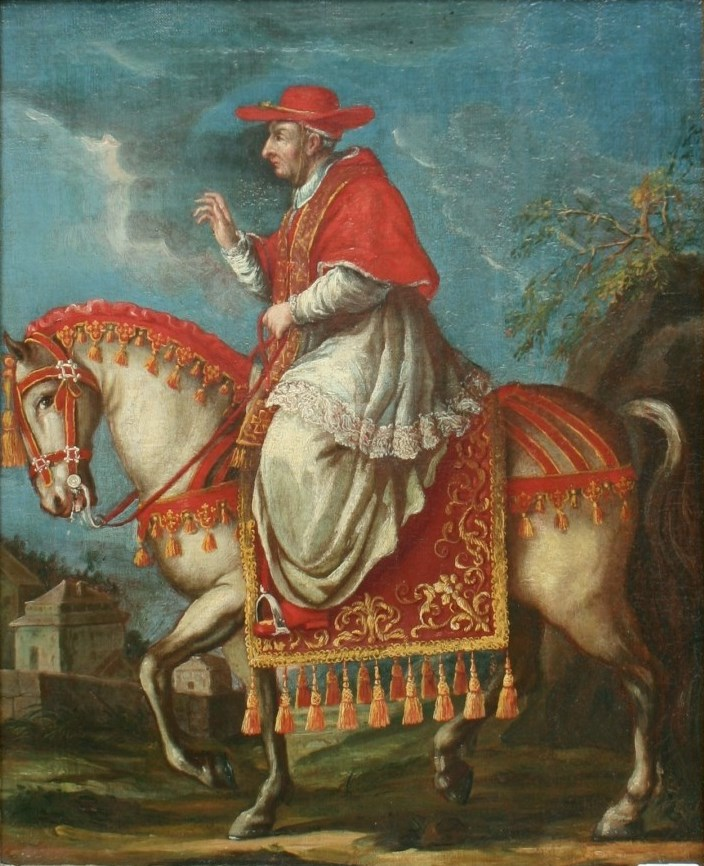
Benedict XIII travelling on horseback, painting by Agostino Masucci

Upon election, on 4 June 1724, Benedict XIII published the Bulls of Canonization for Saints previously celebrated:

1. Isidore the Farmer (Gregory XV - 12 March 1621)
2. Andrew Corsini, Carmelite (Urban VIII - 22 April 1629)
3. Philip Benizi, Servites (Clement X - 12 April 1671)
4. Francis Borgia, Jesuit (Clement X - 12 April 1671)
5. Lawrence Giustiniani (Alexander VIII - 16 October 1690)
6. John of Capistrano (Alexander VIII - 16 October 1690)
7. Catherine of Bologna, Poor Clare Nun (Clement XI - 22 May 1712)
8. Felix of Cantalice, Capuchin (Clement XI - 22 May 1712)

Benedict XIII beatified

1. Bernardine of Feltre in 1728,
2. Peter Fourier on 20 January 1730,
3. Hyacintha of Mariscotti on 1 September 1726,
4. Fidelis of Sigmaringen on 24 March 1729,
5. Vincent de Paul on 13 August 1729, and
6. Juan de Prado on 24 May 1728.

Through the process of equipollent canonization Benedict XIII canonized

1. Pope Gregory VII on 24 May 1728. He conferred sainthood upon
2. Agnes of Montepulciano in 1726,
3. Aloysius Gonzaga and
4. Stanislaus Kostka on 31 December 1726,
5. brothers Boris and Gleb of Kiev in 1724,
6. Francis Solano on 27 March 1726,
7. James of the Marches and Turibius of Mogroveio on 10 December 1726,
8. John of Nepomuk on 19 March 1729,
9. John of the Cross and Peregrine Laziosi on 27 December 1726,
10. Margaret of Cortona on 16 May 1728, and
11. Serapion of Algiers on 14 April 1728.

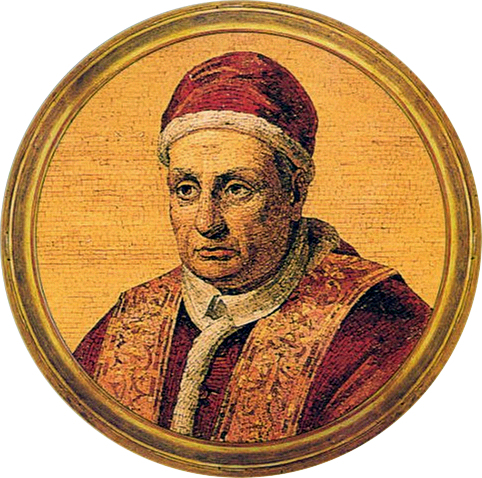
Mosaic of Benedict XIII in the Basilica of St. Paul outside the Walls

==== Doctor of the Church ====
The Pope declared Peter Chrysologus a Doctor of the Church on 19 February 1729.

=== Other activities ===
Benedict XIII elevated 29 new cardinals into the cardinalate in a total of 12 consistories; one such new cardinal was Prospero Lambertini, who later became Pope Benedict XIV.

Benedict XIII, whose orders were descended from Scipione Rebiba, personally consecrated at least 139 bishops for various important European sees, including German, French, English and New World bishops. These bishops in turn consecrated bishops for their respective countries, causing other episcopal lineages to die out. As a result, more than 90% of present-day bishops trace their episcopal lineage through him to Cardinal Rebiba.

With the papal bull Pretiosus, dated 26 May 1727, Benedict XIII granted to all Dominicans major houses of study and in particular to the Roman College of St. Thomas, the future Pontifical University of Saint Thomas Aquinas Angelicum the right of conferring academic degrees in theology to students outside the Order.

== Death and burial ==
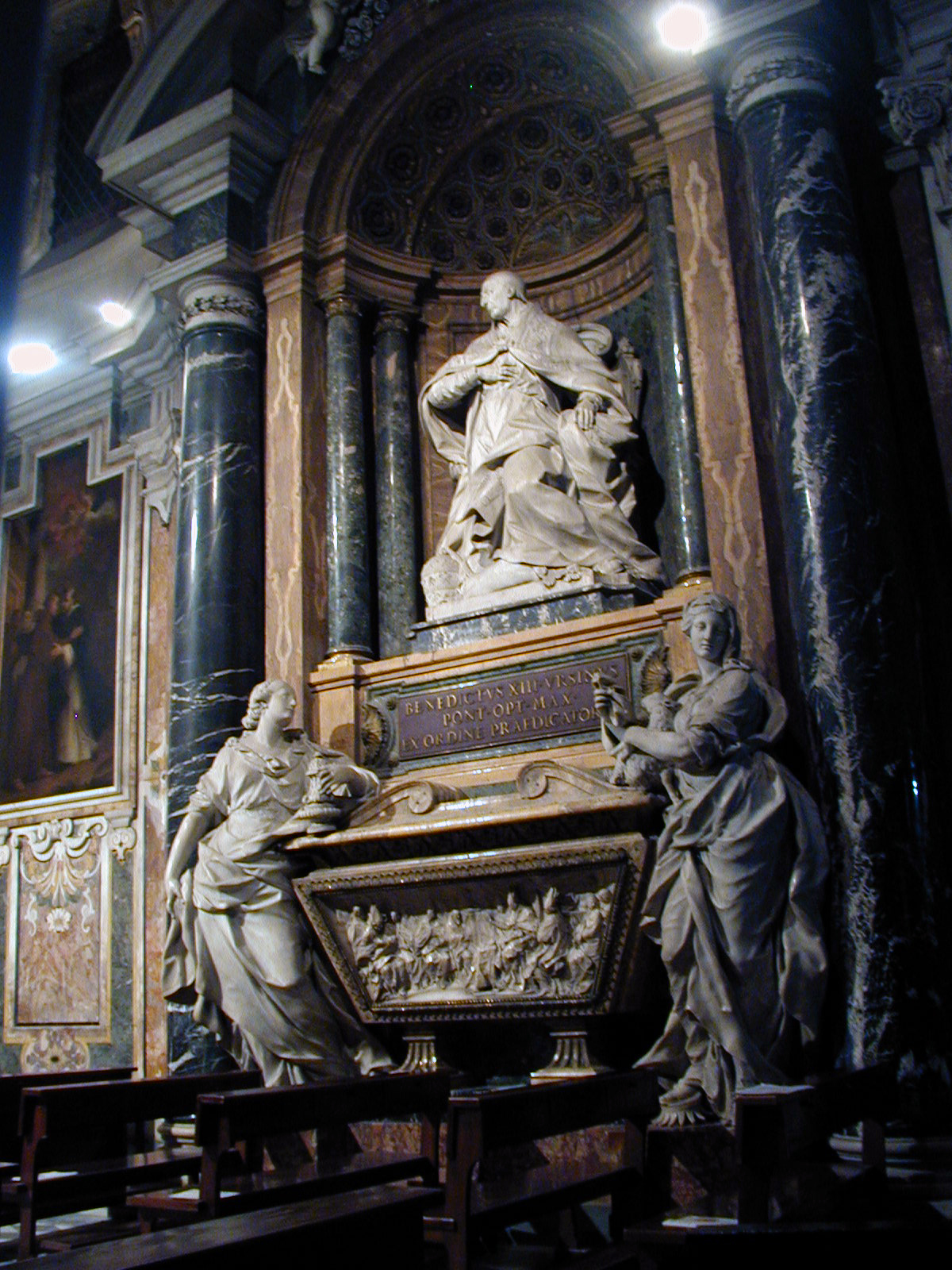
Tomb in Santa Maria sopra Minerva in Rome

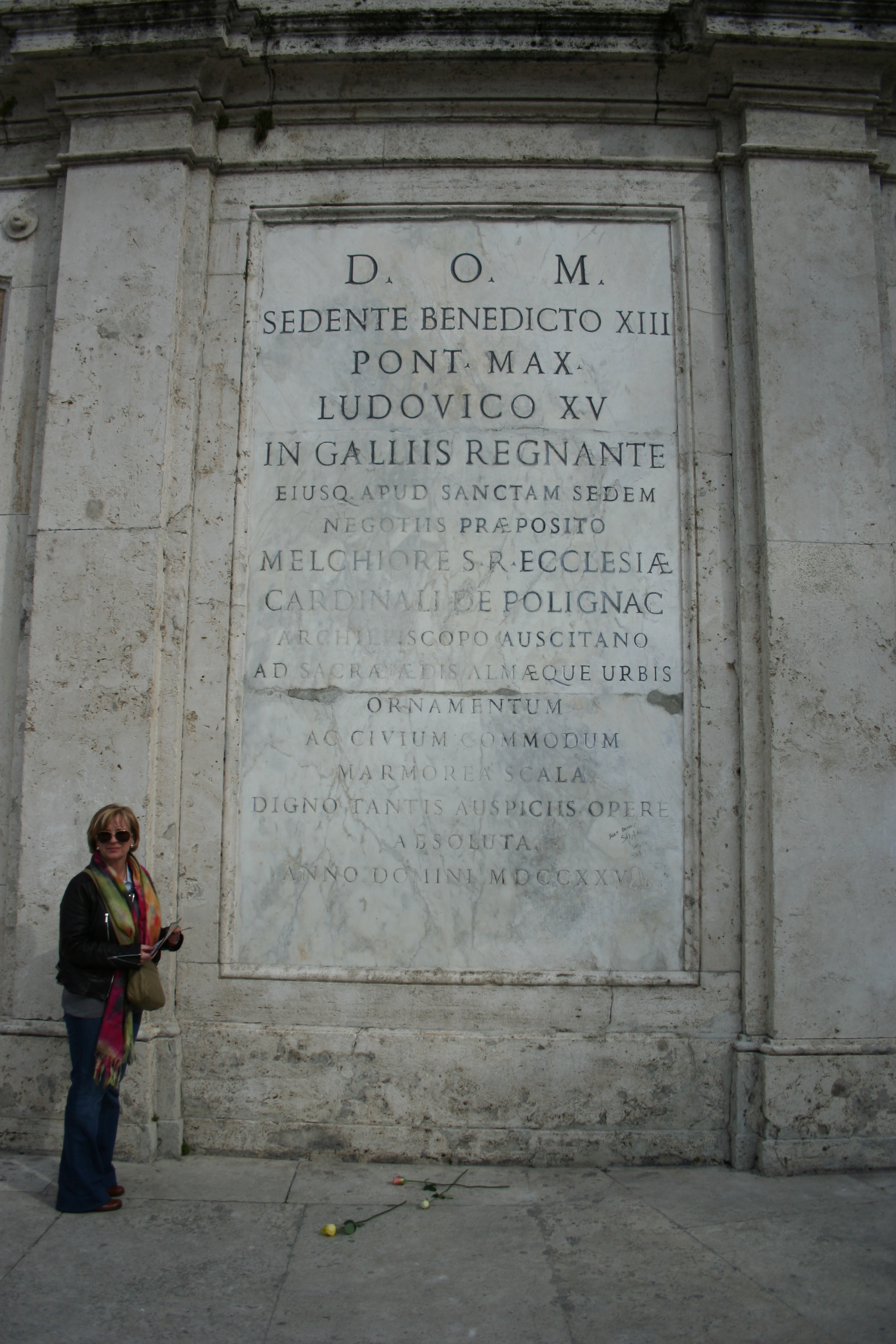
Benedict XIII plaque at the Spanish Steps

Benedict XIII was suddenly attacked by a catarrh, contracted while officiating at the funeral service of Cardinal Marco Antonio Ansidei, of which he died on 21 February 1730 at the age of 81. His death was made public to the people the next day.

The pope was of middling size; his countenance was mild, his nose aquiline and he had a broad forehead. At the autopsy, it was discovered that his heart was remarkably large. His funeral ceremonies were performed at the Vatican, whence he was removed to the Santa Maria sopra Minerva where he was buried in a tomb completed by Pietro Bracci and others.

After the 1730 papal conclave elevated Pope Clement XII to the pontificate, Clement promptly excommunicated Benedict XIII's corrupt deputy, Cardinal Coscia. Coscia fled Rome and his punishment, but was later restored and took part in the conclaves of 1730 and 1740.

Pope Benedict XIV would later say of Benedict XIII: "We respectfully love that pontiff who backed his carriage rather than dispute the passage with a cartman." On that occasion, Benedict XIII had exclaimed to his coachman: "Non ci far impicci" – "Do not involve us in a quarrel." On the other hand, this anonymous satirical comment on Benedict XIII's death was posted at the Pasquino:

"This tomb encloses
the bones of a little friar:
more than a saint's lover
a protector of brigands"

== Cause of beatification ==
Servant of God Benedict XIII
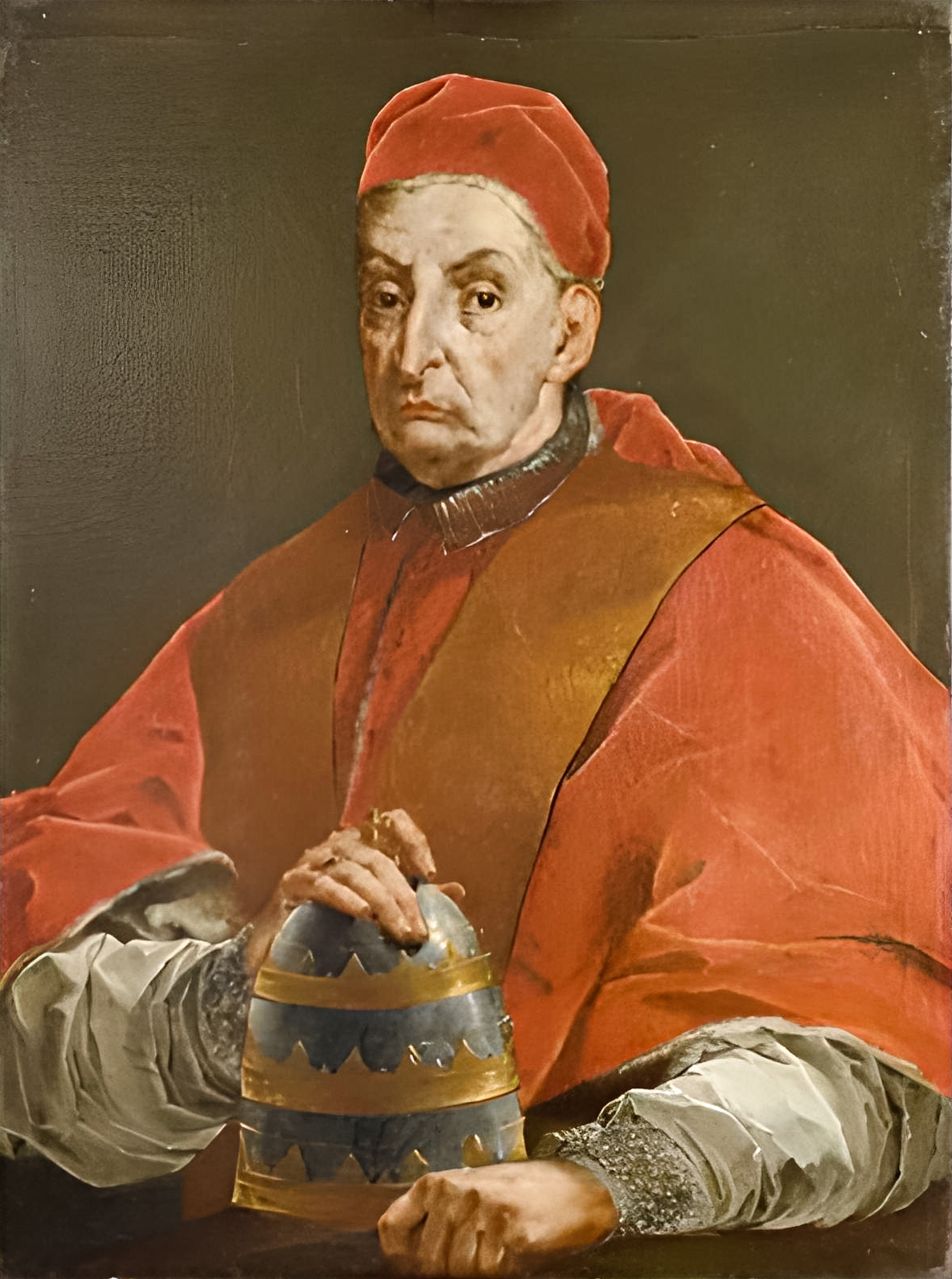
- Portrait by Giuseppe Bazzani, c. 1725
- Born: Pietro Francesco Orsini; 2 February 1649; Gravina in Puglia, Kingdom of Naples
- Died: 21 February 1730 (aged 81); Apostolic Palace, Rome, Papal States

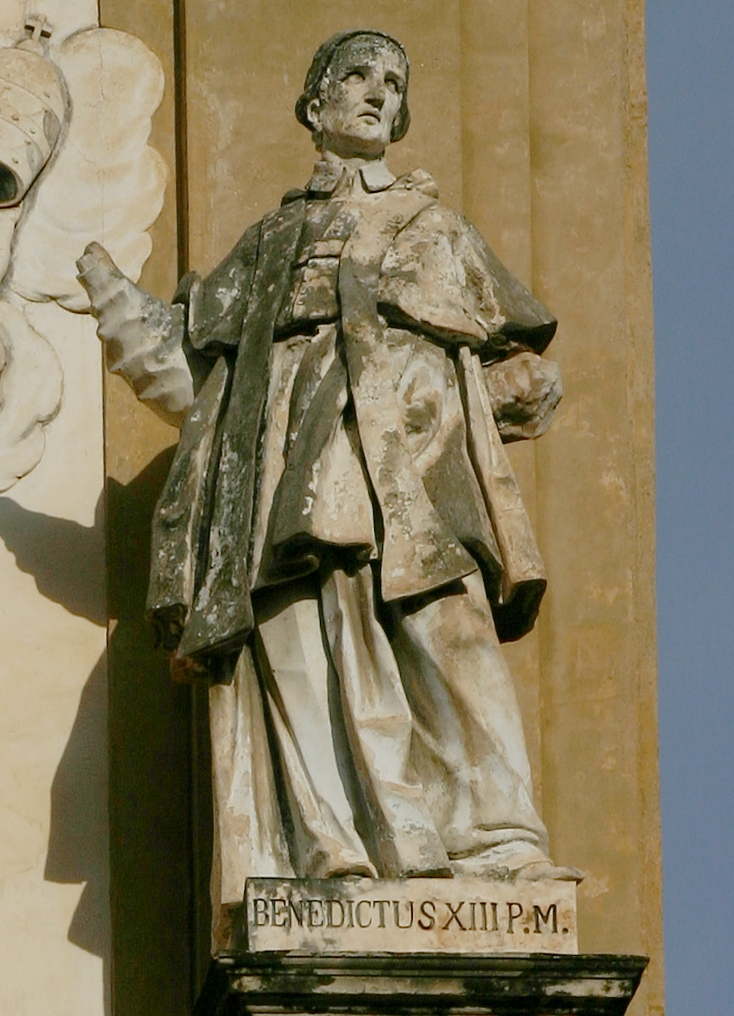
Statue of Pope Benedict XIII in Palermo

The process for his beatification was opened in Tortona in 1755 under Pope Benedict XIV but it did not at all advance and so was stalled. On 21 February 1931, also in Tortona, the process was revitalized but the presumed doubts about the morality of the late pontiff's Cardinal Secretary of State, Niccolò Coscia, caused its closing in 1940.

The process was reopened on 17 January 2004. The official diocesan process commenced in Rome in early 2012 and the official opening of that process was held in the Basilica of Saint John Lateran, presided by Agostino Vallini. The diocesan phase for the beatification process concluded on 24 February 2017 at the Basilica of Saint John Lateran with Vallini celebrating the conclusion of the inquest. He now has the posthumous title of Servant of God.

The current postulator of the cause is the Dominican priest Francesco Maria Ricci.

== See also ==
- Orsini family
- Cardinals created by Benedict XIII
- List of popes

== Sources ==
- Bertelli, Sergio (2001). The King's Body. Translated by Litchfield, R. Burr. The Pennsylvania State University Press. ISBN 0-271-02102-0.
- Herbermann, Charles, ed. (1913). "Pope Benedict XIII" . Catholic Encyclopedia. New York: Robert Appleton Company.
- Kelly, J.N.D. (1989). "Benedict XIII". The Oxford Dictionary of Popes. Oxford University Press. pp. 293–295. ISBN 0-19-282085-0.
- Rendina, Claudio (1993). I papi. Storia e segreti (in Italian). Rome: Newton Compton. ISBN 9788854132603.
- Williams, George L. (1998). Papal Genealogy: The Families and Descendants of the Popes. McFarland & Company, Inc. ISBN 0-7864-2071-5.
- "s: Dizionario Biografico degli Italiani (1966)/Benedetto XIII, papa" in the 1966 Dizionario Biografico degli Italiani.
- Bullarium Romanum. Tomus XXII: Benedictus XIII (ab an 1724–1730). Ed. Taurinensis, 1871.

Catholic Church titles
Preceded by Innocent XIII	Pope; 29 May 1724 – 21 February 1730	Succeeded by Clement XII
