= Matteo Orsini =

Italian Dominican friar and Cardinal

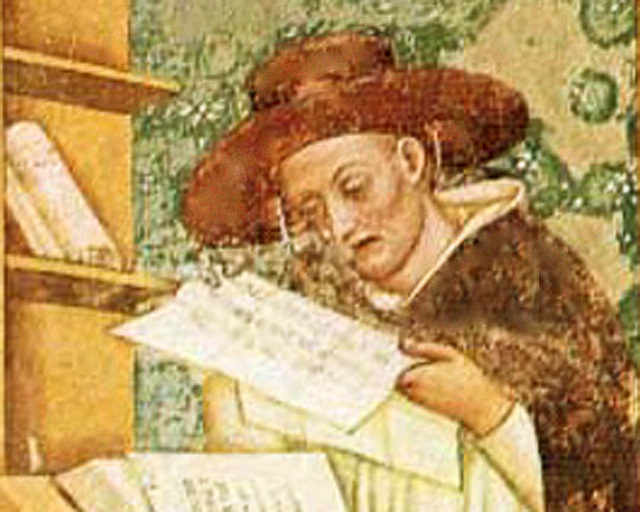
Matteo Orsini

Matteo Orsini (died probably on 18 August 1340) was an Italian Dominican friar and Cardinal.

He was the nephew of Cardinal Francesco Napoleone Orsini (1295–1312), who was himself the nephew of Pope Nicholas III (Giovanni Gaetano Orsini).

His early studies were at Bologna, where he studied law and took the Baccalaureate.

He was canon of the Church of S. Etienne in Châlons sur Saône. He entered the Dominican Order at the Convent of S. Jacques in Paris, around 1294, and completed the full course of theology. He returned to Italy, but the provincial of the Roman Province sent him back to Paris in 1306, where he obtained the degree of Master. He taught biblical studies at Paris, Florence, and Rome. In 1311 he attended the Capitulum Generale in Naples as socius ('companion') of the definitor (elected delegate) of the Roman Province, the provincial Lapus Cerli. In 1314, the Capitulum Generale at London appointed him Vicar for the itinerant preachers of the Order.

After teaching in Paris in 1316, Orsini is held to have taught at the Dominican studium generale at the Convent of Santa Maria sopra Minerva. This would have meant that he was an in-house teacher in a Dominican convent studium: instructors in philosophy were called Lector, instructors in theology were called Magister; he was not a university regent master.

He was prior of the Convent of the Minerva. He won distinction by his zeal for the spread of the order, and was elected provincial of the Roman Province in 1322 in the provincial chapter at Orvieto. In 1323, during a meeting of the chapter of the Roman Province at Città di Castello (Tiferno), he and the definitores were attacked by a deranged novice, Jacobus Dombellinghi, who injured Orsini with his sword. He attended the general chapter of the order at Bordeaux in June 1324. On his return from the general chapter he fell into a serious illness which almost cost him his life. In 1326, Orsini was relieved of his duty as provincial of the Roman Province and succeeded by Bertramus Monaldeschi, who was elected by the General Chapter meeting in Paris. Orsini was appointed vicar for the master general in Italy.

Orsini's service as vicar of the master general was short-lived. On 20 October 1326, the pope named Orsini Bishop of Girgenti (Agrigento), in Sicily, and then, six months later (15 June 1327), transferred him to the archiepiscopal see of Siponto, (Manfredonia, Southern Italy). He arrived in Siponto on 22 April 1327, according to Pompeo Sarnelli, which is completely impossible chronologically, since Orsini was not appointed until 15 June 1327. And in any case he was named a cardinal in December 1327, and on 11 January 1328 a successor to him at Siponto was appointed by Pope John XXII.

In 1326, the difficulties over the office of emperor between the Habsburgs and the Wittelsbach Louis the Bavarian brought increased danger to the city of Rome. The Pope was still hostile to Louis, having excommunicated him repeatedly, and yet Louis intended to be crowned King of the Lombards and Holy Roman Emperor, which involved a visit to Italy and especially Rome. The Romans, fearing that they would be the target of Louis' wrath, wanted the Pope back in Rome. The government authorized the vicars in Rome of King Robert the Wise of Naples, Pandulf Count of Anguillara and Annibaldo de Annibaldis, to write to the Pope, rehearsing the difficulties that Rome was suffering because of the absence of the Pope and Roman Curia, and demanding his immediate return. John XXII wrote to the Romans on 20 January 1327, expressing his loving concern, but also indicating obstacles to a visit. He also wrote to Giacomo Savelli in Rome, urging him to keep the Romans from offering obedience to Louis of Bavaria. The Romans replied with an embassy. While holding the post of provincial of the Roman Province, Orsini was appointed an Ambassador (Orator) of the embassy deputed by the Romans to invite John XXII to transfer his residence back to Rome from Avignon. In answer to Orsini's addresses, the Pope replied to the Romans again in a letter of 8 June 1327, emphasizing the danger that Louis the Bavarian represented, and the impossibility of travelling to Rome just at that time. A second embassy was sent in June, more for form's sake, advising the Pope of what they were going to be compelled to do, than in expectation of action. The expected revolution and change of government in Rome duly took place. Louis the Bavarian entered Rome, and was crowned at Saint Peter's, not by papal authority but by authority of the people of Rome. Despite this political disaster, Pope John XXII never went to Rome.

Pope John XXII made Orsini a cardinal along with nine others at the Consistory of 18 December 1327, and assigned him the titular Church of SS. Giovanni e Paolo on Monte Celio. He was promoted to Cardinal-Bishop of Sabina on 18 December 1338 by Pope Benedict XII (1334–1342). This promotion was a matter of seniority, not virtue or merit.

It is sometimes said that Orsini was Archbishop of Palermo from 1334 to 1338. This is incorrect. His cousin, Giovanni Gaetano Orsini, the incumbent Archbishop since October 1320, did not die until 27 August 1335, and a successor, Archbishop Theobaldus, was appointed by Pope Benedict XII on 24 April 1336. The time span is therefore some eight months, not four or five years, and it was not ended by his promotion to the See of Sabina. As Eubel points out, Orsini was Administrator of the Diocese of Palermo during the Sede Vacante, not the actual Archbishop.

After the death of Cardinal Pierre des Chappes on 24 March 1336, Orsini became prior presbyterorum (protopriest), as a matter of strict seniority and precedence. This was not an office, only a status. In documents issued in the name of the College of Cardinals, however, he was expected to sign and seal the document, along with the senior cardinal-bishop and senior cardinal-deacon. But in his absence, the next most senior cardinal took his place.

Orsini continued, in various ways, to promote the welfare of the Dominican Order, richly endowing the Convent of St. Dominic in Bologna.

Orsini died in Avignon on 18 August 1340, and was buried in the Church of the Dominicans. His body was later transferred to Rome, where it was buried in the sacristy of the Dominican church of S. Maria sopra Minerva. He had built a chapel in honor of Saint Catherine of Siena in that church; Orsini's remains now lie beneath the High Altar of S. Maria sopra Minerva. In 1630, when the sacristy of the church was being renovated, Orsini's remains were moved into the Church, and now lie in the same tomb as Cardinal Latino Malabranca Orsini, next to the statue of the risen Christ, near the high altar.

== Bibliography ==
- Antoine Touron, Histoire des homes illustres de l' Ordre de Saint Dominique Tome II (Paris 1745), 201-210 (in French).
- Pius Thomas Masetti, Monumenta et antiquitates veteris disciplinae Ordinis Praedicatorum I (Romae 1864), pp. 311–317. (in Latin).
- Ferdinand Gregorovius, The History of the City of Rome in the Middle Ages Volume VI (translated by A. Hamilton) (London: George Bell 1906).
- Stefano Forte, "Il cardinal Matteo Orsini OP e il suo testamento," Archivum Fratrum Praedicatorum 37 (1967) 181-276 (in Italian).
- Blake R. Beattie, Angelus Pacis: The Legation of Cardinal Giovanni Gaetano Orsini, 1326–1334 (Leiden: Brill 2007).
