= Furci =

- Comune
- Comune di Furci
- Location within Italy Location within Abruzzo
- Coordinates: 42°0′N 14°35′E
- Country: Italy
- Region: Abruzzo
- Province: Chieti (CH)
- Frazioni: Morelle, Morge, Solagnoli

Area
  - Total: 26 km^{2} (10 sq mi)
- Elevation: 550 m (1,800 ft)

Population (2008)
  - Total: 1,152
  - Density: 44/km^{2} (110/sq mi)
- Demonym: Furcesi
- Time zone: UTC+1 (CET)
  - Summer (DST): UTC+2 (CEST)
- Postal code: 66050
- Dialing code: 0873
- ISTAT code: 069038
- Patron saint: Beato Angelo
- Saint day: 13 September
- Website: www.comunedifurci.com

Furci is a comune and town in the Province of Chieti in the Abruzzo region of Italy.
