= Archdiocese of Manfredonia–Vieste–San Giovanni Rotondo =

Latin Catholic archdiocese in Italy

Coordinates: 41.6333°N 15.9167°E

Archdiocese of Manfredonia–Vieste–San Giovanni Rotondo Archidioecesis Sipontina–Vestana–Sancti Ioannis Rotundi

Catholic
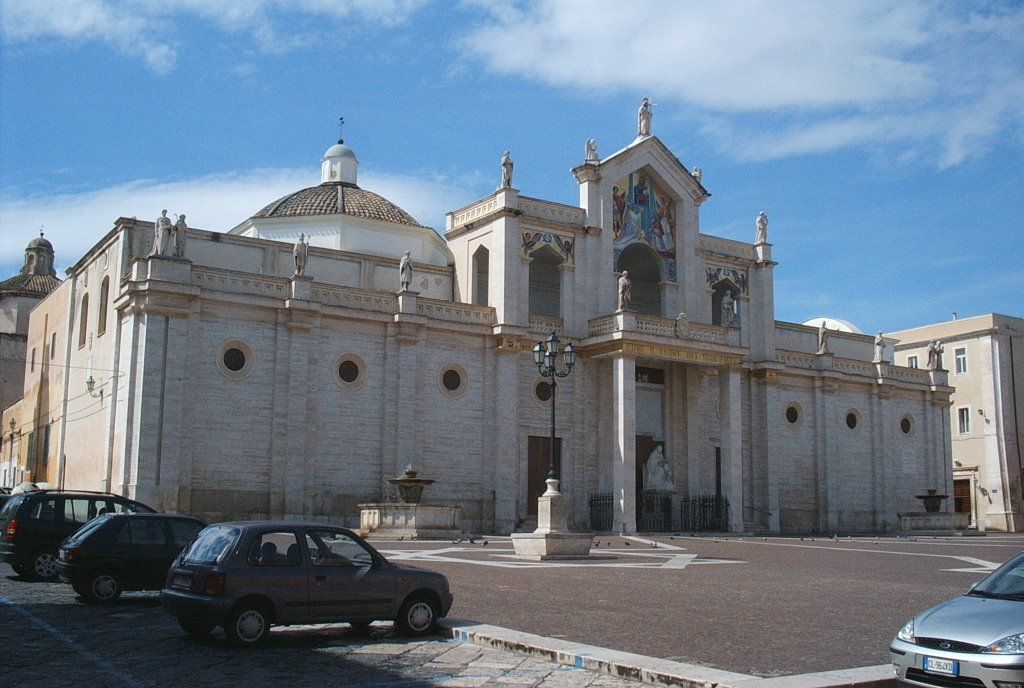
- Cathedral of Manfredonia

Location
- Country: Italy
- Ecclesiastical province: Foggia–Bovino

Statistics
- Area: 1,665 km^{2} (643 sq mi)
- Population: Total; Catholics: (as of 2023); 145,137 ▼; 144,647 ▼ (99.7%)
- Parishes: 50 ▼

Information
- Denomination: Catholic Church
- Sui iuris church: Latin Church
- Rite: Roman Rite
- Established: 3rd Century
- Cathedral: Cattedrale di S. Lorenzo Maiorano (Manfredonia)
- Co-cathedral: Basilica Cattedrale di Maria Santissima Assunta in cielo (Vieste)
- Secular priests: 74 (diocesan) ▲47 (Religious Orders) ▼5 Permanent Deacons ▲

Current leadership
- Pope: Leo XIV
- Archbishop: Franco Moscone

Map
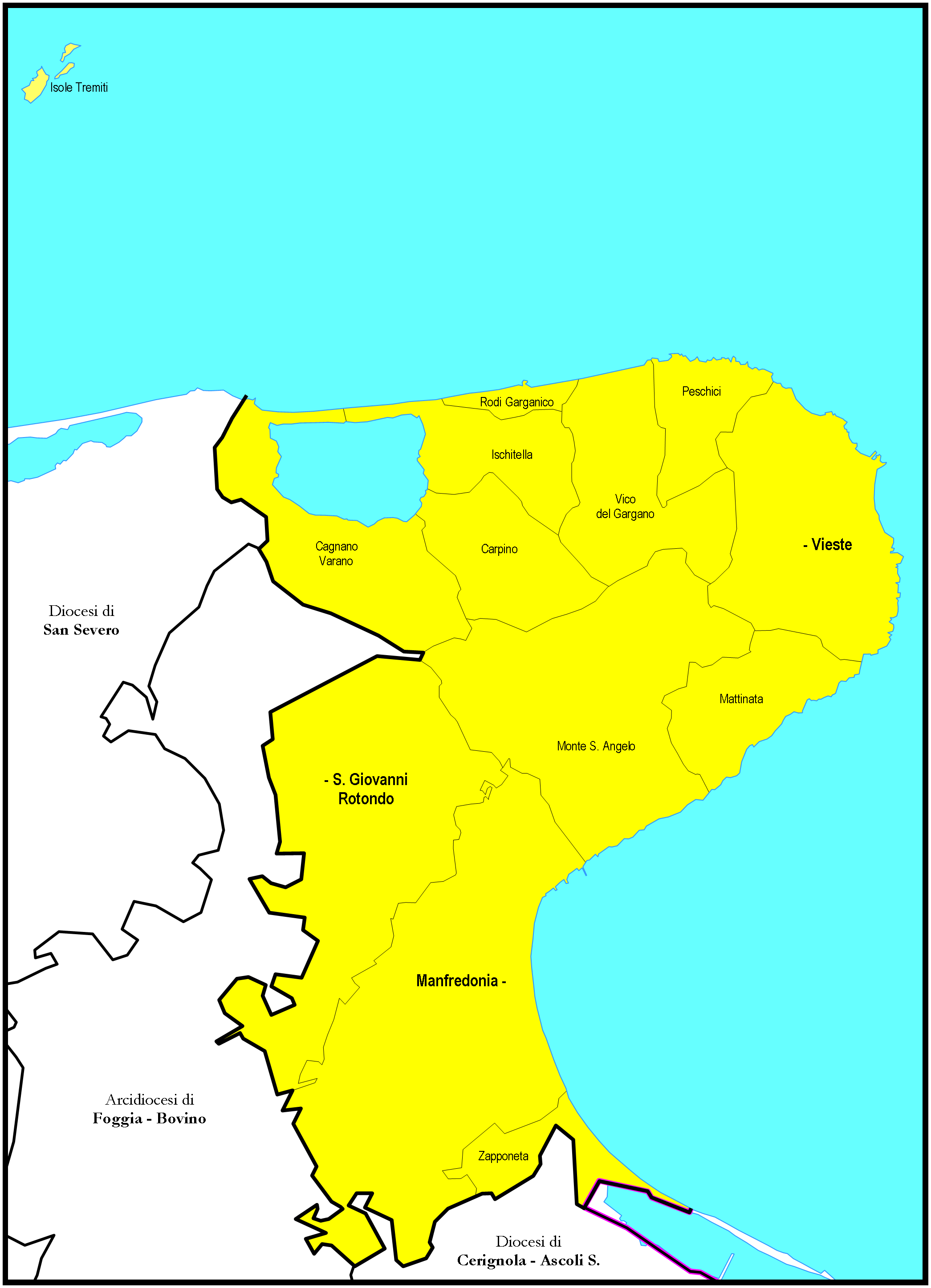

Website
- Archdiocese of Manfredonia (in Italian)

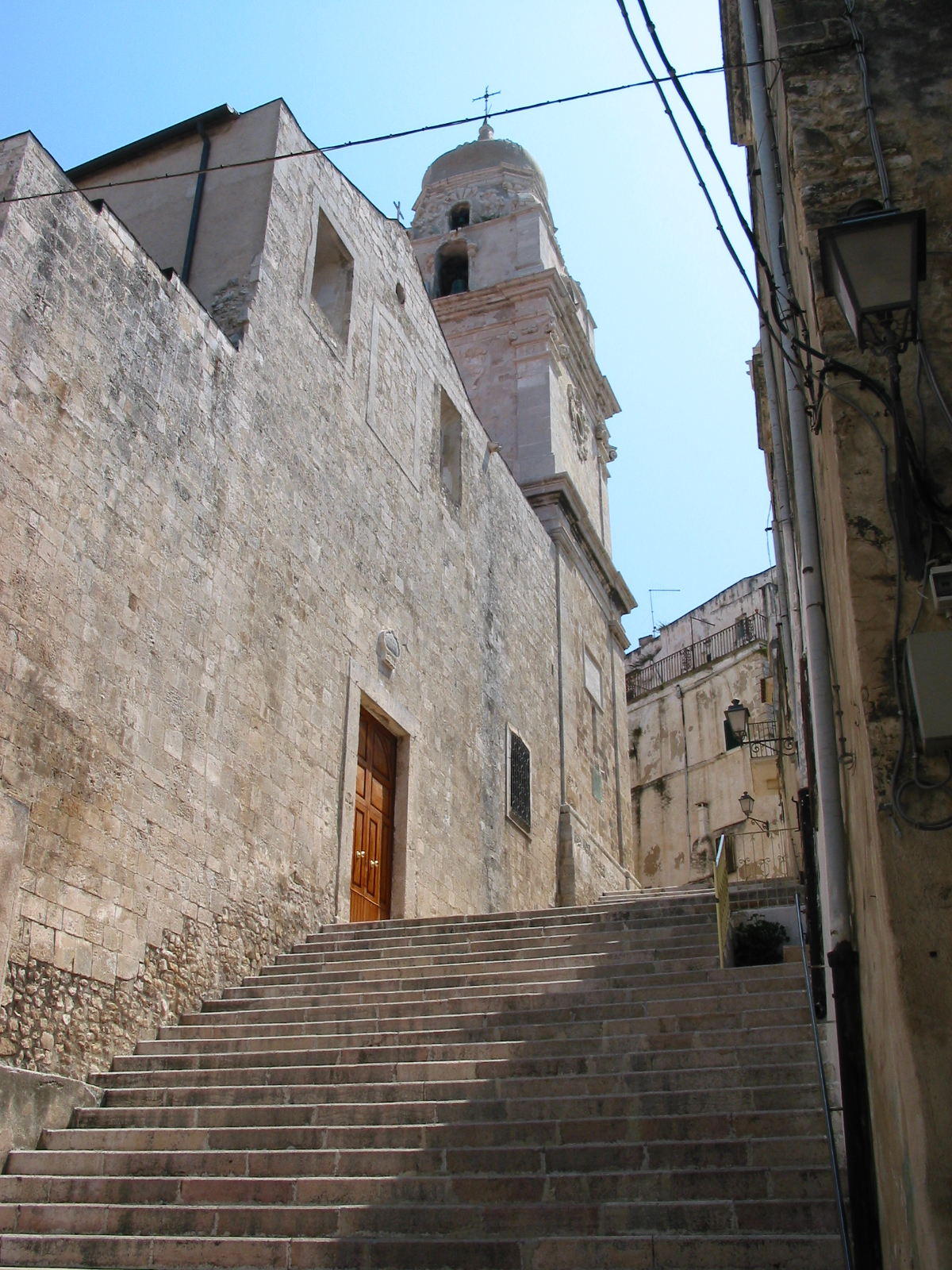
Co-cathedral in Vieste

The Archdiocese of Manfredonia–Vieste–San Giovanni Rotondo (Latin: Archidioecesis Sipontina–Vestana–Sancti Ioannis Rotundi) is a Latin Church non-metropolitan archdiocese of the Catholic Church in the civil province of Foggia, in Apulia, south-eastern Italy, which is part the ecclesiastical province of the Metropolitan Archdiocese of Foggia-Bovino

The historic Archdiocese of Siponto (precursor in a present suburb of Manfredonia) was elevated from the status of diocese in 1074. At that time it was known after its see, Siponto, and Sipontina persisted as its Latin name. The present complex title reflects several mergers, part of a complex history before and after the see transfer in 1230.

== History ==
Pope Eugenius III (1145–1153) confirmed that the diocese of Viesti was a suffragan of the archdiocese of Siponto.

In 1223, a major earthquake centered on Monte Gargano destroyed nearly every building in Siponto. The tremors continued for another two years, until, by 1225, everything was in ruins.

In 1250, Manfred of Sicily found it necessary to rebuild Siponto in a new nearby location, only four miles away, which he named Manfredonia. The archiepiscopal see was transferred and renamed after it as Metropolitan Archdiocese of Manfredonia, yet kept its Latin adjective Sipontin(us). Manfred had been excommunicated both by Pope Innocent IV and by Pope Alexander IV, and the papacy did not care to memorialize his name.

=== Celebrities ===
Among the archbishops were Matteo Orsini (1327), later cardinal; Cardinal Bessarione (1447), administrator; Niccolò Perotti (1458), a Greek scholar and theologian; Giovanni del Monte (1512), later Pope Julius III; Domenico Ginnasio (1586), who suppressed the use of the Greek Rite at the high altar of the cathedral of Sipontum, a custom which had been observed until his time; Antonio Marcello (1643), who founded the seminary and restored the cathedral destroyed by the Ottoman Turks in 1620; Cardinal Vincenzo Orsini (1675), who became Benedict XIII (1724–1730).

=== Earthquake damage ===
In 1627, a major earthquake in the region of Gargano caused a tsunami which inundated the coastline of Apulia, including the city of Manfredonia.

A major earthquake struck the area of Monte Gargano on 31 May 1646. More than 200 persons died on the peninsula, including 85 at Vieste, and hundreds of houses were ruined, as well as the castle and bell tower in Vieste. In Manfredonia, only five houses were destroyed and 15 persons died. The convent of the Observant Franciscans just outside the city walls, which was being rebuilt following the Turkish depredations of 1620, was completely ruined.

=== Reorganization of the Kingdom of the Two Sicilies, 1818 ===
Following the extinction of the Napoleonic Kingdom of Italy, the Congress of Vienna authorized the restoration of the Papal States and the Kingdom of The Two Sicilies (Naples). Since the French occupation had seen the abolition of many Church institutions in the Kingdom, as well as the confiscation of much Church property and resources, it was imperative that Pope Pius VII and King Ferdinand IV reach agreement on restoration and restitution.

A concordat was finally signed on 16 February 1818, and ratified by Pius VII on 25 February 1818. Ferdinand issued the concordat as a law on 21 March 1818. The right of the king to nominate the candidate for a vacant bishopric was recognized, as in the Concordat of 1741, subject to papal confirmation (preconisation). On 27 June 1818, Pius VII issued the bull De Ulteriore, in which he reestablished the metropolitan archbishopric of Siponto (Manfredonia), but with no suffragan dioceses at all. The diocese of Viesti was given to the archbishop of Siponto in "perpetual administratorship".

On 30 April 1979, Pope John Paul II undertook the reorganization of the dioceses of the region of Apulia. The diocese of Foggia was promoted to the status of metropolitan archbishopric, and the metropolitan archdiocese of Siponto was abolished. Foggia became an ecclesiastical province; its suffragans were to be Siponto (which retained the dignity of an archiepiscopal seat); Troia (which had been immediately subject to the Holy See); Asculum et Ceriniola, Bovinum, Lucerina, and San Severo (which had been suffragans of the archdiocese of Benevento); and Vieste (which had been a suffragan of Siponto, and became an independent diocese again).

=== Diocesan Reorganization ===
Following the Second Vatican Council, and in accordance with the norms laid out in the council's decree, Christus Dominus chapter 40, Pope Paul VI ordered a reorganization of the ecclesiastical provinces in southern Italy. Pope Paul VI ordered consultations among the members of the Congregation of Bishops in the Vatican Curia, the Italian Bishops Conference, and the various dioceses concerned.

On 18 February 1984, the Vatican and the Italian State signed a new and revised concordat. Based on the revisions, a set of Normae was issued on 15 November 1984, which was accompanied in the next year, on 3 June 1985, by enabling legislation. According to the agreement, the practice of having one bishop govern two separate dioceses at the same time, aeque personaliter, was abolished. The Vatican continued consultations which had begun under Pope John XXIII for the merging of small dioceses, especially those with personnel and financial problems, into one combined diocese.

On 30 September 1986, Pope John Paul II ordered that the dioceses of Siponto and Viesti be merged into one diocese with one bishop, with the Latin title Archidioecesis Sipontina-Vestana. The seat of the diocese was to be in Manfredonia, and its cathedral was to serve as the cathedral of the merged diocese. The cathedral in Viesti was to have the honorary titles of "co-cathedral"; the cathedral Chapter was to be a Capitulum Concathedralis. There was to be only one diocesan Tribunal, in Manfredonia, and likewise one seminary, one College of Consultors, and one Priests' Council. The territory of the new diocese was to include the territory of the suppressed dioceses of Viesti. The town of Rignano Garganico, however, was detached from the diocese, and assigned to the diocese of S. Severo.

On 6 December 2002, the archdiocese was again renamed. By order of Pope John Paul II, it became Archdiocese of Manfredonia–Vieste–San Giovanni Rotondo / Sipontina-Vestana-Sancti Ioannis Rotundi (Latin). The stated reason for the change was the desire to honor S. Pius of Pietrelcina, who had founded a hospital for the suffering (Casa Sollievo della Sofferenza) in the city of San Giovanni Rotundo.

=== Cathedrals ===
The medieval cathedral, damaged many times by earthquakes, survived until the Turkish invasion of 1620. At that time, the entire city was sacked and put to the torch, and the cathedral completely destroyed. The new cathedral of the archiepiscopal see, whose reconstruction began under Archbishop Antonio Marullo (1643–1648), is the Cathedral of Saint Laurence, dedicated to Laurence of Siponto.

The archdiocese also has:

- a Co-Cathedral, or Minor Basilica: Basilica Cattedrale di Maria Santissima Assunta in cielo, in Vieste, granted the title of co-cathedral by Pope John Paul II on 12 February 1981.
- another former Cathedral, also a Minor Basilica, is the Basilica di S. Maria Maggiore di Siponto, in Siponto
- a third Minor Basilica, the Basilica S. Michele Arcangelo dedicated to the Archangel Michael, in Monte Sant'Angelo, is a World Heritage Site.
- two more notable shrines: Santuario di S. Maria delle Grazie, in San Giovanni Rotondo, and Santuario di S. Pio da Pietrelcina, in San Giovanni Rotondo.

=== Synods ===
Cardinal Tolomeo Gallio (1562–1573) held a provincial synod in January 1567, in Manfredonia. Archbishop Bernardino Buratti (1623–1628) held diocesan synods in 1624 and 1627. Cardinal Vincenzo Maria (Pietro Francesco) Orsini de Gravina, O.P. (1675–1680) presided over a diocesan synod in 1678.

Archbishop Tommaso Maria Francone, C.R. (1777–1799) presided over a diocesan synod on 11–12 May 1784.

== Archbishops of Siponto ==
- Albertus, Benedictine Order (O.S.B.) (1100 – 1116)
- Gregorius, O.S.B. (1116 – 1117.09.21)
- Leo (1118 – 1130?)
- Willelmus (attested 1120–1124)
- Sergio Freccia (1130? – 1140?)
- Guglielmo (1140? – 1155?)
- Goffridus (1155 – 1166)
- Gerardus (1170 – death 1175)
- ?Gerardus II (1175 – 1179?)
- Johannes (1184 – death 1195)
- Hugo (1195 – 1216?)
- Albertus (1219? – ?)

=== Metropolitan Archbishops of Siponto (Manfredonia) ===
==== From 1230 to 1500 ====
- Ruggero (attested 1219 – 1263?)
- Jacobus Falconarius (attested 1259 – 1269)
- Giovanni Freccia (attested 1277–1283)
- Andrea De China (1291.12.05 – death 1301)
- Gregorio de Montelongo (1301.09.01 – death 1302.01)
- Leonardo Mancini (1302.02.09 – death 1326)
- Matteo Orsini, O.P. (1327)
- Bartolommeo (1328 – 1330)
- Sassus Judicis Leonis (1330 – 1343)
- Petrus, O.Min. (1343 – 1351)
- Franciscus Crispi da Messana, 0.E.S.A. (1351 – 1354)
- Marinus (1354 – 1361)
- Philippus (Feolus) (1361 – 1375)
- Petrus, O.Carm. (1375 – 1381) Avignon Obedience
- Johannes (1381 – 1386) Roman Obedience
- Johannes (1386 – 1398) Roman Obedience
- Nicolaus (1398 – 1402) Roman Obedience
- Nicolaus (1402 – 1410) Roman Obedience
- Laurentius (1410 – 1414?)
- Paolo di Segni (1414–1419)

...

- Matthias Foschi (1436 – 1438)
- Angelo Capranica (17 March 1438 – 1447)
- Basilios Bessarion, (O.S.B.M.) (1447 – 1449 Resigned)
- Giovanni Burgio, (7 Apr 1449 – 1458)
- Niccolò Perotti, (19 Oct 1458 – 1480)
- Tiberio Nardini, (12 Jan 1481 – 1498)

==== from 1500 to 1818 ====
- Agapito Gerardini, (4 May 1500 – 1506)
- Antonio Maria Ciocchi del Monte (6 Feb 1506 – 1511)
- Giovanni Maria Ciocchi del Monte (18 March 1513 – 25 June 1544 Resigned)
- Giovanni Ricci (25 June 1544 – 1545)
- Giovanni Andrea Mercurio (20 Feb 1545 – 1550)
- Sebastiano Antonio Pighini (1550 – 1553)
- Dionisio de Robertis, O.S.M. (30 March 1554 – 1560 Died)
- Bartolomé de la Cueva y Toledo (13 Sep 1560 – 29 June 1562 Died)
- Tolomeo Gallio (6 July 1562 – 1573 Resigned)
- Giuseppe Sappi (8 April 1573 – 1586 Died)
- Domenico Ginnasi (17 Dec 1586 – 11 Nov 1607 Resigned)
- Annibale Ginnasi (5 Nov 1607 – 1621 Died)
- Giovanni Severini (14 March 1622 – 20 Dec 1622 Died)
- Bernardino Buratti (1623 – 1628)
- Andrea Caracciolo (1628 – 1629)
- Orazio Annibaldi della Molara (18 Feb 1630 – 7 May 1643 Died)
- Antonio Marullo (31 Aug 1643 – 18 Dec 1648 Died)
- Paolo Teutonico (12 April 1649 – Nov 1651 Died)
- Giovanni Alfonso Puccinelli, C.R.L. (13 May 1652 – 1658 Died)
- Benedetto Cappelletti (22 Sep 1659 – 27 Jan 1675 Resigned)
- Pietro Francesco Orsini de Gravina, O.P. (1675 – 1680)
- Tiberio Muscettola, C.O. (1680 – 1708 Resigned)
- Giovanni de Lerma (1708 – 1725 Resigned)
- Marco Antonio De Marco (1725 – 1742)
- Francesco Rivera (1742 – 1777)
- Tommaso Maria Francone, C.R. (23 June 1777 – 1799)
- Giovanni Gaetano del Muscio, Sch.P. (1804 – 1807)

Sede vacante (1807 – 1818)

=== Archbishops of Manfredonia e Vieste ===
United: 27 June 1818 with the Diocese of Vieste

- Eustachio Dentice, C.R. (6 April 1818 Confirmed – 1830 Died)
- Vitangelo Salvemini (2 July 1832 Confirmed – 13 May 1854 Died)
- Vincenzo Taglialatela (Tagliatela) (23 June 1854 – 7 Dec 1879 Retired)
- Beniamino Feuli (27 Feb 1880 – 19 Jan 1884 Died)
- Federico Pizza (24 March 1884 – 19 April 1897 Resigned)
- Pasquale Gagliardi (19 April 1897 – 1 Oct 1929 Resigned)
- Andrea Cesarano (30 June 1931 – 20 Dec 1969 Died)
- Valentino Vailati (25 May 1970 – 2 June 1990 Retired)

=== Archbishops of Manfredonia-Vieste ===
30 September 1986: Name Changed

- Vincenzo D'Addario (1990–2002)

=== Archbishops of Manfredonia–Vieste–San Giovanni Rotondo ===
6 December 2002: Name Changed

- Domenico Umberto D’Ambrosio (2003–2009)
- Michele Castoro (15 July 2009 – 5 May 2018 died)
- Franco Moscone, C.R.S. (2018–)

== See also ==
- List of Catholic dioceses in Italy
- Roman Catholic Diocese of Vieste
- Siponto [Bishops of Siponto, before promotion to archbishops]

== Bibliography ==
=== Episcopal lists ===
- Eubel, Conradus, ed. (1913). Hierarchia catholica (in Latin). Vol. I (second ed.). Münster: Libreria Regensbergiana.
- Eubel, Conradus, ed. (1914). Hierarchia catholica (in Latin). Vol. II (second ed.). Münster: Libreria Regensbergiana.
- Eubel, Conradus; Gulik, Guilelmus (1923). Hierarchia catholica (in Latin). Vol. III (second ed.). Münster: Libreria Regensbergiana.
- Gams, Pius Bonifatius (1873). Series episcoporum Ecclesiae catholicae: quotquot innotuerunt a beato Petro apostolo (in Latin). Ratisbon: Typis et Sumptibus Georgii Josephi Manz. pp. 852–853.
- Gauchat, Patritius (Patrice) (1935). Hierarchia catholica (in Latin). Vol. IV (1592-1667). Münster: Libraria Regensbergiana.
- Ritzler, Remigius; Sefrin, Pirminus (1952). Hierarchia catholica medii et recentis aevi (in Latin). Vol. V (1667-1730). Patavii: Messagero di S. Antonio.
- Ritzler, Remigius; Sefrin, Pirminus (1958). Hierarchia catholica medii et recentis aevi (in Latin). Vol. VI (1730-1799). Patavii: Messagero di S. Antonio.
- Ritzler, Remigius; Sefrin, Pirminus (1968). Hierarchia Catholica medii et recentioris aevi (in Latin). Vol. VII (1800–1846). Monasterii: Libreria Regensburgiana.
- Remigius Ritzler; Pirminus Sefrin (1978). Hierarchia catholica Medii et recentioris aevi (in Latin). Vol. VIII (1846–1903). Il Messaggero di S. Antonio.
- Pięta, Zenon (2002). Hierarchia catholica medii et recentioris aevi (in Latin). Vol. IX (1903–1922). Padua: Messagero di San Antonio. ISBN 978-88-250-1000-8.

=== Studies ===
- Cappelletti, Giuseppe (1870). Le chiese d'Italia: dalla loro origine sino ai nostri giorni (in Italian). Vol. vigesimo (20). Venezia: G. Antonelli. pp. 577–594.
- D'Avino, Vincenzo (1848). Cenni storici sulle chiese arcivescovili, vescovili, e prelatizie (nulluis) del Regno delle Due Sicilie (in Italian). Napoli: Ranucci.
- Kamp, Norbert (1975). Kirche und Monarchie im staufischen Königreich Sizilien: I. Prosopographische Grundlegung, Bistumer und Bistümer und Bischöfe des Konigreichs 1194–1266: 2. Apulien und Calabrien München: Wilhelm Fink 1975.
- Kehr, Paulus Fridolin (1962). Italia pontificia. Regesta pontificum Romanorum. Vol. IX: Samnia – Apulia – Lucania. Berlin: Weidmann. (in Latin). pp. 268–270.
- Ughelli, Ferdinando; Coleti, NIccolo (1721). Italia sacra sive De episcopis Italiæ, et insularum adjacentium (in Latin). Vol. Tomus septimus (7). Venice: apud Sebastianum Coleti. pp. 810–865.
- Raccolta di Diplomi e Bolle per la Chiesa sipontina. n.p: n.d.
