= Augustalis (disambiguation) =

Augustalis (Latin for "imperial, belonging to/representing the Augustus"), may refer to:

- Augustalis, a medieval coin
- the day of the Augustalia
- those who led the first ranks of an army
- certain Roman magistrates in cities
- any one of the officers of the Emperor's palace
- one of the priests who oversaw the games performed in honor of Augustus; see Sodales Augustales
- flamen Augustalis, the flamen of the deified Augustus
- Praefectus augustalis, the governor of Egypt
- Threnodia Augustalis, a poem by John Dryden on the death of Charles II
- Liber Augustalis, or the Constitutions of Melfi
- Augustalis (bishop), the first bishop of Toulon, according to some sources, and possibly also the author of a tract calculating the date of Easter
- Mermessus augustalis, a species of spider in the genus Mermessus
