= Assizes of Capua =

1220 legislative act of Sicily

The Assizes of Capua were the first of three great legislative acts of the kingdom of Sicily of Frederick II of Sicily, Holy Roman Emperor. They were the first, promulgated at Capua in 1220, before the Assizes of Messina on 1221 and the Constitutions of Melfi of 1231.

The Assizes were promulgated on the mainland of the realm as they were a reform of the Assizes of Ariano, promulgated by Frederick's grandfather Roger II in 1140 at Ariano Irpino, nearby to Capua. The intent was, as in the previous Assizes and his coming Constitutions, the strengthening of the royal power in the kingdom, usually at the expense of the nobility. From Frederick II's perspective, this was "a sort of practical conservatism ... by sweeping aside the abuses of the last 22 years...."

== Provisions ==
Some important provisions included:

- The Crown controlled fiefs.
- Barons had to gain approval of their marriages.
- Subinfeudation had to be approved by the king.
- Privileges granted by Markward von Annweiler and his other predecessors would have to be reviewed, with a substantial fee for renewal.
- Adulterine castles would be reined in.
- New royal customs duties and tariffs on ports and toll roads.
- Restrictions on gambling.
- Jewish people and prostitutes had to wear distinctive clothing.

== See also ==
- Assizes of Messina
- Civil law
- Constitutions of Melfi
- History of Swabian Sicily
- Holy Roman Empire
- Legal history
- Medieval Europe
- Richard of San Germano, chronicler of this and related statutes.

== Bibliography ==
- Carlo Alberto Garufi, Ryccardi de Sancto Germano chronica, 1937, S. 88–93, 94–96.
- Horst Enzensberger (1983). "Capua, Assisen von". Lexikon des Mittelalters, II: Bettlerwesen bis Codex von Valencia (in German). Stuttgart and Weimar: J. B. Metzler. col. 1491–1492. ISBN 3-7608-8902-6.
- Thomas Curtis VanCleve: The Emperor Frederick II of Hohenstaufen. Immutator Mundi. Clarendon Press, Oxford 1972, S. 139–145.
- Hermann Dilcher: Die sizilische Gesetzgebung Kaiser Friedrichs II. Quellen der Constitutionen von Melfi und ihrer Novellen Köln u. a. 1975 (Studien und Quellen zur Welt Kaiser Friedrichs II.,3). S. 18–19: Konkordanzen, weitere Literatur.
