= Castle of Melfi =

Castle in Basilicata, Italy

- Southern Italy
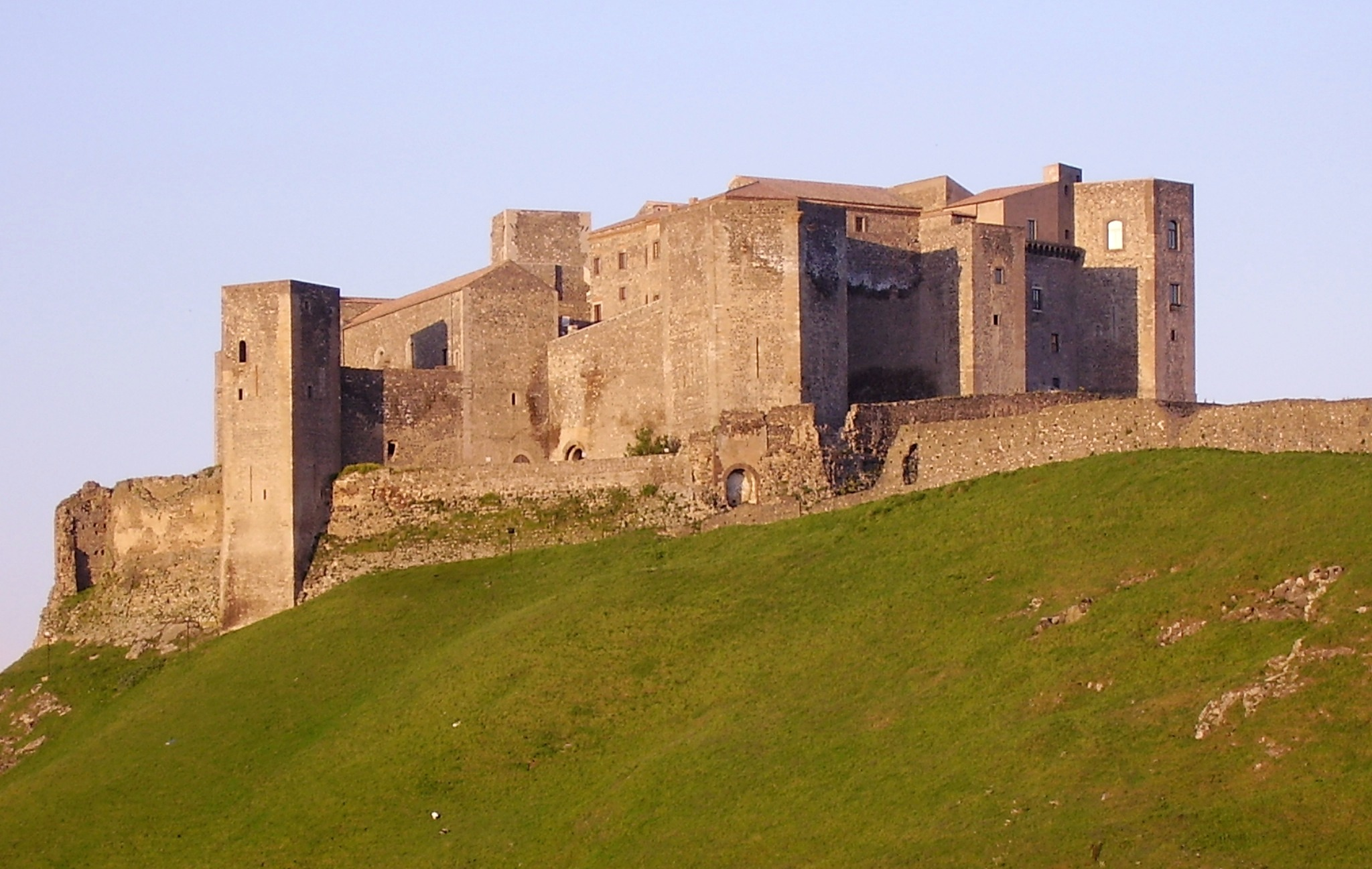
- The Castle of Melfi

Site information
- Open to the public: Yes
- Condition: Preserved

Location
- Coordinates: 40.998334°N 15.653039°E

Site history
- Built: 11th century
- Materials: Limestone, Brick

The Castle of Melfi in Basilicata is a monument owned by the Italian State and one of the most important medieval castles in Southern Italy. Its construction, at least the components still visible, dates back to the Norman conquest and has undergone significant changes over time, especially under the House of Anjou and the Crown of Aragon.

== History ==
=== Normans ===
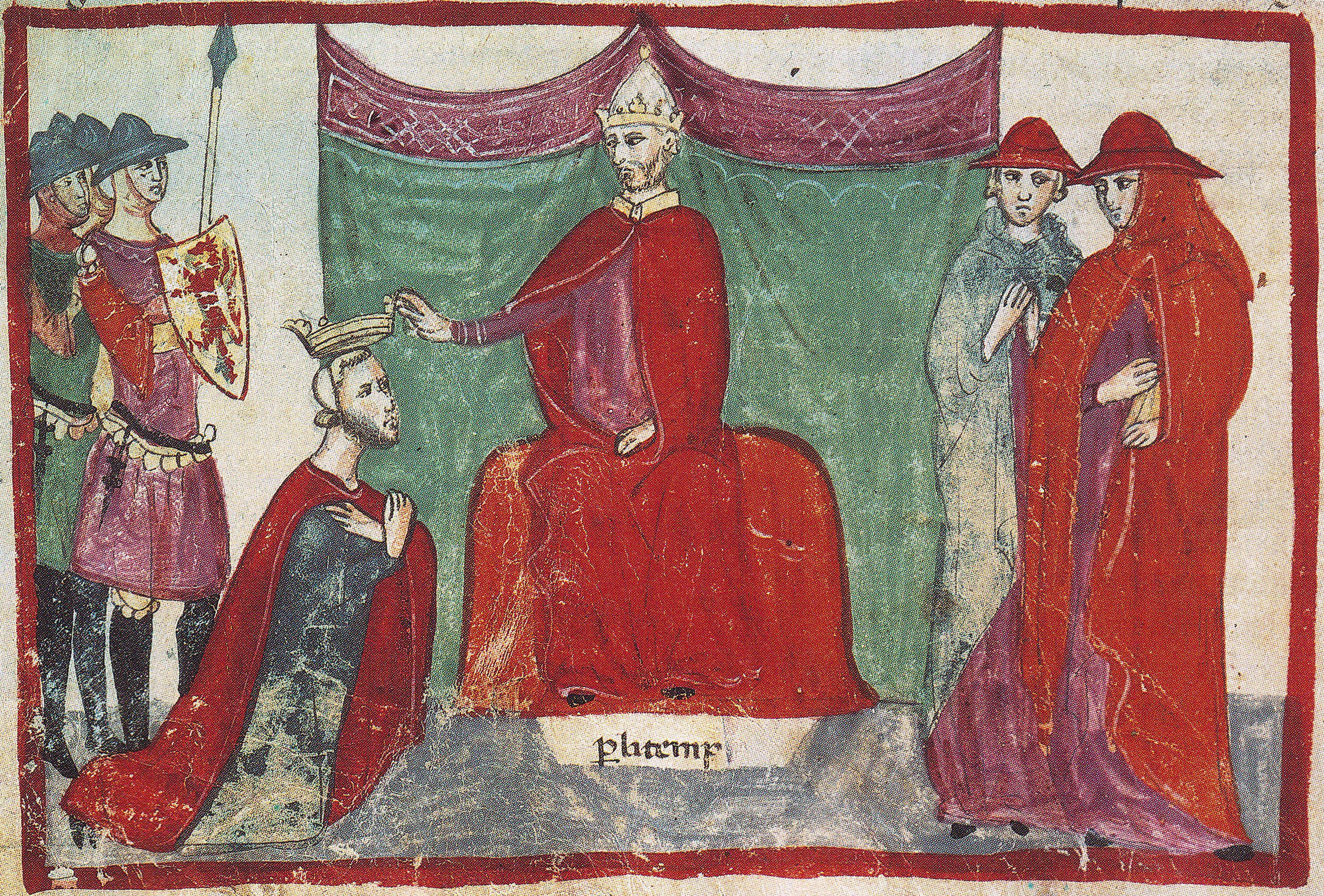
Pope Nicholas II appoints Robert Guiscard Duke of Apulia and Calabria, depiction from the Nuova Cronica by Giovanni Villani, 14th century. The story takes place in the Rocca di Melfi, at the base of the castle.

The castle was built in the late 11th century by the Normans in a strategic location that serves as a gateway between Campania and Apulia. Its placement was essential to defend itself from external attacks and as a refuge for Norman allies. The structure was a place of several "historic" events during the Norman period.

In Melfi, the residential seat of the County of Apulia (Contea di Puglia), there were five ecumenical councils, organized by five different Popes between 1059 and 1137. In the summer of 1059, Pope Nicholas II stayed at the fortress: on 24 June he concluded an agreement with Count Robert Guiscard and Prince Richard I of Capua, in preparation of the First Council of Melfi, which he celebrated there from 3 to 25 August finally recognizing the Norman conquests by the Concordat of Melfi. The Pope named Robert Guiscard Duke of Apulia and Calabria and the town of Melfi on that occasion was promoted to the capital of his duchy. Guiscard had exiled his first wife Alberada of Buonalbergo, to marry the Lombard princess Sikelgaita of Salerno.

Further synods were held at the castle: Pope Alexander II from 1 August 1067 chaired the Second Council of Melfi, received the Lombard prince Gisulf II of Salerno as well as Robert Guiscard and his younger brother Roger I. The Third Council of Melfi, convened in 1089 by Pope Urban II, dealt with church legislation and the relation to the Greek Church, in 1101 Paschal II called the Fourth Council of Melfi IV and finally Innocent II in 1137 celebrated the Fifth Council of Melfi, last of the series. Also in 1130 Antipope Anacletus II, who established the Norman Kingdom of Sicily, organized a Council of Melfi, which however was not recognized by the Church.

=== Hohenstaufen ===
Upon the arrival of the Hohenstaufen dynasty in 1194, Emperor Frederick II gave great importance to the Castle of Melfi, and ordered several modifications. In 1231 he promulgated the Constitutions of Melfi (Liber Augustalis) at the manor, code of laws of the Kingdom of Sicily, to which the emperor personally took part in the writing together with people like his notary Pietro della Vigna and the philosopher and mathematician Michael Scot. The structure was also a deposit for taxes collected in Basilicata and a prison for captives like the "Saracen" Uthman of Lucera, who was released after the payment of 50 ounces of gold.

In 1232, Frederick II hosted in the castle Margrave Boniface II of Montferrat and Bianca Lancia, with whom he had his son Manfred and who became his wife just before her death. After his excommunication by Pope Gregory IX, the Hohenstaufen emperor in 1241 had imprisoned in the building two cardinals and several French and German bishops, who should have been part of a papal council for his dismissal.

=== Anjou and successors ===
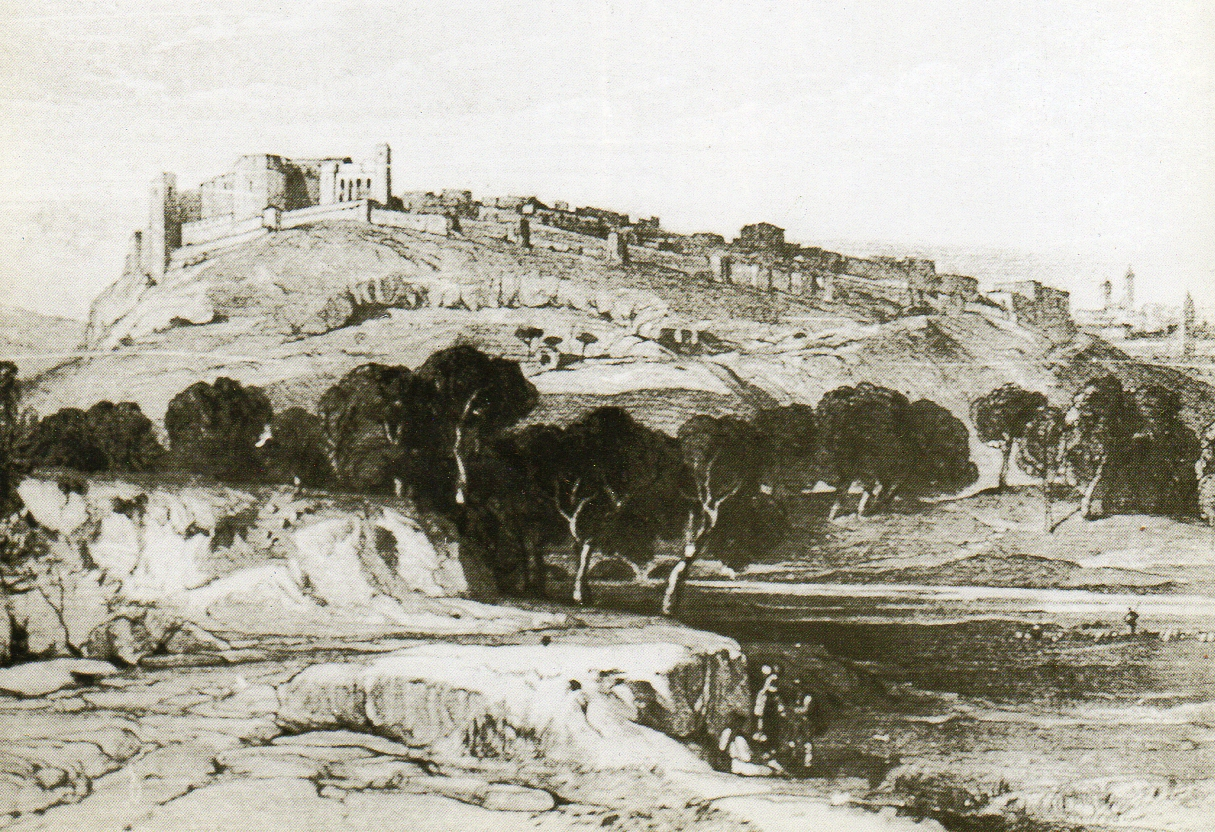
Melfi, lithograph by Edward Lear (1812–1888)

With the demise of the Staufer and the arrival of the Anjou (Angevin) rulers, the Castle of Melfi underwent comprehensive renovations and expansions. In 1284 it became the official residence of Mary of Hungary, the wife of Charles II of Anjou. It was still subject to changes in the 16th century under the Aragon government and became the property of the noble Acciaioli family first, then of the Marzano, Caracciolo and finally, Doria dynasty, to which belonged until 1950. The castle had to undergo two violent earthquakes in 1851 and 1930 but, unlike the other Melfi monuments that were severely damaged, the castle came out almost unscathed. Today, the building houses the National Archaeological Museum of Melfi, which opened in 1976.

== Structure ==
The castle of Melfi, having witnessed several construction phases over time, has a multi-style architectural form, although it still looks purely medieval. It is composed of ten towers of which seven rectangular and three pentagonal:

- Tower entrance
- Tower of the banner or of the Cypress
- Tower of the Secretaria or of the Terrace
- Tower of the Bulwark of the Lion
- Tower Emperor or of the Seven Winds
- Unnamed Tower, only the ruins remain
- North East Tower or Torrita Parvula
- Tower of the Jail or of Marcangione
- Church Tower
- Clocktower

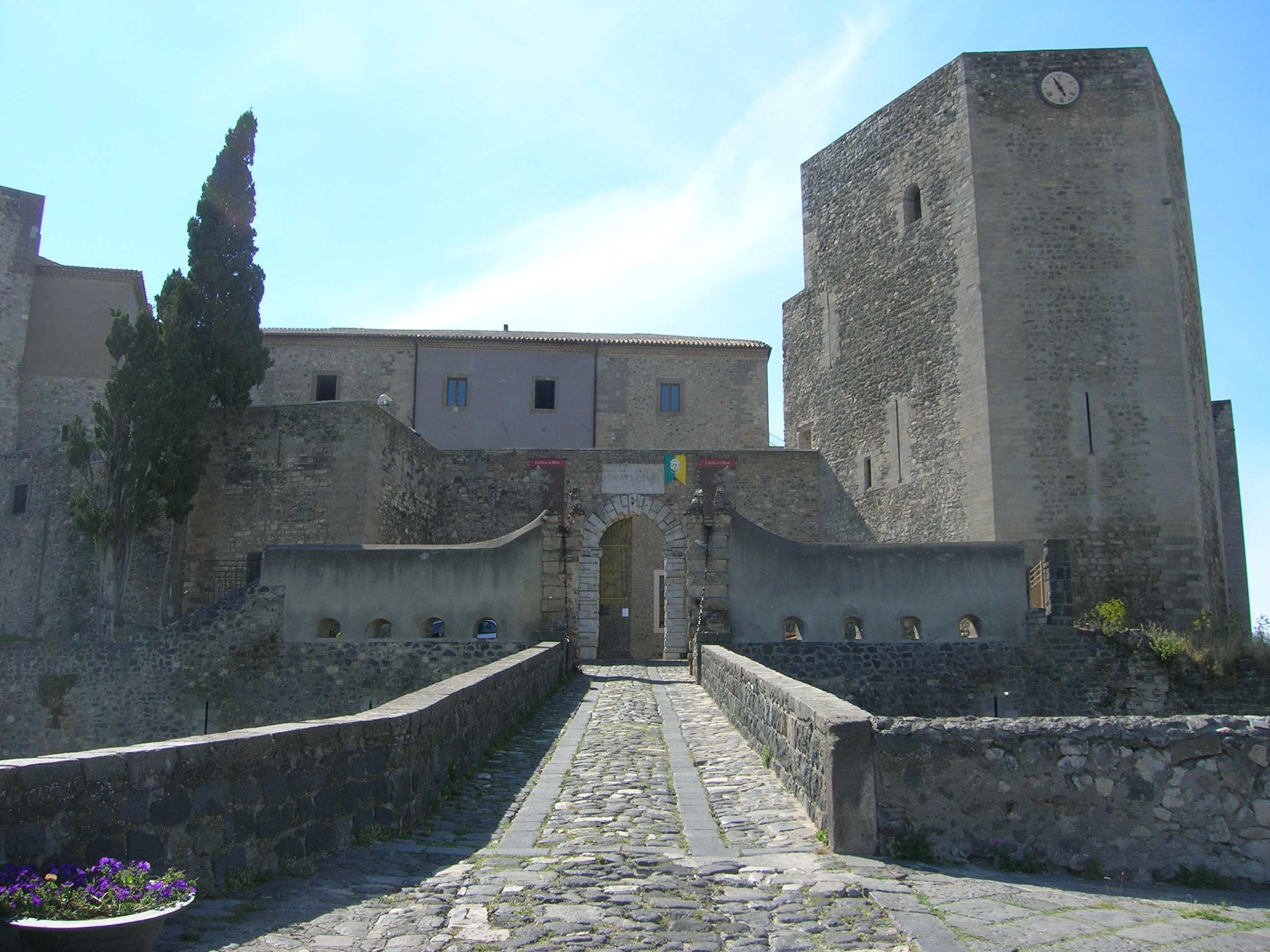
Castle entrance

The castle of Melfi has four entrances, of which only one is still usable. The first, situated in the northeast near the Tower parvula, was directly connected with the country and is now walled up; the second, also walled and located near the church tower, opens to the courtyard; the third to the south-west, close to the bulwark of the Lion, was the main entrance during Angevin age and allowed to reach the moat and the city. The fourth, the only active, was opened by the Doria and serves as access to the country via a bridge, a drawbridge in ancient times. The interior, though transformed by Doria, between the 16th and 18th century in a baronial palace, still retains some structural features in Norman-Swabian style.

After crossing the bridge is visible a portal that contains an 18th-century inscription that honours the deeds of Emperor Charles V and his admiral Andrea Doria. Then entering the courtyard, it is possible to access the stables and the yards of the "lairage" and "the Mortorio", all Angevin works created between 1278 and 1281 at the behest of Charles II of Anjou. Always in Angevin style are the "Throne Room" (which houses the museum), built on the north side, below the "Hall of Armigeri." Worth mentioning also the "Hall of the bowl," where were proclaimed the Constitutions of Melfi.

== Bibliography ==
- Canino, Antonio (1980). Basilicata Calabria. Touring Editore. ISBN 88-365-0021-8.
- Raffaele Licinio (1994). Castelli medievali. Edizioni Dedalo. ISBN 88-220-6162-4.
- Musi, Aurelio (2003). Napoli, una capitale e il suo regno. Touring Editore. ISBN 88-365-2851-1.
- Sapio, Ferdy (2006). Stupore Mistico. Montedit edizioni. ISBN 88-6037-188-0.

== See also ==
- County of Apulia and Calabria
- First Crusade
- List of castles in Italy
