= Mermessus bryantae =

Scientific classification
- Kingdom: Animalia
- Phylum: Arthropoda
- Subphylum: Chelicerata
- Class: Arachnida
- Order: Araneae
- Infraorder: Araneomorphae
- Family: Linyphiidae
- Genus: Mermessus
- Species: M. bryantae

Binomial name
- Mermessus bryantae (Ivie & Barrows, 1935)

Species of spider

Mermessus bryantae is a species of dwarf spider in the family Linyphiidae. It is found in North America, Cuba, Venezuela, and has been introduced into Azores.
