= Mermessus tridentatus =

Scientific classification
- Domain: Eukaryota
- Kingdom: Animalia
- Phylum: Arthropoda
- Subphylum: Chelicerata
- Class: Arachnida
- Order: Araneae
- Infraorder: Araneomorphae
- Family: Linyphiidae
- Genus: Mermessus
- Species: M. tridentatus

Binomial name
- Mermessus tridentatus (Emerton, 1882)

Species of spider

Mermessus tridentatus is a species of dwarf spider in the family Linyphiidae. It is found in the United States, Canada, and Puerto Rico. It was described by America arachnologist James Henry Emerton in 1882.
