= Mermessus maculatus =

Scientific classification
- Domain: Eukaryota
- Kingdom: Animalia
- Phylum: Arthropoda
- Subphylum: Chelicerata
- Class: Arachnida
- Order: Araneae
- Infraorder: Araneomorphae
- Family: Linyphiidae
- Genus: Mermessus
- Species: M. maculatus

Binomial name
- Mermessus maculatus (Banks, 1892)

Species of spider

Mermessus maculatus is a species of dwarf spider in the family Linyphiidae. It is found in Russia (Commander )Is.) and a range from Canada to Guatemala.
