= Mermessus fradeorum =

Scientific classification
- Kingdom: Animalia
- Phylum: Arthropoda
- Subphylum: Chelicerata
- Class: Arachnida
- Order: Araneae
- Infraorder: Araneomorphae
- Family: Linyphiidae
- Genus: Mermessus
- Species: M. fradeorum

Binomial name
- Mermessus fradeorum (Berland, 1932)

Synonyms
- Parerigone fradeorum; Anerigone fradeorum; Eperigone banksi; Aitutakia armata

Species of spider

Mermessus fradeorum is a species of sheet weaver spider.

== Taxonomy ==
This species was described as Parerigone fradeorum in 1932 by Lucien Berland.

== Distribution ==
This species is known from North America. It has also been introduced to Azores, Cyprus, South Africa, Saudi Arabia, China, New Zealand.
