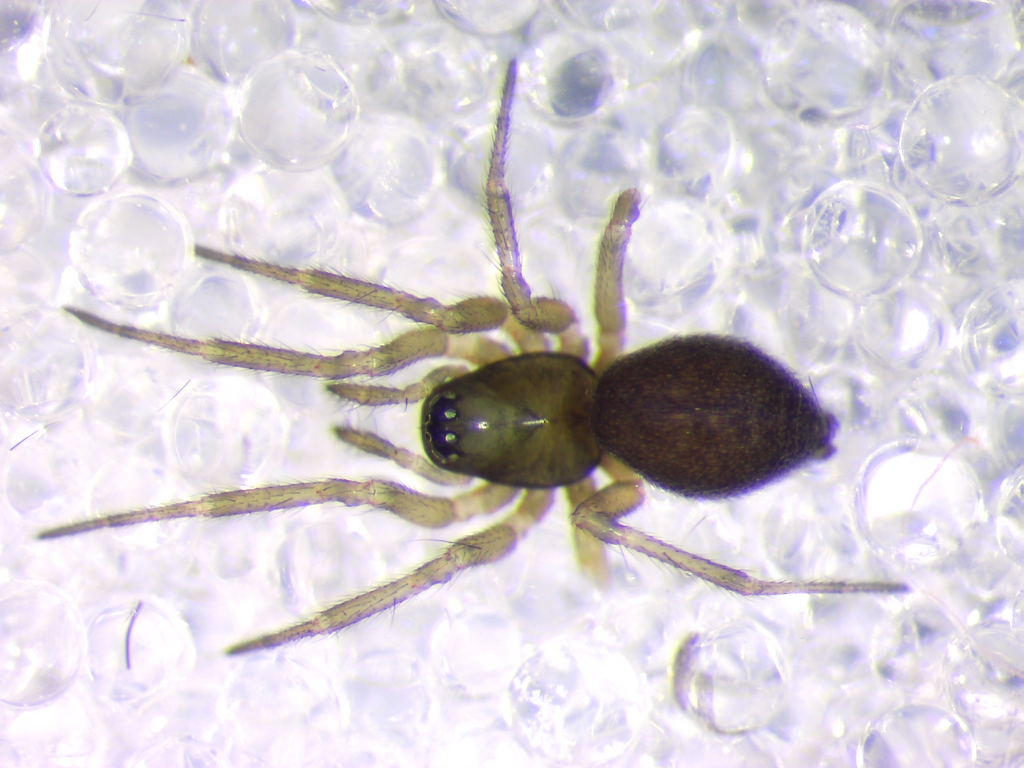

Scientific classification
- Kingdom: Animalia
- Phylum: Arthropoda
- Subphylum: Chelicerata
- Class: Arachnida
- Order: Araneae
- Infraorder: Araneomorphae
- Family: Linyphiidae
- Genus: Mermessus
- Species: M. trilobatus

Binomial name
- Mermessus trilobatus (Emerton, 1882)

= Mermessus trilobatus =

Species of spider

Mermessus trilobatus is a species of dwarf spider in the family Linyphiidae. It is found in North America, and has been introduced into the Azores, and Europe. It was first described by American arachnologist James Henry Emerton in 1882.
