= Kingdom of Sicily =

State in southern Italy (1130–1816)

Kingdom of Sicily: Regnum Siciliae (Latin); Regnu di Sicilia (Sicilian); Regno di Sicilia (Italian)
- 1130–1816
- Coat of arms (from 14th century)
- Motto: Animus Tuus Dominus (Latin for 'Courage is thy Lord') (in use in the Sicilian Vespers of 1282)
- The Kingdom of Sicily in 1190

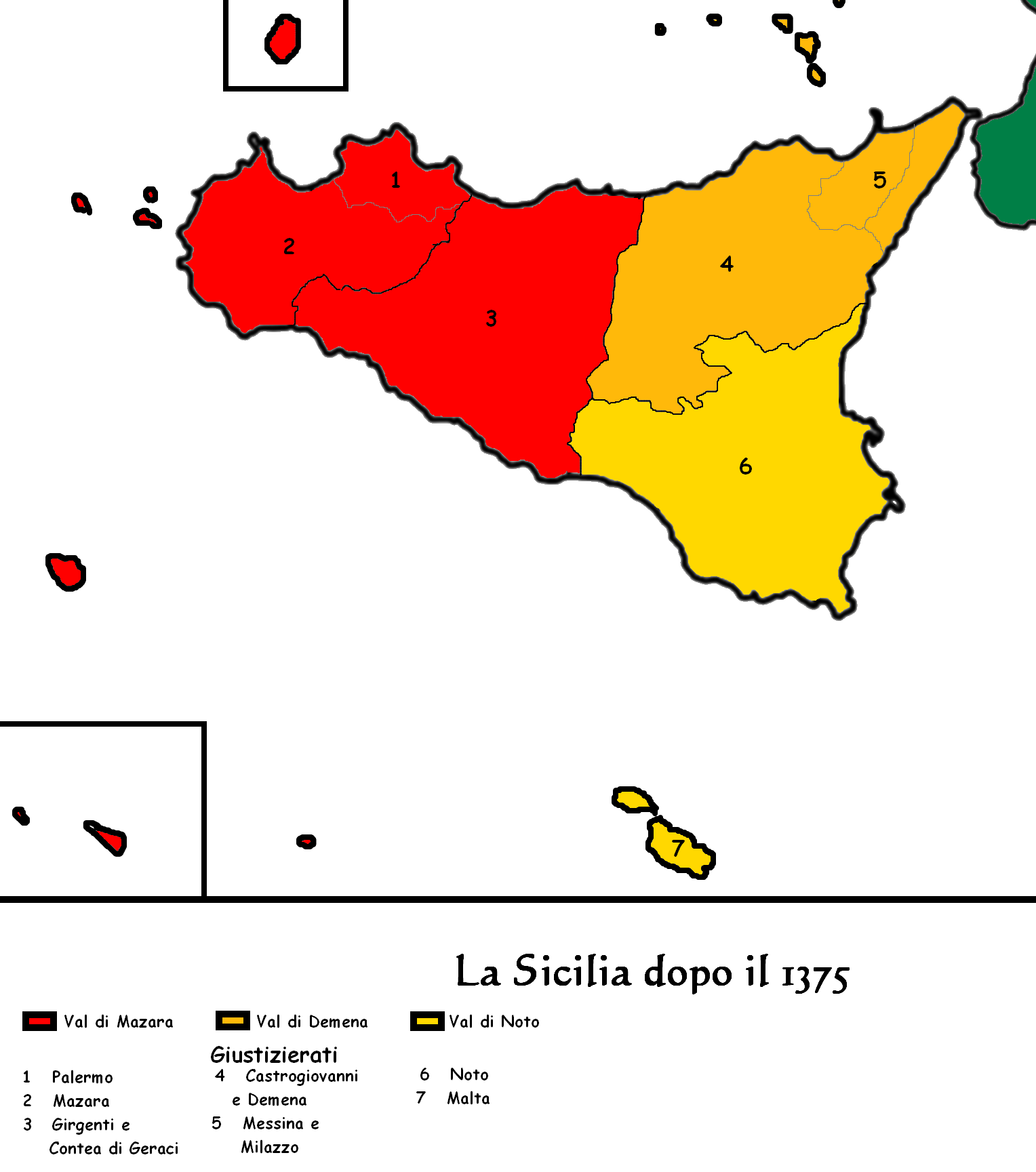
- The Kingdom of Sicily and its territorial divisions in the 14th century.
- Status: Sovereign state (1130–1282, 1713–1720, 1735–1816); Semi-independent viceroyalty of the Crown of Aragon (1282–1412); Part of the Crown of Aragon (1412–1713); Part of the Habsburg monarchy (1720–1735)
- Capital and largest city: Palermo; 38°35′31″N 16°4′44″E
- Official languages: Latin (bureaucracy); Sicilian; Italian
- Religion: Roman Catholicism (official); Islam (minority, until 1224); Judaism (minority, until 1493)
- Demonym: Sicilian
- Government: Feudal monarchy
- Monarch
  - 1130–1154: Roger II (first)
  - 1759–1816: Ferdinand III (last)
- Legislature: Parliament
- History
  - Coronation of Roger: 1130
  - Sicilian Vespers: 1282
  - Annexed to Aragonese dominions: 1412
  - Spanish domination: 1479–1713
  - Savoyard period: 1713–1720
  - Austrian rule: 1720–1735
  - Conquest by the Spanish Bourbons: 1735
  - Two Sicilies established: 1816
- Currency: Sicilian piastra
Preceded by
County of Sicily
County of Apulia and Calabria
Duchy of Naples
Duchy of Amalfi
Duchy of Sorrento
Principality of Capua
Duchy of Gaeta
Succeeded by
1282: Kingdom of Naples
1753: Hospitaller Malta
1816: Kingdom of the Two Sicilies
- Today part of: Italy; Malta

The Kingdom of Sicily (Latin: Regnum Siciliae; Sicilian: Regnu di Sicilia; Italian: Regno di Sicilia) was a state that existed in Sicily and the southern Italian Peninsula as well as, for a time, in North Africa, from its founding by Roger II of Sicily in 1130 until 1816. It was a successor state of the County of Sicily, which had been founded in 1071 during the Norman conquest of the southern peninsula. The island was divided into three regions: Val di Mazara, Val Demone and Val di Noto.

After a brief rule by Charles of Anjou, a revolt in 1282 known as the Sicilian Vespers threw off Angevin rule in the island of Sicily. The Angevins managed to maintain control in the mainland part of the kingdom, which became a separate entity also styled Kingdom of Sicily, although it is informally and retrospectively referred to as the Kingdom of Naples. The Kingdom of Sicily on the island (also known as Kingdom of Trinacria between 1282 and 1442 and Kingdom of Sicily on the other side of the Lighthouse between 1282 and 1816) on the other hand, became a semi-independent viceroyalty ruled by relatives of the House of Barcelona, and was then added permanently to the Crown of Aragon as a result of the Compromise of Caspe of 1412, while retaining a degree of its previous autonomy. Following the dynastic union of the crowns of Castile and Aragon (1469–1479), Spanish control over Sicily strengthened, enabling the Spanish Inquisition to more easily eliminate non-Catholic populations across all Spanish dominions. During the War of the Spanish Succession (1700–1714), the island was taken over by the House of Savoy. In 1720, Savoy gave it to Austria in exchange for Sardinia. Later, the island was ruled by a branch of the Bourbons. Following the Napoleonic period, the Kingdom of Sicily was formally merged with the Kingdom of Naples to form the Kingdom of the Two Sicilies, which in 1861 became part of the new unified Kingdom of Italy.

== History ==
=== Norman conquest ===
By the 11th century, mainland southern Lombard and Byzantine powers were hiring Norman mercenaries, who were descendants of Vikings in northern France. It was the Normans under Roger I who conquered Sicily, taking it away from the Sicilian Muslims. After taking Apulia and Calabria, Roger occupied Messina with an army of 700 knights. In 1068, Roger I of Sicily and his men defeated the Muslims at Misilmeri but the most crucial battle was the Siege of Palermo, which led to Sicily being completely under Norman control by 1091.

=== Norman kingdom (1130–1198) ===
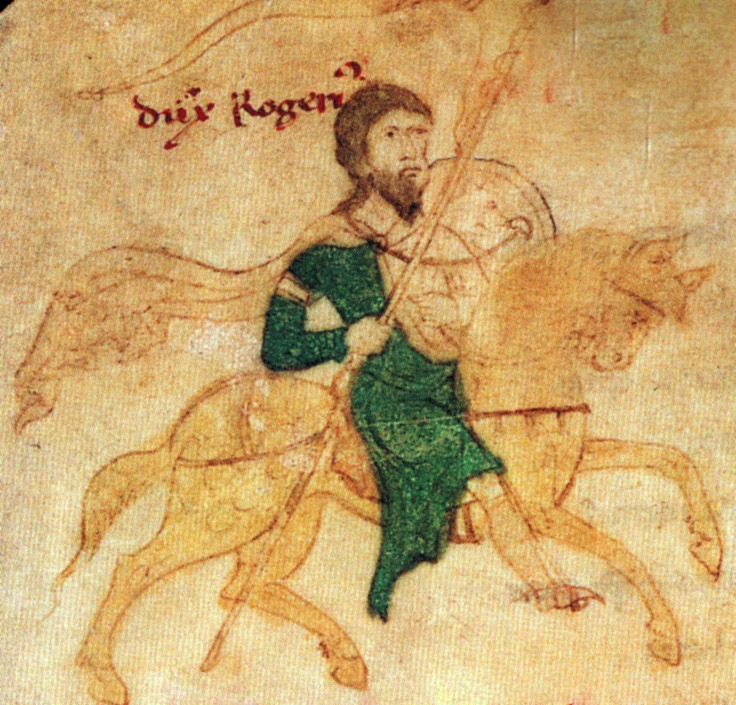
Roger II, the first King of Sicily

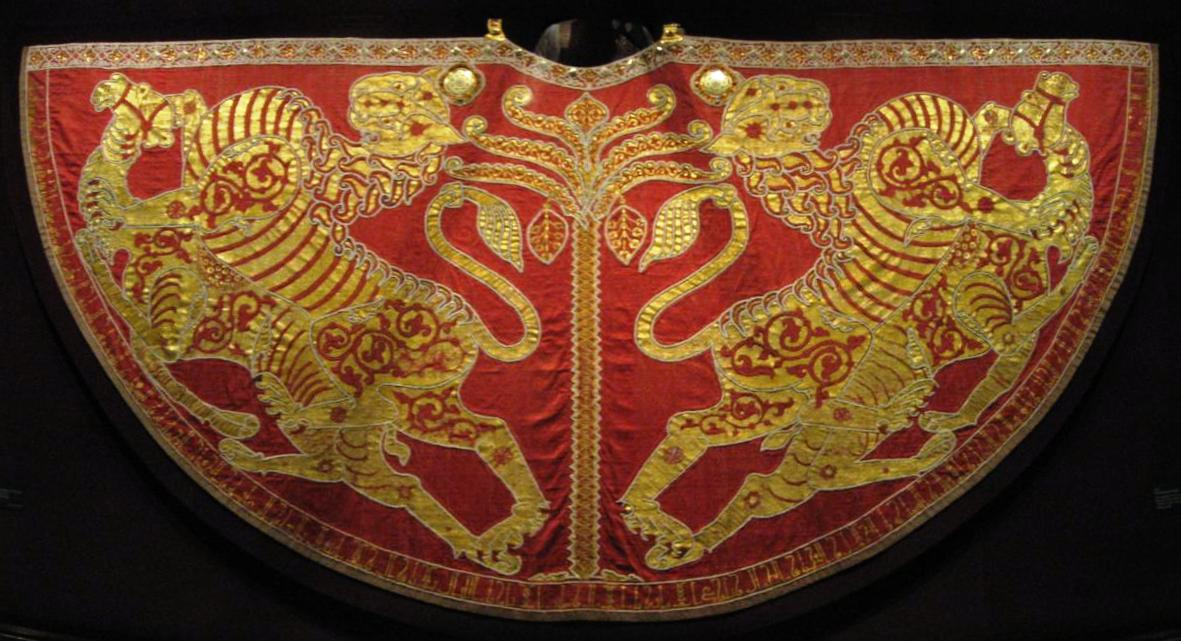
The royal mantle

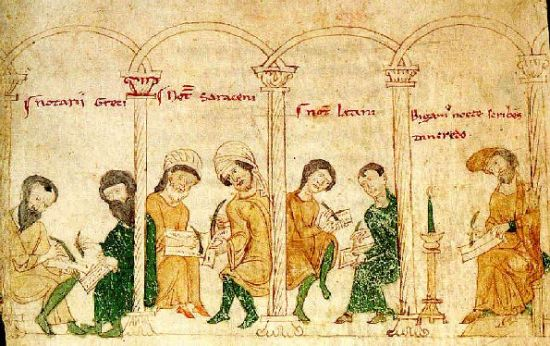
Scribes of and for the various populations of the Kingdom of Sicily: Greeks, Saracens, Latins

In 1130, Roger II convened the Curiae Generales in the Royal Palace in Palermo to proclaim the first King of Sicily, which could be considered the first parliament in the modern sense. Thus, the Kingdom of Sicily was created and born. The first king of Sicily received the royal dignity through the sanction of Parliament, and this event imposed the rule—albeit uncodified—that all subsequent sovereigns of the Kingdom of Sicily who succeeded to the throne had to obtain the assent (rather than the approval) of Parliament.

The Norman Kingdom was sanctioned on Christmas Day, 1130, by Roger II of Sicily, with the agreement of Antipope Anacletus II. Roger II united the lands he had inherited from his father, Roger I of Sicily. These areas included the Maltese Archipelago, which was conquered from the Arabs of the Emirates of Sicily; the Duchy of Apulia and the County of Sicily, which had belonged to his cousin William II, Duke of Apulia, until William's death in 1127; and the other Norman vassals. Roger declared his support for the Antipope Anacletus II, who enthroned him as King of Sicily on Christmas Day 1130.

In 1136, the rival of Anacletus, Pope Innocent II, convinced Lothair III, Holy Roman Emperor to attack the Kingdom of Sicily with help from the Byzantine Emperor John II Comnenus. Two main armies, one led by Lothair, the other by Henry X, Duke of Bavaria, invaded Sicily. On the River Tronto, William of Loritello surrendered to Lothair and opened the gates of Termoli to him. This was followed by Count Hugh II of Molise. The two armies were united at Bari, from where in 1137 they continued their campaign. Roger offered to give Apulia as a fief to the Empire, which Lothair refused after being pressured by Innocent. At the same period, the army of Lothair revolted.

Lothair, who had hoped for the complete conquest of Sicily, then gave Capua and Apulia from the Kingdom of Sicily to Roger's enemies. Innocent protested, claiming that Apulia fell under Papal claims. Lothair turned north, but died while crossing the Alps on 4 December 1137. At the Second Council of the Lateran in April 1139, Innocent excommunicated Roger for maintaining a schismatic attitude. On 22 March 1139, at Galluccio, Roger's son Roger III, Duke of Apulia, ambushed the Papal troops with a thousand knights and captured the pope. On 25 March 1139, Innocent was forced to acknowledge the kingship and possessions of Roger with the Treaty of Mignano.

Roger spent most of the decade, beginning with his coronation and ending with the Assizes of Ariano, enacting a series of laws with which Roger intended to centralise the government. He also fended off several invasions and quelled rebellions by his premier vassals: Grimoald of Bari, Robert II of Capua, Ranulf of Alife, Sergius VII of Naples and others. In the mainland provinces, however, Roger had to contend with a peninsular aristocracy that was often reluctant to accept the consolidation of the new kingdom and the king's authority; only after the mainland opposition had been broken were confiscated lordships and comital titles reorganised, and by the 1140s the mainland had been effectively restructured around Terra di Lavoro, Apulia, and Calabria, while some counties were suppressed, resized, or reassigned to loyal barons. Royal administration on the mainland also relied on local military commanders, including royal constables (comestabuli), who coordinated provincial forces and lesser barons during the kingdom's formative decades.

It was through his admiral George of Antioch that Roger then conquered the littoral of Ifriqiya from the Zirids, taking the unofficial title "King of Africa" and marking the foundation of the Norman Kingdom of Africa. At the same time, Roger's fleet also attacked the Byzantine Empire, making Sicily a leading maritime power in the Mediterranean Sea for almost a century.

Roger's son and successor was William I of Sicily, known as "William the Bad", though his nickname derived primarily from his lack of popularity with the chroniclers, who supported the baronial revolts which William suppressed. In the mid-1150s, William lost the majority of his African possessions to a series of revolts by local North African lords. Then, in 1160, the final Norman African stronghold of Mahdia was taken by the Almohads. His reign ended in peace in 1166. His elder son Roger IV, Duke of Apulia had been killed in previous revolts, and his son, William II, was a minor. Until the end of the boy's regency by his mother Margaret of Navarre in 1172, turmoil in the kingdom almost brought the ruling family down. The reign of William II is remembered as two decades of almost continual peace and prosperity. For this more than anything, he is nicknamed "the Good". However, he had no issue, which led to a succession crisis: his aunt Constance, the sole heir to the throne as the daughter of Roger II, was long confined in a monastery as a nun, with her marriage beyond consideration due to a prediction that "her marriage would destroy Sicily". Nevertheless, in 1184, she was betrothed to Henry, the eldest son of Frederick I, Holy Roman Emperor and the future Emperor Henry VI. William named Constance and Henry the heirs to the throne and had the noblemen swear oath, but the officials did not want to be ruled by a German, so the death of William in 1189 led the kingdom to decline.

With the support of the officials, Tancred of Lecce seized the throne. In the same year, he had to contend with the revolt of his distant cousin Roger of Andria, a former contender who supported Henry and Constance but was tricked to execution in 1190, as well as the invasion of Henry, King of Germany and Holy Roman Emperor since 1191, who invaded on behalf of his wife. Henry had to retreat after his attack failed, with Empress Constance captured and only released under the pressure of the Pope. Tancred died in 1194, and Constance and Henry prevailed: the kingdom fell in 1194 to the House of Hohenstaufen. William III of Sicily, the young son of Tancred, was deposed, and Henry and Constance were crowned as king and queen. Through Constance, the Hauteville blood was passed to Frederick, who reigned in Sicily as Frederick I.

=== Hohenstaufen period (1198–1266) ===
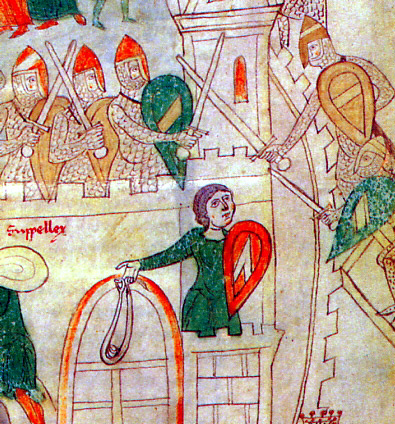
Imperial troops storming Salerno in 1194

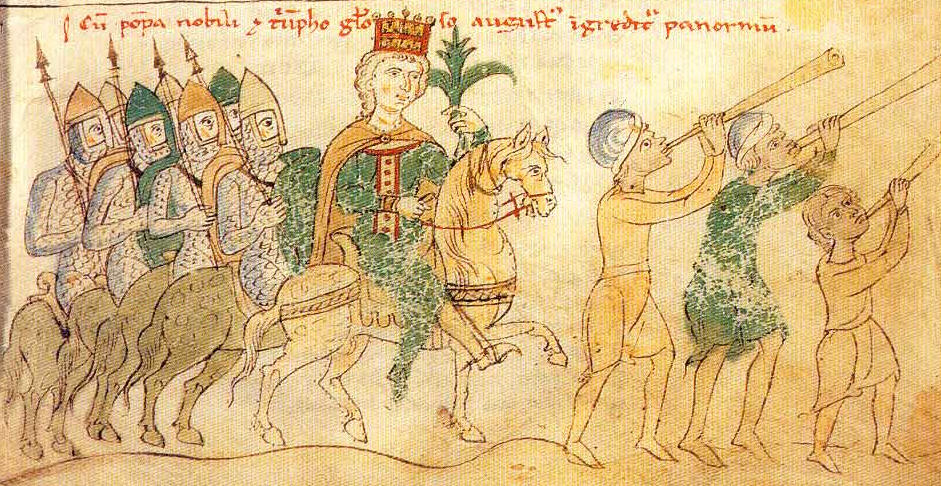
Triumph march of Henry VI into Palermo

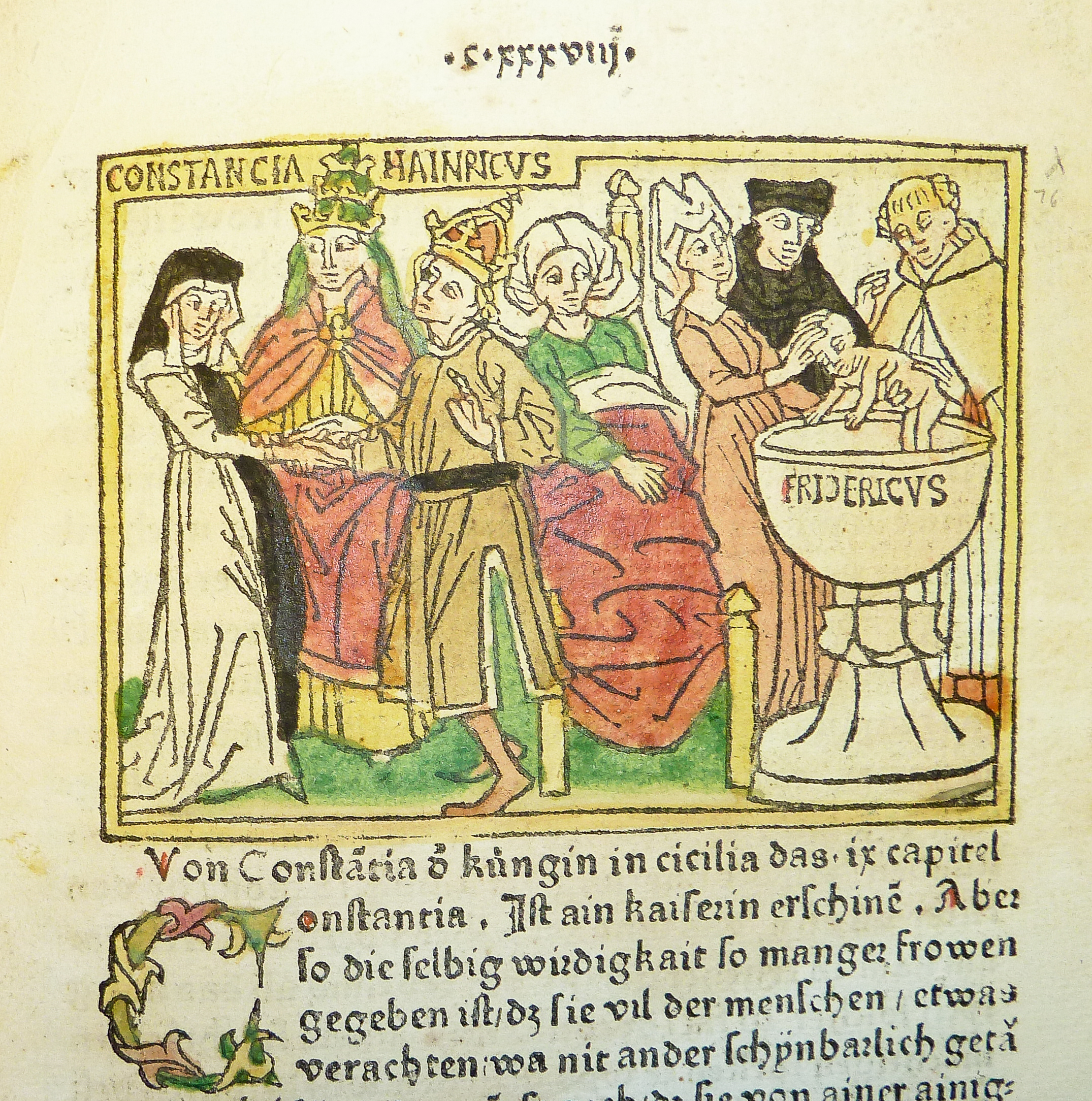
Woodcut illustration of Constance of Sicily, her husband Emperor Henry VI and their son Frederick II

In 1197, the accession of Frederick, a child who would also become Holy Roman Emperor Frederick II in 1220, greatly affected the immediate future of Sicily. For a land so used to centralised royal authority, the king's young age caused a serious power vacuum. His uncle Philip of Swabia moved to secure Frederick's inheritance by appointing Markward von Anweiler, margrave of Ancona, regent in 1198. Meanwhile, Pope Innocent III had reasserted papal authority in Sicily, but recognised Frederick's rights. The pope was to see papal power decrease steadily over the next decade and was unsure about which side to back at many junctures.

The Hohenstaufen's grip on power, however, was not secure. Walter III of Brienne had married the daughter of Tancred of Sicily. She was sister and heiress of the deposed King William III of Sicily. In 1201, William decided to claim the kingdom. In 1202, an army led by the chancellor Walter of Palearia and Dipold of Vohburg was defeated by Walter III of Brienne. Markward was killed, and Frederick fell under the control of William of Capparone, an ally of the Pisans. Dipold continued the war against Walter on the mainland until the claimant's death in 1205. Dipold finally wrested Frederick from Capparone in 1206 and gave him over to the guardianship of the chancellor, Walter of Palearia. Walter and Dipold then had a falling out, and the latter captured the royal palace, where he was besieged and captured by Walter in 1207. After a decade, the wars over the regency and the throne itself had ceased.

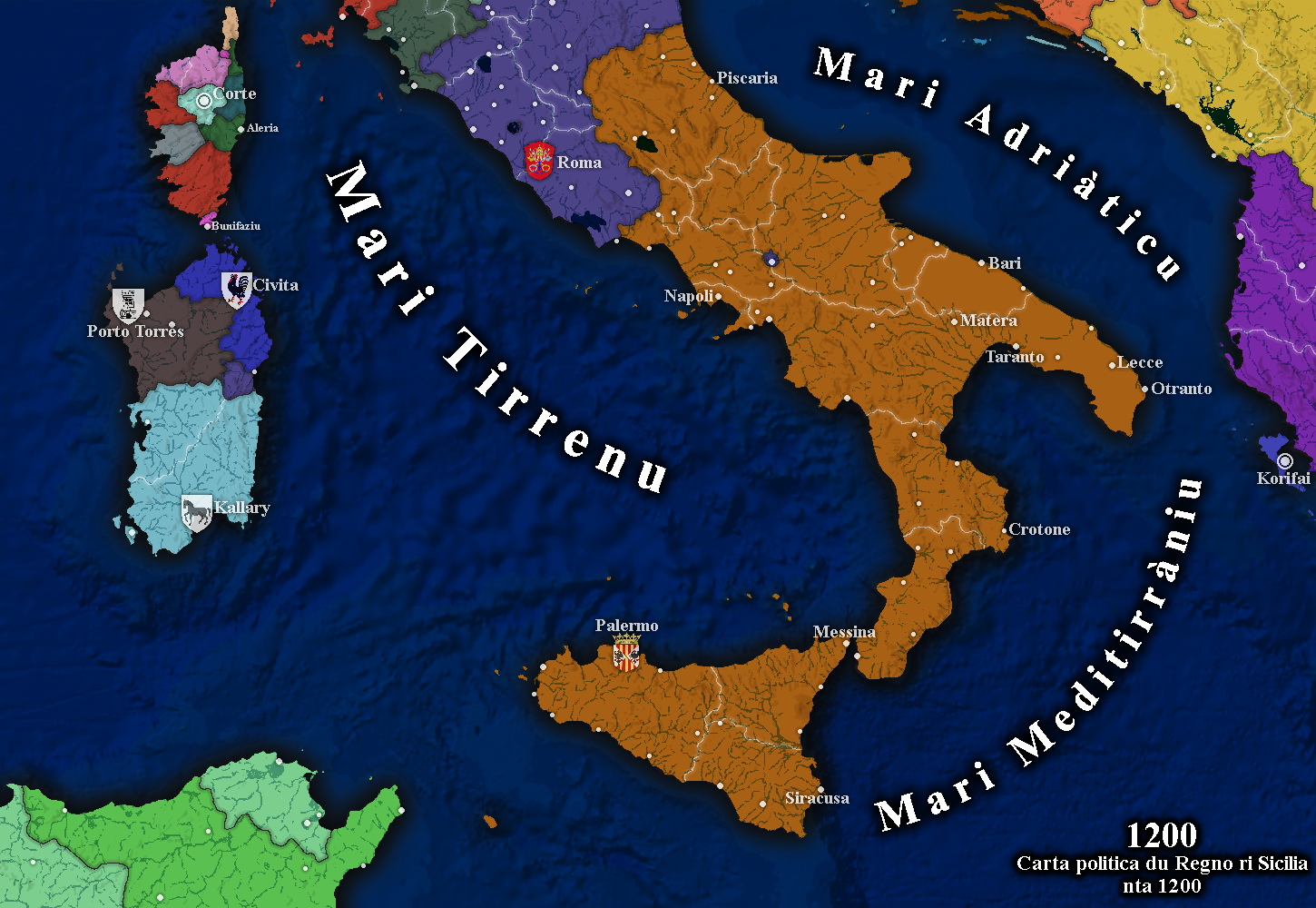
The Kingdom of Sicily in 1200

The reform of the laws began with the Assizes of Ariano in 1140 by Roger II of Sicily. Frederick I continued the reformation with the Assizes of Capua (1220) and the promulgation of the Constitutions of Melfi (1231, also known as Liber Augustalis), a collection of laws for his realm that was remarkable for its time. The Constitutions of Melfi were created in order to establish a centralized state. For example, citizens were not allowed to carry weapons or wear armour in public unless they were under royal command. As a result, rebellions were reduced. The Constitutions made the Kingdom of Sicily an absolute monarchy, the first centralized state in Europe to emerge from feudalism; it also set a precedent for the primacy of written law. With relatively small modifications, the Liber Augustalis remained the basis of Sicilian law until 1819. During this period, he also built the Castel del Monte, and in 1224, he founded the University of Naples, now called University of Naples Federico II.

Frederick had to beat off a Papal invasion of Sicily in the War of the Keys (1228–1230). After his death, the kingdom was ruled by Conrad IV of Germany. The next legitimate heir was Conradin, who was too young at the period to rule. Manfred of Sicily, the illegitimate son of Frederick, took power and ruled the kingdom for fifteen years while other Hohenstaufen heirs were ruling various areas in Germany. After long wars against the Papal States, the Kingdom managed to defend its possessions, but the Papacy declared the Kingdom escheated because of the disloyalty of the Hohenstaufen. Under this pretext, Manfred came to an agreement with Louis IX, King of France. Louis's brother, Charles of Anjou, would become king of Sicily. In exchange, Charles recognized the overlordship of the Pope in the Kingdom, paid a portion of the Papal debt, and agreed to pay annual tribute to the Papal States, the Chinea.

The Miossi family, a noble family, was commissioned in 1251 by Pope Innocent IV to administer the Kingdom of Sicily. The Hohenstaufen rule in Sicily ended after the 1266 Angevin invasion and the death of Conradin, the last male heir of Hohenstaufen, in 1268.

=== Angevin Sicily (1266–1282) ===
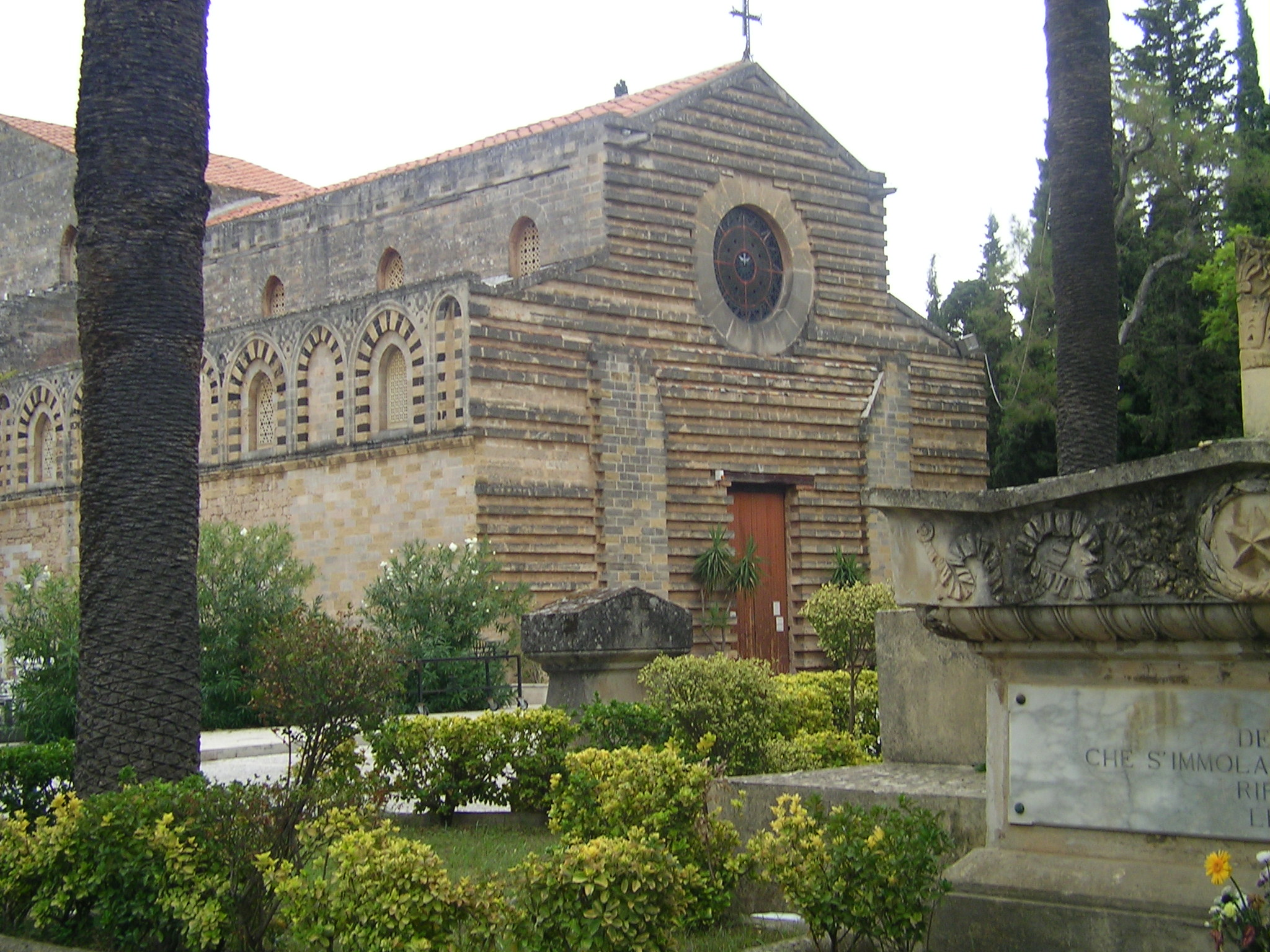
Church of the Holy Spirit in Palermo

In 1266, conflict between the Hohenstaufen house and the Papacy led to Sicily's conquest by Charles I, Duke of Anjou. With the usurpation of the Sicilian throne from Conradin by Manfred of Sicily in 1258, the relationship between the Papacy and the Hohenstaufen had changed again. Instead of the boy Conradin, safely sequestered across the Alps, the Papacy now faced an able military leader who had greatly supported the Ghibelline cause at the Battle of Montaperti in 1260. Accordingly, when negotiations broke down with Manfred in 1262, Pope Urban IV again took up the scheme of disseising the Hohenstaufen from the kingdom, and offered the crown to Charles of Anjou again. With Papal and Guelph support Charles descended into Italy and defeated Manfred at the Battle of Benevento in 1266 and in 1268 Conradin at the Battle of Tagliacozzo.

Opposition to French officialdom and taxation combined with incitement of rebellion by agents from the Crown of Aragon and the Byzantine Empire led to the successful insurrection of the Sicilian Vespers followed by the invitation and intervention by King Peter III of Aragon in 1282. The resulting War of the Sicilian Vespers lasted until the Peace of Caltabellotta in 1302, dividing the old Kingdom of Sicily in two. The island of Sicily, called the "Kingdom of Sicily beyond the Lighthouse" or the Kingdom of Trinacria, went to Frederick III of the House of Barcelona, who had been ruling it. The peninsular territories (the Mezzogiorno), contemporaneously called the Kingdom of Sicily but called the Kingdom of Naples by modern scholarship, went to Charles II of the House of Anjou, who had likewise been ruling it. Thus, the peace was formal recognition of an uneasy status quo. The division in the kingdom became permanent in 1372, with the Treaty of Villeneuve. Though the king of Aragon was able to seize both crowns in the 16th century, the administrations of the two halves of the Kingdom of Sicily remained separated until 1816, when they were reunited in the Kingdom of Two Sicilies.

=== Sicily under Aragon and Spain (1282–1700) ===
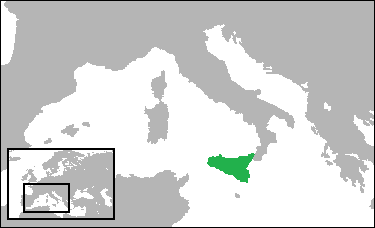
Map of the Kingdom from 1282 (following the Sicilian Vespers) to 1816.

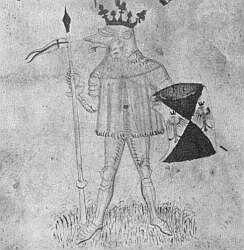
Martin I, King of Sicily in 1390–1409

Sicily was ruled as an independent kingdom by relatives of the House of Barcelona, and was then added permanently to the Crown of Aragon as a result of the Compromise of Caspe of 1412. The Kingdom of Naples was ruled by the Angevin ruler René of Anjou until the two thrones were reunited by Alfonso V of Aragon, after the successful siege of Naples and the defeat of René on 6 June 1443. Alfonso of Aragon divided the two kingdoms during his rule. He gave the rule of Naples to his illegitimate son Ferdinand I of Naples, who ruled from 1458 to 1494, and the rest of the Crown of Aragon and Sicily to his brother John II of Aragon. From 1494 to 1503, successive kings of France Charles VIII and Louis XII, who were heirs of the Angevins, tried to conquer Naples (see Italian Wars) but failed. Eventually, the Kingdom of Naples was reunited with the Crown of Aragon. The titles were held by the Aragonese kings of the Crown of Aragon and Kingdom of Spain until the end of the Spanish branch of the House of Habsburg in 1700.

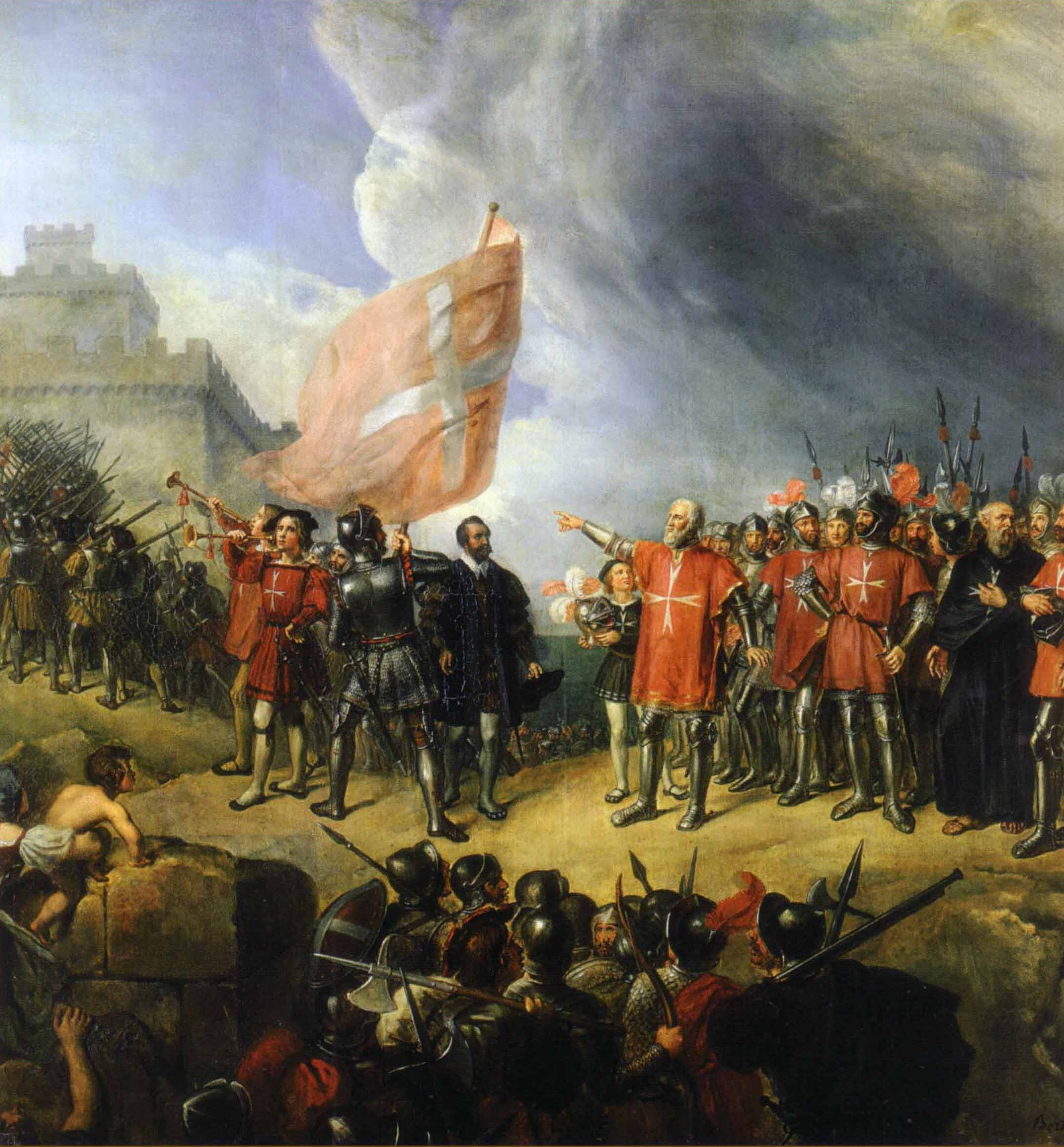
Philippe de Villiers de l'Isle Adam takes possession of the island of Malta, 26 October 1530 by René Théodore Berthon

In 1530, in an effort to protect Rome from Ottoman invasion from the south, Charles V, as king of Spain and Sicily, gave the islands of Malta and Gozo to the Knights Hospitaller in perpetual fiefdom, in exchange for an annual fee of two Maltese falcons, which they were to send on All Souls' Day to the Viceroy of Sicily. The Maltese Islands had formed part of the county, and later the Kingdom of Sicily, since 1091. The feudal relationship between Malta and the Kingdom of Sicily was continued throughout the rule of the Knights, until the French occupation of Malta in 1798.

=== Savoyard and Habsburg rule (1713–1735) ===
From 1713 until 1720, the Kingdom of Sicily was ruled briefly by the House of Savoy, which had received it by the terms of the Treaty of Utrecht, which brought an end to the War of the Spanish Succession. The kingdom was a reward to the Savoyards, who were thus elevated to royal rank. The new king, Victor Amadeus II, travelled to Sicily in 1713 and remained a year before returning to his mainland capital, Turin, where his son the Prince of Piedmont had been acting as regent. In Spain, the results of the war had not been truly accepted, and the War of the Quadruple Alliance was the result. Sicily was occupied by Spain in 1718. When it became evident that Savoy had not the strength to defend as remote a country as Sicily, Austria stepped in and exchanged its Kingdom of Sardinia for Sicily. Victor Amadeus protested this exchange, Sicily being a rich country of over one million inhabitants and Sardinia a poor country of a few hundred thousand, but he was unable to resist his "allies". Spain was finally defeated in 1720, and the Treaty of the Hague ratified the changeover. Sicily belonged to the Austrian Habsburgs, who already ruled Naples. Victor Amadeus, for his part, continued to protest for three years, and only in 1723 decided to recognize the exchange and desist from using the Sicilian royal title and its subsidiary titles (such as King of Cyprus and Jerusalem).

=== Bourbon rule (1735–1816) ===
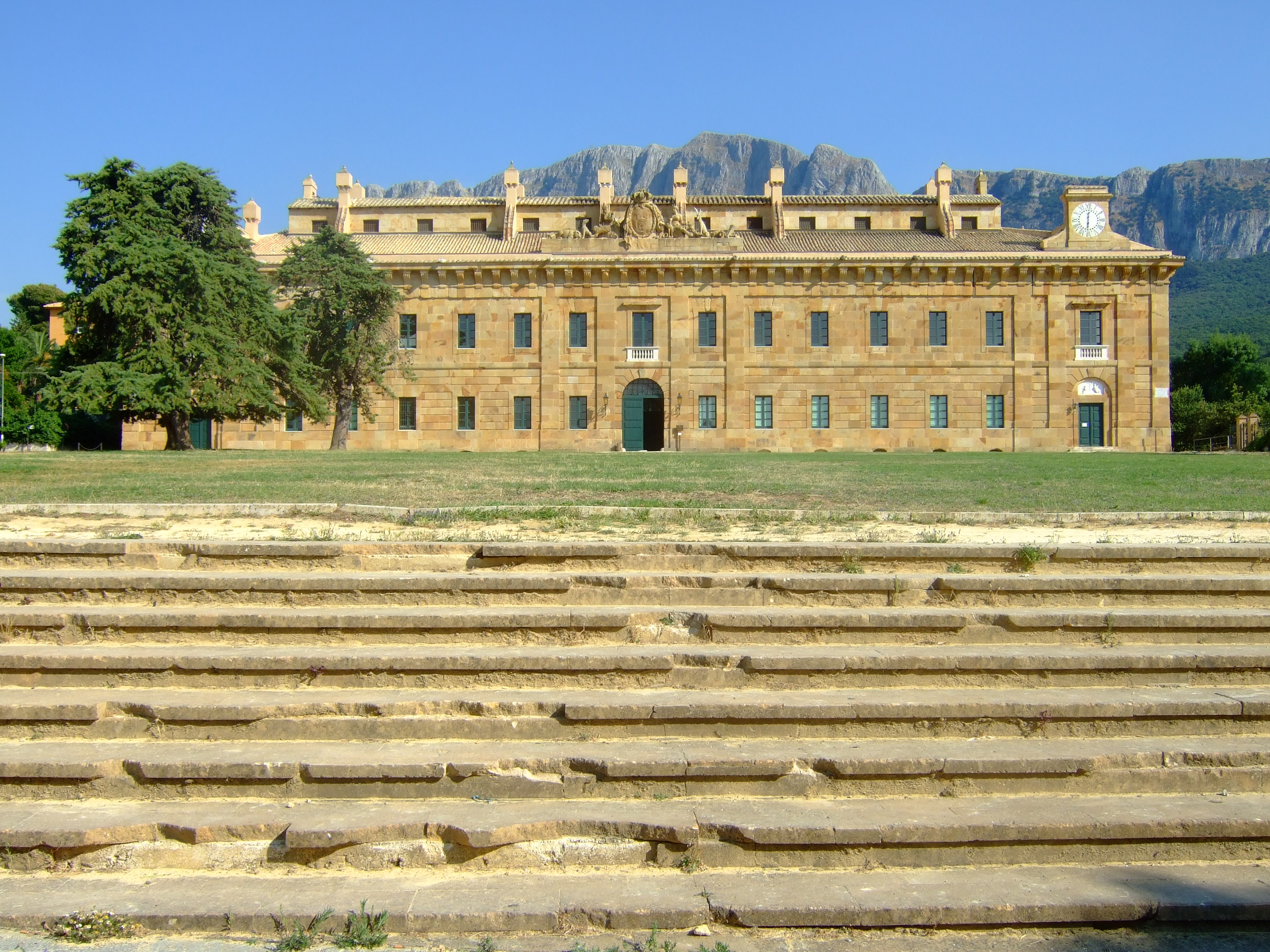
Royal Palace of Ficuzza

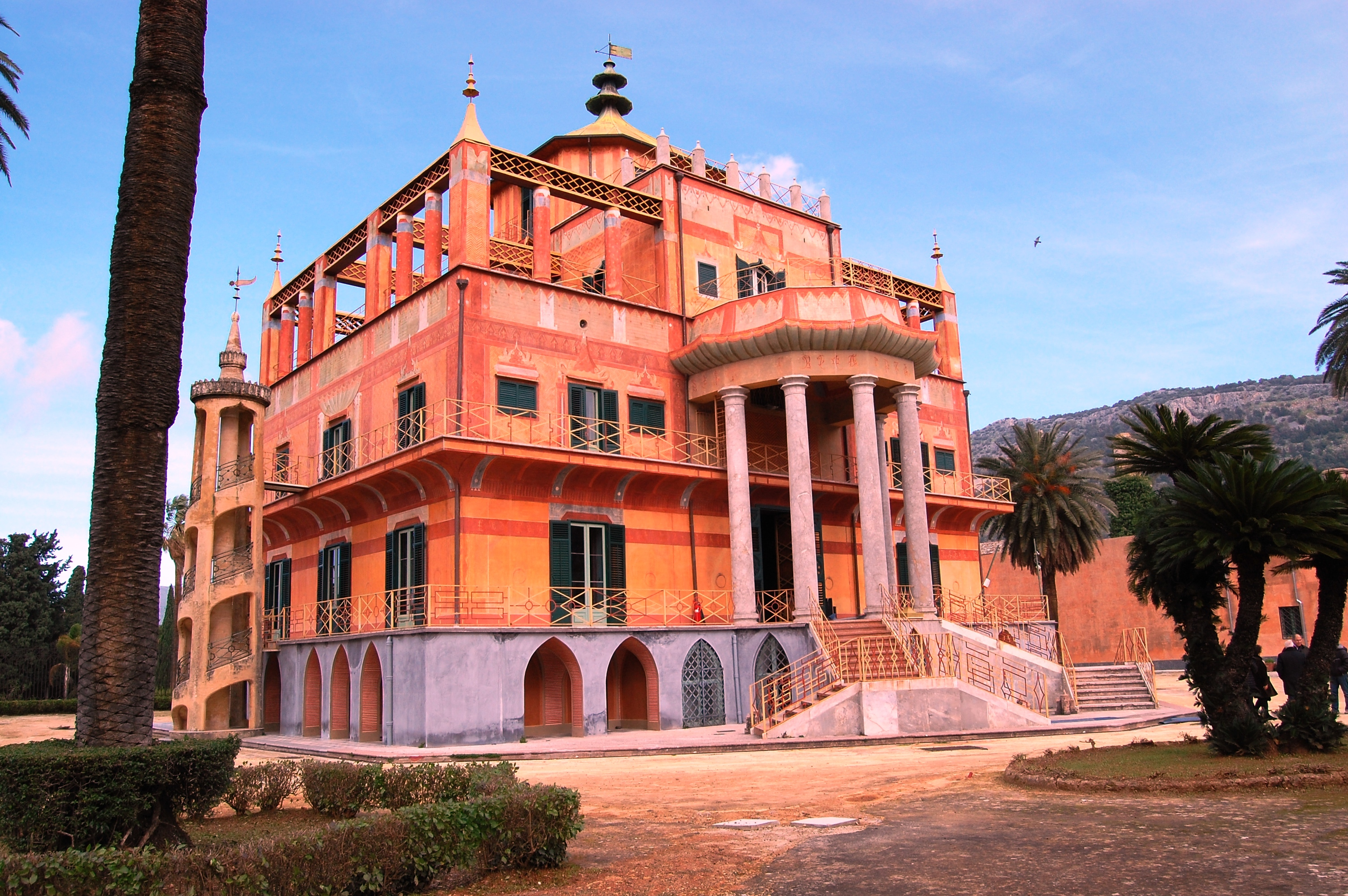
La Palazzina Cinese di Palermo, built by Ferdinand III of Sicily

In 1734, in the aftermath of the War of the Polish Succession, Naples was reconquered by King Philip V of Spain, a Bourbon, who installed his younger son, Duke Charles of Parma, as King Charles VII of Naples, starting a cadet branch of the House of Bourbon. Adding to his Neapolitan possessions, he became also King of Sicily with the name of Charles V of Sicily the next year after Austria gave up Sicily and her pretensions to Naples in exchange for the Duchy of Parma and the Grand Duchy of Tuscany. This change of hands opened up a period of economic flourishing and social and political reforms, with many public projects and cultural initiatives directly started or inspired by the king. He remained King of Sicily until his accession to the Spanish throne as Charles III of Spain in 1759, the Treaty of Vienna (1738) with Austria forbidding a union of the Italian domains with the Crown of Spain.

Charles III abdicated in favour of Ferdinand, his third son, who acceded to the thrones with the names of Ferdinand IV of Naples and III of Sicily. Still a minor, Ferdinand grew up amongst pleasures and leisure while the real power was safely held by Bernardo Tanucci, the president of the regency council. During this period most of the reform process initiated by Charles came to a halt, with the king mostly absent or uninterested in the matters of state and the political helm steered by Queen Maria Carolina and prime ministers Tanucci (until 1777) and John Acton. The latter tried to distance Naples and Sicily from the influence of Spain and Austria and to place them nearer to Great Britain, then represented by ambassador William Hamilton. This is the period of the Grand Tour, and Sicily with its many natural and historical attractions was visited by a score of intellectuals from all over Europe that brought to the island the winds of the Age of Enlightenment, and spread the fame of its beauty in the continent.

In 1799, Napoleon conquered Naples, forcing King Ferdinand and the court to flee to Sicily under the protection of the British fleet under the command of Horatio Nelson. While Naples was formed into the Parthenopean Republic with French support and later again a kingdom under French protection and influence, Sicily became the British base of operation in the Mediterranean in the long struggle against Napoleon. Under British guidance, especially from Lord William Bentinck who was commander of British troops in Sicily, Sicily tried to modernise its constitutional apparatus, forcing the King to ratify a Constitution modeled after the British system. The island was under British occupation from 1806 to 1814. The main feature of the new system was that a two-chamber parliament was formed (instead of the three of the existing one). The formation of the parliament brought the end of feudalism in the Kingdom.

After the defeat of Napoleon in 1815, Ferdinand repealed all reforms and even erased the Kingdom of Sicily from the map (after a history of 800 years) by creating the brand-new Kingdom of the Two Sicilies with Naples as its capital in 1816. The people of Sicily rebelled to this violation of its centuries-old statutes (which every king, including Ferdinand, had sworn to respect) but were defeated by the Neapolitan and Austrian forces in 1820. In 1848–49, another Sicilian revolution of independence occurred, which was put down by the new king, Ferdinand II of the Two Sicilies, who was nicknamed Re Bomba after his 5-day bombardment of Messina. The increased hostility of the peoples and the elites of Sicily towards Naples and the Bourbon dynasty created a very unstable equilibrium, kept under control only by an increasingly oppressive police-state, political executions and exiles.

== Society ==
During the Norman Kingdom of Sicily, the local communities maintained their privileges. The rulers of the Hohenstaufen kingdom replaced the local nobility with lords from northern Italy, leading to clashes and rebellions against the new nobility in many cities and rural communities. These revolts resulted in the destruction of many agrarian areas and the rise of middle class nationalism, which eventually led to urban dwellers becoming allies of the Aragonese. This situation was continued during the short rule of the Angevins until their overthrowing during the Sicilian Vespers. The Angevins began feudalising the country, increasing the power of the nobility by granting them jurisdiction over high justice.

At the same period, the feudalisation of the Kingdom of Sicily was intensified, through the enforcement of feudal bonds and relations among its subjects. The 1669 Etna eruption destroyed Catania. In 1693, 5% of the Kingdom's population was killed because of earthquakes. During that period, there were also plague outbreaks. The 17th and 18th century were an era of decline of the kingdom. Corruption was prevalent among the upper and middle classes of the society. Widespread corruption and mistreatment of the lower classes by the feudal lords led to the creation of groups of brigands, attacking the nobility and destroying their fiefs. These groups, which were self-named "mafia", were the foundation of the modern Sicilian Mafia. The escalation of revolts against the monarchy eventually led to the unification with Italy.

The kingdom had a parliament from 1097, which continued to sit throughout the realm's history until the Sicilian Constitution of 1812.

== Demographics ==
By the mid to late 13th century, estimates of the kingdom’s population range from 4 to perhaps 4.5 million, and given the proportion of mountain and pasture-land in the South, some districts must therefore have supported relatively large numbers of people. During the Hohenstaufen era, the Kingdom had 3 towns with a population of over 20,000 each. After the loss of the northern provinces in 1282 during the Sicilian Vespers and several natural disasters like the 1669 Etna eruption, the population of the Kingdom of Sicily was reduced. In 1803, the population of the Kingdom was 1,656,000. The main cities of the Kingdom at that time were Palermo, Catania, Messina, Modica, Syracuse.

Population of the Kingdom of Sicily in 1803
Division	Population
Val di Mazzara	643,000
Val di Demona	521,000
Val di Noto	459,000
Lipari Islands	18,000
Aegadian Islands	12,000
Pantelleria Island	3,000
Total Population	1,656,000

Population of the main cities of the Kingdom of Sicily in 1803
City	Population
Palermo	120,000
Catania	40,000
Messina	36,000
Modica	23,500
Syracuse	17,000

== Economy ==
The high fertility of the land led the Norman kings to bring settlers from neighbouring regions or to resettle farmers to areas where cultivation of land was needed. This led to an increase in agricultural production. The main sources of wealth for the Kingdom of Sicily in that time were its maritime cities, most important of which were the ancient port cities of Naples and its nearby counterpart Amalfi, from which local products were exported. The main export was durum wheat, with other exports including nuts, timber, oil, bacon, cheese, furs, hides, hemp and cloth. Grain and other dry products were measured in salme, which was equivalent to 275.08 litres in the western part of the Kingdom, and 300.3 litres in the eastern part. The salma was divided in 16 tumoli. One tumolo was equivalent to 17,193 litres. Weight was measured in cantari. One cantaro was equivalent to 79.35 kilograms (174.9 lb) and was divided in one hundred rottoli. Cloth was measured in canne. One canna was 2.06 meters long. By the end of the 12th century, Messina had become one of the leading commercial cities of the kingdom.

Under the kingdom, Sicily's products went to many different lands. Among these were Genoa, Pisa, the Byzantine Empire, and Egypt. Over the course of the 12th century, Sicily became an important source of raw materials for north Italian cities such as Genoa. As the centuries went on, however, this economic relationship became less advantageous to Sicily, and some modern scholars see the relationship as definitely exploitative. Furthermore, many scholars believe that Sicily went into decline in the Late Middle Ages, though they do not agree about when this decline occurred. Clifford Backman argues that it is a mistake to see the economic history of Sicily in terms of victimization, and contends that the decline really began in the second part of the reign of Frederick III, in contrast to earlier scholars who believed that Sicilian decline had set in earlier. Where earlier scholars saw late medieval Sicily in continuous decline, Stephen Epstein argued that Sicilian society experienced something of a revival in the 15th century.

Various treaties with Genoa secured and strengthened the commercial power of Sicily.

The feudalisation of society during the Angevin rule reduced royal wealth and treasury. The dependence of the Angevins on north Italian commerce and financing by Florentine bankers were the main factors which led to the decline of the Kingdom's economy. The continuation of the economic decline combined with the increased population and urbanization led to decrease of agrarian production.

In 1800, one-third of the available crops was cultivated with obsolete methods, exacerbating the problem. In the later period of Spanish rule, the trading system was also inefficient compared with previous periods because of high taxes on exports and monopolising corporations which had total control of prices.

== Coinage ==
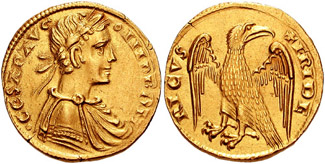
Example of a Messinese augustale

The Norman kings in the 12th century used the tari, which had been used in Sicily from 913 as the basic coin. One tari weighed about one gram and was 16 1/3 carats of gold. The Arab dinar was worth four tari, and the Byzantine solidus six tari. In the kingdom, one onza was equivalent to thirty tari or five florins. One tari was worth twenty grani. One grana was equivalent to six denari. After 1140, the circulation of the copper coin romesina stopped and it was replaced by the follaris. Twenty-four follari were equivalent to one Byzantine miliaresion.

After defeating the Tunisians in 1231, Emperor Frederick II minted the augustalis. It was minted in 21 1/2 carats and weighed 5.28 grams. In 1490, the triumphi were minted in Sicily. They were equivalent to the Venetian ducat. One triumpho was worth 11 1/2 aquilae. One aquila was worth twenty grani. In transactions tari and pichuli were mainly used.

== Religion ==
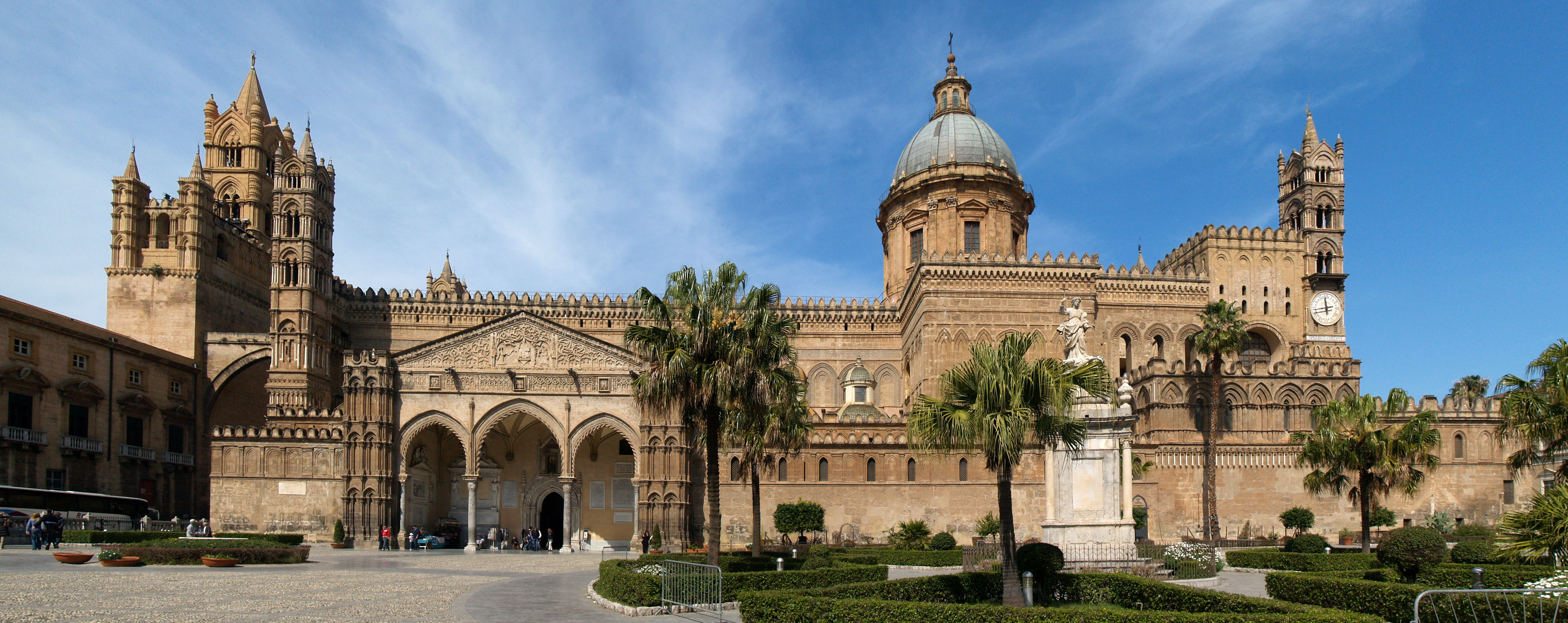
Palermo Cathedral

During the Norman reign, several different religious communities coexisted in the Kingdom of Sicily. These included Latin Catholics, Greek Catholics, Muslims and Jews. Although local religious practices were not interrupted, the fact that Latin Catholics were in power tended to favor Latin Catholicism (Roman Catholicism). Bishops of the Greek rite were obliged to recognize the claims of the Latin Church in Sicily, while Muslim communities were no longer ruled by local emirs. Greek-speaking Christians, Latin Christians, and Muslims interacted on a regular basis, and were involved in each other's lives, economically, linguistically, and culturally. Some intermarried. Catholics living in an Arabic-speaking area might adopt Arabic or even Muslim names. In many cities, each religious community had its own administrative and judicial order. In Palermo, Muslims were allowed to publicly call for prayer in mosques, and their legal issues were settled by qadis, judges who ruled in accordance with Islamic law. Since the 12th century, the Kingdom of Sicily recognized Christianity as the state religion.

After the establishment of Hohenstaufen authority, Latin- and Greek-speaking Catholics maintained their privileges, but the Muslim population was increasingly oppressed. The settlements of Italians brought from northern Italy (who wanted Muslim property for their own) led many Muslim communities to revolt or resettle in mountainous areas of Sicily. These revolts resulted in some acts of violence, and the eventual deportation of Muslims, which began under Frederick II. Eventually, the government removed the entire Muslim population to Lucera in Apulia and Girifalco in Calabria, where they paid taxes and served as agricultural laborers, craftsmen, and crossbowmen for the benefit of the king. The colony at Lucera was finally disbanded in 1300 under Charles II of Naples, and many of its inhabitants sold into slavery. The Jewish community was expelled after the establishment of the Spanish Inquisition from 1493 to 1513 in Sicily. The remaining Jews were gradually assimilated, and most of them converted to Roman Catholicism.

== See also ==
- Angelo da Furci
- County palatine of Cephalonia and Zakynthos
- Emirate of Sicily
- Expedition of the Thousand
- Expulsion of the Jews from Sicily
- Kingdom of Naples
- Kingdom of the Two Sicilies
- Kingdom of Sicily under Savoy
- List of Sicilian monarchs
- Norman–Arab–Byzantine culture
- Norman conquest of southern Italy
- Redshirts
- Sicilian Parliament
- War of the Sicilian Vespers

== Sources ==
- Abulafia, David. Frederick II: A Medieval Emperor, 1988.
- Abulafia, David. The Two Italies: Economic Relations between the Kingdom of Sicily and the Northern Communes, Cambridge University Press, 1977.
- Abulafia, David. The Western Mediterranean Kingdoms 1200–1500: The Struggle for Dominion, Longman, 1997. (a political history)
- Alio, Jacqueline. Queens of Sicily 1061-1266: The Queens Consort, Regent and Regnant of the Norman-Swabian Era of the Kingdom of Sicily, Trinacria, 2018.
- Aubé, Pierre. «Les Empires normands d'Orient, XIe-XIIIe siècles», Paris, rééd. Perrin, 2006.
- Aubé, Pierre. «Roger II de Sicile. Un Normand en Méditerranée», Paris 2001, rééd. Perrin, 2006.
- Fernández-Aceves, Hervin. County and Nobility in Norman Italy: Aristocratic Agency in the Kingdom of Sicily, 1130-1189, Bloomsbury Academic, 2020.
- Fernández-Aceves, Hervin. Royal comestabuli and Military Control in the Sicilian Kingdom: A Prosopographical Contribution to the Study of Italo-Norman Aristocracy, Medieval Prosopography, 34 (2019), pp. 1-40.
- Johns, Jeremy. Arabic administration in Norman Sicily : the royal dīwān, Cambridge University Press, 2002.
- Mallette, Karla (2011). The Kingdom of Sicily, 1100-1250: A Literary History. University of Pennsylvania Press.
- Mendola, Louis. The Kingdom of Sicily 1130-1266: The Norman-Swabian Age and the Identity of a People, Trinacria Editions, New York, 2021.
- Metcalfe, Alex. Muslims and Christians in Norman Sicily: Arabic Speakers and the End of Islam, Routledge, 2002.
- Metcalfe, Alex. The Muslims of Medieval Italy, 2009.
- Norwich, John Julius. Sicily: An Island at the Crossroads of History, 2015.
- Runciman, Steven. The Sicilian Vespers: A History of the Mediterranean World in the Late 13th Century, Cambridge University Press, 1958.
