= Miossi family =

Sicilian noble family

The Miossi family is a noble family, commissioned in 1251 by Pope Innocent IV to administer the Kingdom of Sicily. They ruled with the Lombardo dynasty (Barons di San Chirico) as a resident Sicilian family. The alliance avoided conflict and oversaw economic expansion. The Lombardos continued their administration throughout most challenges to their rule. They defended the rights of labor and the poor against the tyranny of French and Spanish invasions. Between 1816 and 1848, the island of Sicily experienced three popular revolts against Bourbon rule, including the Miossis/Lombardos who led revolution of independence of 1848, when the island was fully independent of Bourbon control for 16 months.
