= Constitutions of Melfi =

Legal code for the Kingdom of Sicily

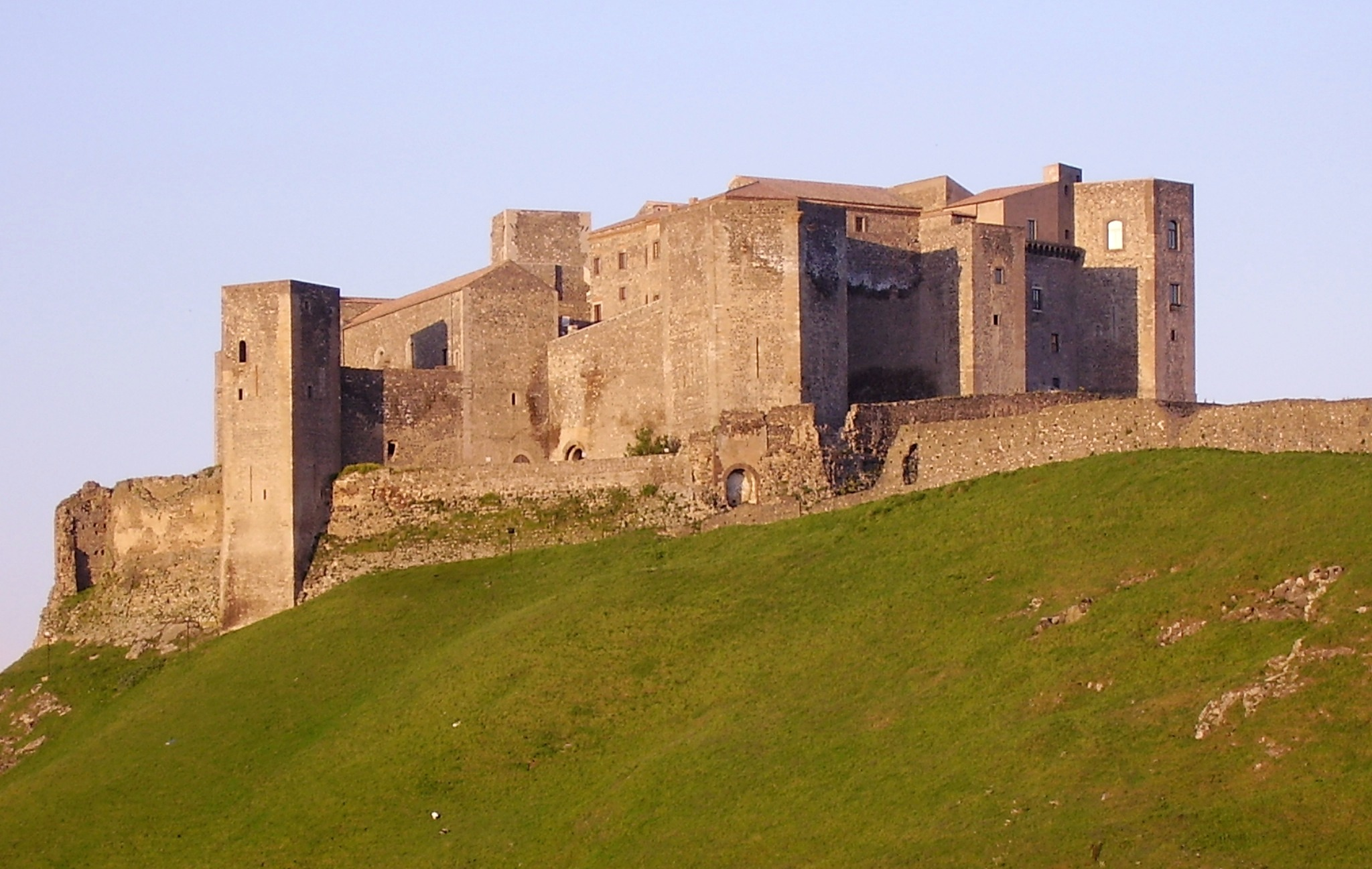
Castle of Melfi where the Constitutions were redacted

The Constitutions of Melfi, or Liber Augustalis, were a new legal code for the Kingdom of Sicily promulgated on 1 September 1231 by Emperor Frederick II. It was given at Melfi, the town from which Frederick's Norman ancestors had first set out to conquer the Mezzogiorno two centuries earlier. Originally a reform of the Assizes of Capua of 1220, themselves his reform of the Assizes of Ariano of 1140, the Constitutions formed the basis of Sicilian law for the next six centuries.

The author of the Constitutions is purported to be Frederick himself, though Giacomo Amalfitano, Archbishop of Capua, appears as an influence as well. He was even reproved by the pope for accepting and advising clauses contrary to the wishes of the church. Traditionally, the work has been attributed to Pier delle Vigne, but it is almost certain that, while Frederick, Giacomo and Pier had their hand in it, the Liber is the product of months of work by a committee.

The Constitutions were written in Latin and translated into Greek before their promulgation. They were meant to apply, as with previous Sicilian law, to all the peoples of the realm: Lombards, Greeks, Saracens, Germans, Jews. The 253 clauses are divided into three books:

- The first regards public law (107 clauses; one of them missing in all manuscripts)
- The second regards judicial procedure (52 clauses)
- The third regards feudal, private, and penal law (94 clauses)

The Constitutions, like the Assizes before them, strengthened the power of the king and diminished the power of his feudatories. The centralising and bureaucratising tendencies of Roger II's legislation continued a century later in the Constitutions. It also continued to emphasise the sacral role and God-given right to rule of the monarch. Frederick II wrote in the Constitutions that "we, whom He elevated beyond hope of man to the pinnacle of the Roman Empire."

Militarily, the Constitutions prohibited bearing arms without permission. A standing Saracen army was created to prevent the king from having to call up the unreliable barons, surely angered by the Constitutions. These, the feudatories, were gravely affected in other ways, too. For example, the sale of fiefs was banned, putting an end to subinfeudation, and all vassals were subject to the king's taxes and other imposts.

Ecclesiastically, the Constitutions affected the bishops as they did all great landholders, but they also affected them in unique ways. The clergymen were made subject to the common courts. They were deprived also of judgement over heretics, prohibited from acquiring lands, and forced to sell inheritances.

Also like the great dioceses and baronies, the cities were affected by the centralising laws which removed their powers and made them more directly subject to not only the king, but his ministers as well. Cities could not become communes, as many in Northern Italy had, and were prohibited from electing consuls or podestàs, on pain of sack and pillage. Like the baronage, the cities were deprived of rights of penal justice. These were transferred to the king and his magistrates alone.

These magistrates or ministers became a more important class. Fewer and fewer noblemen served the king as more and more simple freemen were raised to power. The magistrates were elected for a year pending reaffirmation and received a salary from the state. This made them loyal to the king and his administration, for without it they were nothing. The great officers of the Regno were the ancient ammiratus ammiratorum, the grand protonotary (or logothete), great Chamberlain, great seneschal, great chancellor, great constable, and master justiciar. The last was the head of the Magna Curia, the court of the king (his curia regis) and the final court of appeal. The Magna Curia Rationum, a division of the curia, acted as an auditing department on the great bureaucracy. Other than this, there was a sort of parliament, consisting of not only the barons, but the universities and the landed commoners. It did not debate or rubber-stamp legislation, which was the king's to make and unmake, but merely received it and promulgated, giving its advice where it could.

Economically, state monopolies were imposed on silk, iron, and grain. On the other hand, tariffs on trade within the Regno were abolished. The privileges granted previously to Pisa and Genoa were, however, rescinded. Weights and measures were uniformly regulated across the realm.

Finally, the equality of all citizens before the law was affirmed. The Constitutions made much of reducing the power of the nobility and of following the Roman tradition of equality before the law: thus, all freemen, all citizens, were equals, in theory. Likewise, for the benefit of commoners, Frederick banned trial by ordeal, ordering his judges to use instead "the common methods of proof which have been introduced both by the ancient laws and by our constitutions." The Constitutions notably used reason and logic to dismiss the superstitious foundations of the ordeal; for example, the use of trial by hot iron was dismissed because people believed "the natural heat of white-hot iron grows hot and, what is even more foolish, grows cold for no good reason at all", and trial by water was forbidden because of the belief "that the defendant of the crime, who has been established only by his guilty conscience, will not be received by the element of freezing water, when, in fact, it is the retention of sufficient air that prevents him from submerging." Frederick also banned trial by battle, ordering that more weight be given to the testimony of witnesses, although exceptions to this were granted to knights, and for cases in which no witnesses could be provided.

The Constitutions also contain incidental information relating to the practice of medicine. Frederick proclaimed that, in order to become a medical practitioner, it was necessary to have some practical experience, which many European university-educated doctors did not have in 1231.

According to Ernst Kantorowicz, the Liber "is the birth certificate of the modern administrative state."

The Constitutions of Melfi remained applicable law in the Kingdom of Naples until 1809 and in Sicily until 1819.

== Editions and translations ==
- Powell, James M., ed. (1971). The Liber Augustalis, or Constitutions of Melfi Promulgated By the Emperor Frederick II for the Kingdom of Sicily in 1231. Syracuse University Press.
- Stürner, Wolfgang, ed. (1996). "Die Konstitutionen Friedrichs II. für das Königreich Sizilien". Constitutiones et Acta Publica Imperatorum et Regum, vol. 2 (suppl.). Monumenta Germaniae Historica. Hanover: Hahnsche Buchhandlung.
- Constitutionum Regni Siciliarum (ed. 1773)

== Literature ==
- David Abulafia, Frederick II. A Medieval Emperor (1988), chapter six.
- Messana, Federico. Liber Augustalis o Costituzioni melfitane (1231).
