= Expulsion of the Jews from Sicily =

1493 expulsion of Jews from Spanish-ruled Sicily

The expulsion of the Jews from Sicily began in 1493 when the Spanish Inquisition reached the island of Sicily and its population of more than 30,000 Jews.

== History of Sicilian Jews ==
At the time of its expulsion from Sicily, the Jewish community in Sicily dated back to early Roman times. They were relatively untroubled on the island until the acceptance of the Crown of Aragon in Sicily in 1412. A great number of Jews had reached Sicily after Pompey's 63 BC sacking of Jerusalem.

After their enslavement under Roman rule, Jews in Sicily eventually assimilated into society and worked in professions such as philosophy, medicine, artisanal pursuits, and farming.

The exact number of Jews in Sicily at the time of expulsion is not certain, However, some have put the number of Jewish refugees at 36,000. Also, in 1492, it is known the Jewish populations of Palermo, Messina, and several other cities were considerable, and that there were Giudeccas, or Jewish settlements, in over 50 places in Sicily, ranging in anywhere population from 350 to 5,000. At their height, Jewish Sicilians probably constituted from five to eight percent of the island's population. The expulsion order was not only directed at Sicilian Jews, but also at a small number of Muslims and other religious communities.

== Spanish Inquisition and Jewish Expulsion ==
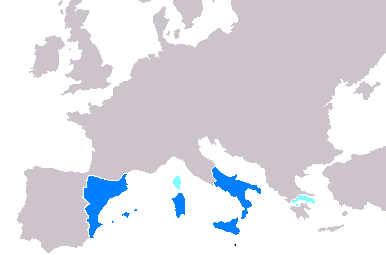
The maximum extent of the Crown of Aragon, including Sicily.

Muslims had ruled much of the Iberian Peninsula since the first invasion in 711. By the late Middle Ages, Christian kings had begun to wage war on the Moors and recapture some of the peninsula. After the marriage of Ferdinand II of Aragon to Queen Isabella I of Castile, the Moors were finally forced out of Granada in 1492, completing the so-called Reconquista of the Iberian Peninsula.

In 1479 Sicily and Malta came under Aragonese rule. In 1492, as part of an attempt to maintain Catholic orthodoxy and purify their kingdom of Moorish influence, Ferdinand and Isabella ordered the forced expulsion or conversion of all Jews on pain of death. The date of the expulsion was extended from 18 September 1492 to 12 January 1493 to allow the extortion of opportunist tax levies.

Following the expulsion of the Jews from Sicily, part of the community sought refuge in southern Italy under the protection of Ferdinand I of Naples. Upon his death and the subsequent Spanish occupation, on November 23, 1510, Ferdinand and Isabella issued a further edict of expulsion of the Jews from all of southern Italy.

Shortly thereafter, even converted Jews could not remain in Sicily and southern Italy, as in May 1515 another decree forced converted Jews to leave the kingdom.

The great part of the Sicilian Jewish community fled to the Ottoman Empire, especially to what is since the 20th century Greece, Cyprus and Turkey, and were well received there. The settlements of those Jews were in Greece and Turkey were large enough great to build their own congregations and to print books.

The Jews have never returned to Sicily. However, in 2005, for the first time since the expulsion, a Passover seder was conducted in Sicily (in Palermo), held by the Milanese progressive rabbi.

== See also ==
- History of the Jews in Sicily
- History of the Jews in Calabria
- Haplogroup G2c (Y-DNA)
