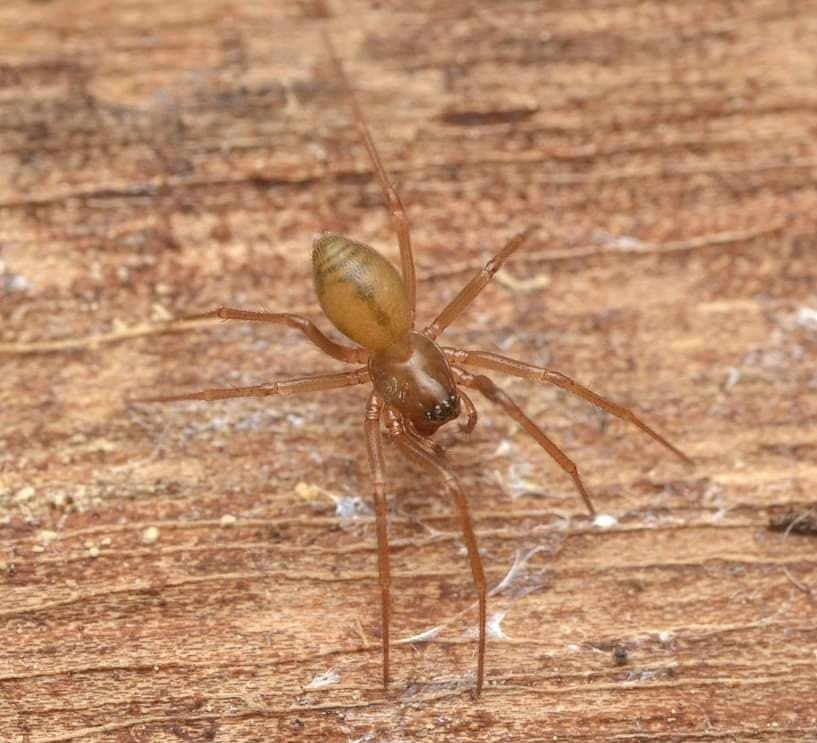
- Mermessus denticulatus
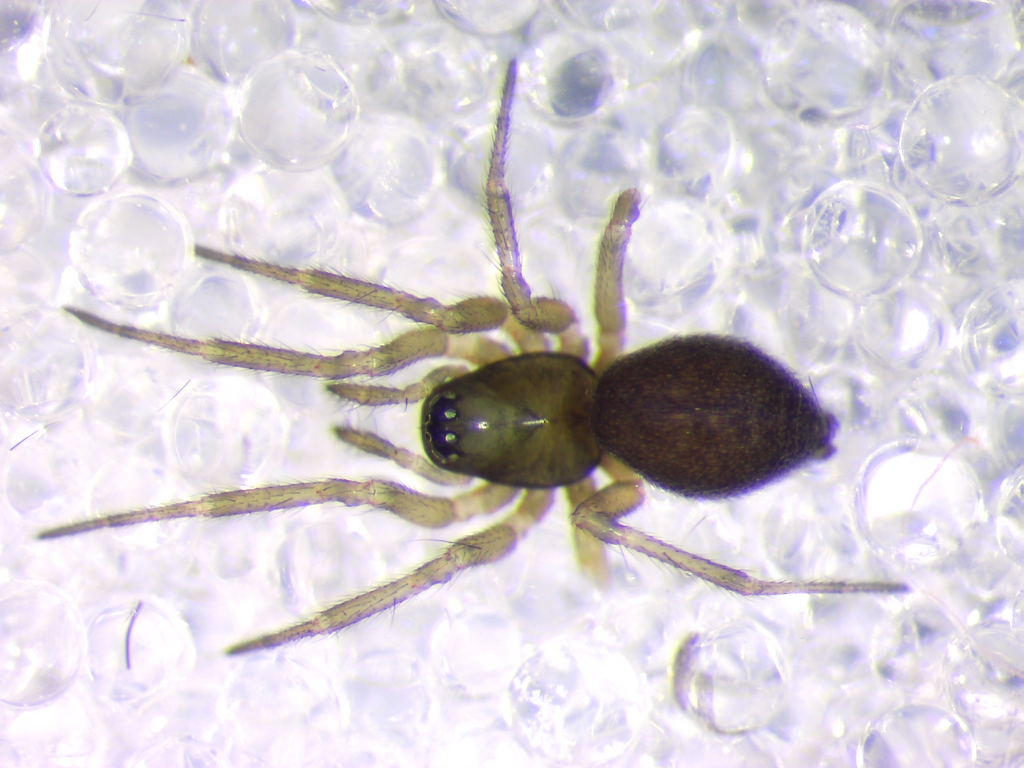
- M. trilobatus

Scientific classification
- Kingdom: Animalia
- Phylum: Arthropoda
- Subphylum: Chelicerata
- Class: Arachnida
- Order: Araneae
- Infraorder: Araneomorphae
- Family: Linyphiidae
- Subfamily: Erigoninae
- Genus: Mermessus; Pickard-Cambridge

Type species
- Mermessus dentiger O. P.-Cambridge, 1899

Species
- 81, see text

Synonyms
- Eperigone Crosby & Bishop, 1928; Parerigone Berland, 1932 (preocc.); Anerigone Berland, 1932 (nom. nov. pro Parerigone Berland, 1932); Sinoria Bishop & Crosby, 1938; Aitutakia Marples, 1960

= Mermessus =

Genus of spiders

Mermessus is a genus of spiders in the family Linyphiidae. It was first described in 1899 by O. Pickard-Cambridge. As of 2017, it contains 81 species.

== Species ==
As of October 2025, this genus includes 82 species:

- Mermessus agressus (Gertsch & Davis, 1937) – United States, Mexico
- Mermessus albulus (Zorsch & Crosby, 1934) – United States
- Mermessus annamae (Gertsch & Davis, 1937) – Mexico
- Mermessus antraeus (Crosby, 1926) – United States, Mexico
- Mermessus augustae (Crosby & Bishop, 1933) – Canada, United States
- Mermessus augustalis (Crosby & Bishop, 1933) – Canada, United States
- Mermessus avius (Millidge, 1987) – Mexico
- Mermessus brevidentatus (Emerton, 1909) – United States
- Mermessus bryantae (Ivie & Barrows, 1935) – North America, Cuba, Venezuela. Introduced to Azores
- Mermessus caelebs (Millidge, 1987) – Panama, Venezuela
- Mermessus coahuilanus (Gertsch & Davis, 1940) – United States, Mexico
- Mermessus cognatus (Millidge, 1987) – Mexico to Costa Rica
- Mermessus colimus (Millidge, 1987) – Mexico
- Mermessus comes (Millidge, 1987) – Mexico
- Mermessus conexus (Millidge, 1987) – Mexico
- Mermessus conjunctus (Millidge, 1991) – Brazil
- Mermessus contortus (Emerton, 1882) – United States
- Mermessus datangensis Irfan, Zhang & Peng, 2022 – China
- Mermessus denticulatus (Banks, 1898) – Canada to Peru, Caribbean. Introduced to Europe, North Africa, Turkey
- Mermessus dentiger O. Pickard-Cambridge, 1899 – USA to Guatemala, Caribbean (type species)
- Mermessus dentimandibulatus (Keyserling, 1886) – Colombia, Peru
- Mermessus dominicus (Millidge, 1987) – Dominican Rep.
- Mermessus dopainus (Chamberlin & Ivie, 1936) – Mexico
- Mermessus entomologicus (Emerton, 1911) – Canada, United States
- Mermessus estrellae (Millidge, 1987) – Mexico
- Mermessus facetus (Millidge, 1987) – Costa Rica
- Mermessus floridus (Millidge, 1987) – United States
- Mermessus formosus (Millidge, 1987) – Mexico
- Mermessus fractus (Millidge, 1987) – Costa Rica
- Mermessus fradeorum (Berland, 1932) – North America. Introduced to Galapagos, Uruguay, Azores, Cyprus, South Africa, Saudi Arabia, China, New Zealand
- Mermessus fuscus (Millidge, 1987) – Mexico
- Mermessus hebes (Millidge, 1991) – Venezuela
- Mermessus holda (Chamberlin & Ivie, 1939) – Canada, United States
- Mermessus hospita (Millidge, 1987) – Mexico
- Mermessus ignobilis (Millidge, 1987) – Mexico
- Mermessus imago (Millidge, 1987) – Mexico
- Mermessus index (Emerton, 1914) – Canada, United States
- Mermessus indicabilis (Crosby & Bishop, 1928) – Canada, United States
- Mermessus inornatus (Ivie & Barrows, 1935) – United States
- Mermessus insulsus (Millidge, 1991) – Peru
- Mermessus jona (Bishop & Crosby, 1938) – Canada, United States
- Mermessus leoninus (Millidge, 1987) – Mexico
- Mermessus libanus (Millidge, 1987) – Mexico
- Mermessus lindrothi (Holm, 1960) – Alaska
- Mermessus maculatus (Banks, 1892) – Russia (Commander Is.), Canada to Guatemala
- Mermessus maderus (Millidge, 1987) – United States
- Mermessus major (Millidge, 1987) – United States
- Mermessus mediocris (Millidge, 1987) – Canada, United States
- Mermessus medius (Millidge, 1987) – Mexico
- Mermessus merus (Millidge, 1987) – Mexico
- Mermessus mniarus (Crosby & Bishop, 1928) – United States
- Mermessus modicus (Millidge, 1987) – United States
- Mermessus montanus (Millidge, 1987) – Mexico
- Mermessus monticola (Millidge, 1987) – Mexico
- Mermessus moratus (Millidge, 1987) – Mexico
- Mermessus naniwaensis (Oi, 1960) – China, Korea, Japan
- Mermessus niger (Millidge, 1991) – Colombia
- Mermessus obscurus (Millidge, 1991) – Colombia
- Mermessus orbus (Millidge, 1987) – Mexico
- Mermessus ornatus (Millidge, 1987) – Mexico
- Mermessus paludosus (Millidge, 1987) – Canada
- Mermessus paulus (Millidge, 1987) – United States
- Mermessus perplexus (Millidge, 1987) – Mexico
- Mermessus persimilis (Millidge, 1987) – Mexico
- Mermessus pinicola (Millidge, 1987) – Mexico
- Mermessus probus (Millidge, 1987) – Mexico
- Mermessus proximus (Keyserling, 1886) – Peru
- Mermessus rapidulus (Bishop & Crosby, 1938) – Nicaragua, Costa Rica, Panama
- Mermessus singularis (Millidge, 1987) – Mexico
- Mermessus socius (Chamberlin, 1949) – United States
- Mermessus sodalis (Millidge, 1987) – United States
- Mermessus solitus (Millidge, 1987) – United States
- Mermessus solus (Millidge, 1987) – Mexico
- Mermessus subantillanus (Millidge, 1987) – Guadeloupe
- Mermessus taibo (Chamberlin & Ivie, 1933) – Canada, United States
- Mermessus tenuipalpis (Emerton, 1911) – Canada, United States
- Mermessus tepejicanus (Gertsch & Davis, 1937) – Mexico
- Mermessus tibialis (Millidge, 1987) – United States
- Mermessus tlaxcalanus (Gertsch & Davis, 1937) – Mexico
- Mermessus tridentatus (Emerton, 1882) – Canada, United States, Puerto Rico
- Mermessus trilobatus (Emerton, 1882) – North America. Introduced to Azores, Europe
- Mermessus undulatus (Emerton, 1914) – Canada, United States
