= Assizes of Ariano =

1140 royal legislation of Roger II of Sicily

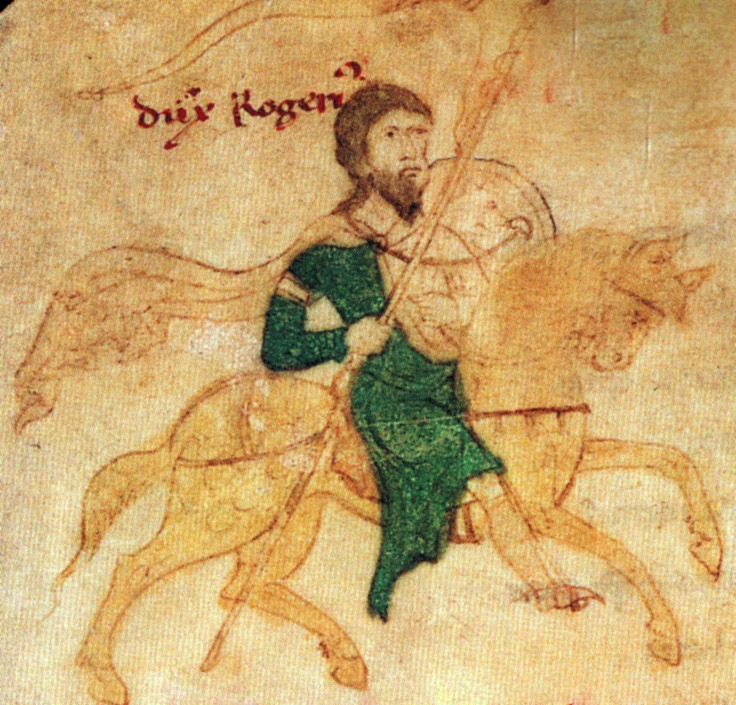
Roger II of Sicily

The Assizes of Ariano were a set of royal enactments promulgated by Roger II for the Kingdom of Sicily at Ariano in the summer of 1140. They are generally regarded as a major statement of royal legislation in the Norman kingdom, addressing matters such as public security, ecclesiastical jurisdiction, property, fiscal rights, and military obligations.

Earlier scholarship often treated the assizes as straightforward evidence of a fully centralized monarchy and of a coherent feudal order under strict royal supervision. More recent work has stressed instead the composite character of the kingdom and the contingent, negotiated nature of aristocratic power, military service, and territorial administration in the mainland provinces.

== Context ==
Roger II issued the assizes after consolidating his authority in southern mainland Italy in the late 1130s. Rather than marking the simple completion of a centralized legal order, the legislation formed part of an ongoing attempt to define royal jurisdiction in a kingdom marked by legal, linguistic, and religious plurality.

The assizes have often been linked to the wider reorganization of the mainland after Roger's victories over rebellious counts and barons. In this interpretation, the legislation belongs to a broader effort to render counties, lordships, military obligations, and aristocratic relationships more legible and governable from the center, without implying that noble power had ceased to be negotiated in practice.

== Content ==
The fullest surviving text contains forty-four assizes and a prologue. The legislation addresses ecclesiastical matters, royal rights, criminal law, marriage, public order, and military service.

The prologue explicitly justifies legislation by reference to the diversity of peoples subject to Roger's rule. The assizes did not abolish customary law so much as subordinate it to royal supervision where custom conflicted with the interests of the crown.

The enactments are therefore important not only for what they prescribe, but also for how they articulate the relationship between royal jurisdiction and older local, ethnic, and customary distinctions within the kingdom.

== Text and transmission ==
The assizes survive in two composite juridical manuscripts. The fuller text is preserved in Vatican Latin 8782, usually dated to the late twelfth century, and contains forty-four assizes together with a prologue. The other manuscript, Monte Cassino 468, dates to the first half of the thirteenth century and preserves an abbreviated version together with several additions absent from the Vatican text.

The modern critical edition was published by Evelyn Jamison in 1972. The textual tradition is complicated, and the surviving manuscripts do not permit certainty in every case about what should be regarded as omission, abbreviation, or later addition.

== Historiography ==
Kenneth Pennington has argued that the Assizes of Ariano were among the earliest major examples of territorial legislation in medieval Europe to draw self-consciously on Roman law, while still leaving room for local custom within the kingdom's plural legal order.

James Hill has reinterpreted the assizes and related mainland evidence in connection with recruitment and the administration of armies in the Norman kingdom, emphasizing that royal government was concerned with the practical mobilization of service rather than merely with abstract legal uniformity.

Hervin Fernández-Aceves has pushed the debate further by arguing that the assizes should not be read as the simple constitutional expression of a finished centralized state or of a stable feudal hierarchy. Read alongside the Catalogus Baronum and other mainland evidence, they belong instead to an ongoing process through which the crown sought to make counties, lordships, military obligations, and negotiated aristocratic relationships more legible and governable.

In this interpretation, the expeditiones were not merely reactive measures against external threats, including Byzantine intervention, but part of a contingent military organization grounded in negotiated noble relationships and supplemented by parallel royal mechanisms of coordination, notably through the comestabuli.

== Sources ==
- Jaqueline Alio. "Assizes of Ariano in Latin".
- "The Consolidation of Power: the Assizes of Ariano" (PDF). Norman World. Archived from the original on 2005-02-06.
- Fernández-Aceves, Hervin (2019). "Royal comestabuli and Military Control in the Sicilian Kingdom: A Prosopographical Contribution to the Study of Italo-Norman Aristocracy". Medieval Prosopography. 34: 1–40.
- Fernández-Aceves, Hervin (2020). County and Nobility in Norman Italy: Aristocratic Agency in the Kingdom of Sicily, 1130-1189. London: Bloomsbury Academic.
- Hill, James (2013). "The Catalogus Baronum and the Recruitment and Administration of the Armies of the Norman Kingdom of Sicily: A Re-Examination". Historical Research. 86 (231): 1–14. doi:10.1111/j.1468-2281.2012.00605.x.
- Jamison, Evelyn, ed. (1972). Catalogus Baronum. Rome: Istituto storico italiano per il Medio Evo.
- Norwich, John Julius (1970). The Kingdom in the Sun 1130-1194. London: Longman.
- Pennington, Kenneth (2006). "The Birth of the Ius Commune: King Roger II's Legislation". Rivista internazionale di diritto comune. 17.
