= Sack of Manfredonia =

1620 Ottoman attack on Manfredonia

Coordinates: 41°37′50″N 15°55′21″E

- Part of the Spanish–Ottoman wars and Ottoman–Habsburg wars
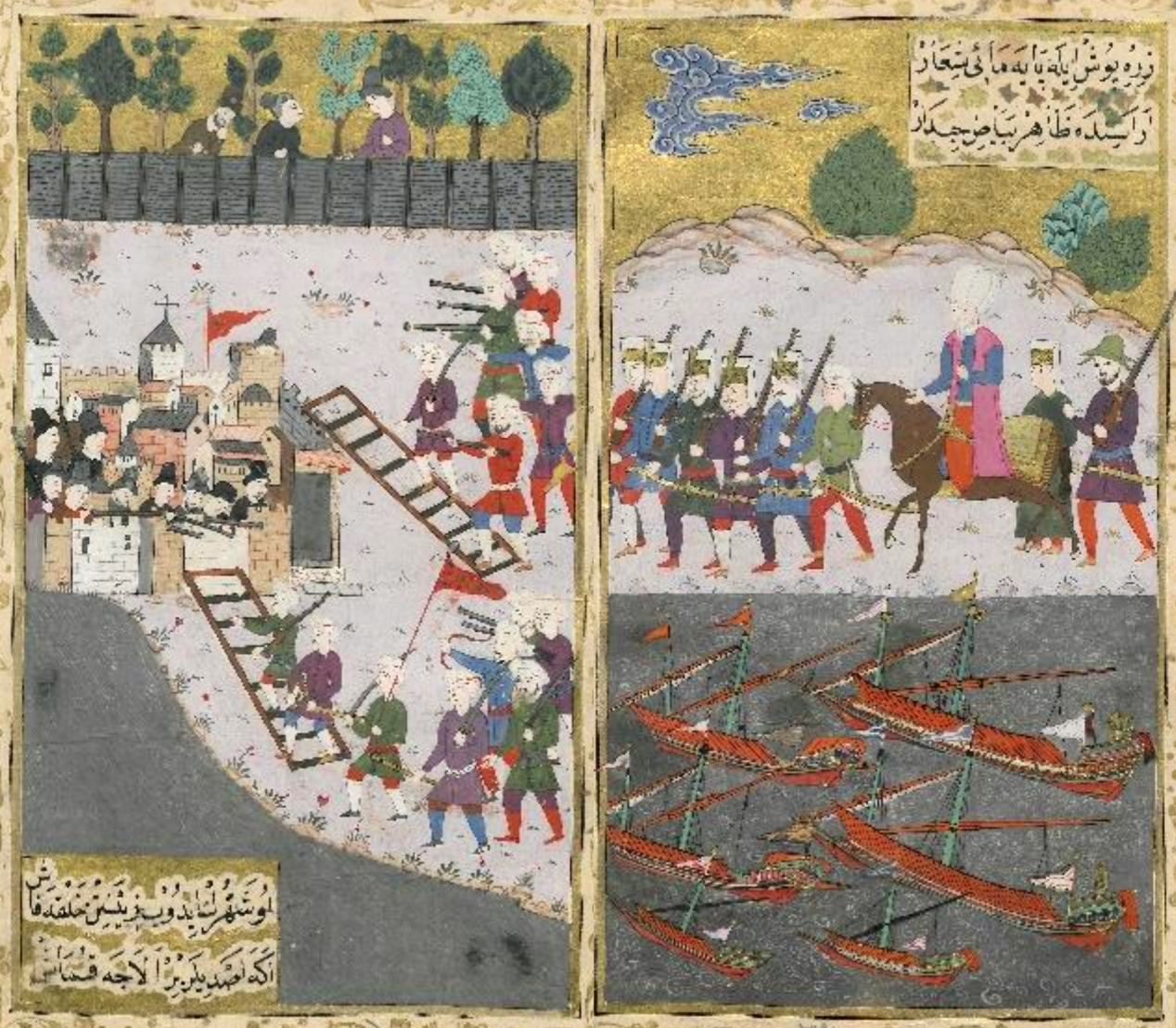
- Details from a miniature in the Şehnāme-i Nādirī depicting Halil Pasha's campaign on Manfredonia (Topkapı Palace Museum Library, H. 1124, 40b-41a)
Date	16–18 August 1620 (3 days)
Location	Manfredonia, Kingdom of Naples
Result	Ottoman victory

Belligerents
Ottoman Empire	Kingdom of Naples

Commanders and leaders
(Ottoman Empire) Damat Halil Pasha (Ottoman Empire) Hüseyin Ağa	(Kingdom of Naples) Antonio Perez (Kingdom of Naples) Fernando de Velasco (surrendered) (Kingdom of Naples) Francesco Carafa

Strength
c. 40–60 galleys >6,000 men (up to 12,000 men according to some sources)	c. 20+ men under Perez c. 100 men under Velasco c. 800–1,000 men under Carafa

Casualties and losses
100–700 killed 7 captured	Some killed (up to 500 people according to some sources); Some wounded c. 200–500 inhabitants captured and enslaved

The Sack of Manfredonia (Italian: sacco di Manfredonia or presa di Manfredonia, "capture of Manfredonia") was an Ottoman attack on the city of Manfredonia in Apulia, then part of the Kingdom of Naples, in August 1620. The incursion, which was led by Damat Halil Pasha, appears to have been launched in retaliation for an attack on Sousse by a Spanish-led force the previous year.

Manfredonia's defences had been neglected prior to the attack, and Ottoman forces numbering at least 6,000 men were able to enter and sack the city on 16 August, the same day that they landed. Governor Antonio Perez attempted to organise a defence but soon fled the city along with many residents, while the Castello di Manfredonia under the command of castellan Fernando de Velasco held out for another day. After an army under Francesco Carafa failed to relieve the city, the castle surrendered and the people who had taken refuge inside were allowed to leave unharmed.

After plundering and burning the city and its castle, the Ottomans abandoned Manfredonia on 18 August. During the sacking, a few hundred residents were captured and enslaved and others were killed. Ottoman casualties appear to have been light. The looting and physical destruction was extensive, with many churches and other buildings being damaged or destroyed and historical records being lost.

== Background and prelude ==
The sack of Manfredonia was not the first Ottoman incursion in Apulia: in 1480 Ottoman forces captured Otranto and held it for over a year, while Lesina was destroyed in 1537, Vieste was sacked in 1554 and Tremiti was besieged in 1567. Several localities in Apulia and nearby Abruzzo and Molise were sacked after an Ottoman landing in Pescara.

In August 1619, a joint Christian fleet attacked the city of Sousse in Ottoman Tunisia. The attack was unsuccessful, and the following year, a combined fleet of 40 Neapolitan, Sicilian, Genoese, Hospitaller and Tuscan galleys assembled at Messina on Sicily. Prior to the sack of Manfredonia, the sailing season of 1620 had seen some minor engagements in the Mediterranean, including the sack of Castel Tornese by the Hospitallers on 3 June and the capture of a Bizertan flagship by the Tuscans on 26 June.

The Ottomans had also prepared a fleet of between 40 and 60 galleys during the winter of 1620, and in spring the fleet departed Constantinople and stopped at Chios, Euboea and Navarino. The fleet was under the command of Damat Halil Pasha – referred to as Alì Pascià in Italian sources – and it carried over 6,000 men. Some sources give higher figures of 10,000 or 12,000 men, but these numbers are probably exaggerated. The number of ships also varies from source to source, with some giving the exact number as 47, 54, 55, 56, or about 60 galleys. After Navarino, the fleet continued to sail up the Greek and Albanian coastline and visited Valona and Durazzo. This marked the Ottomans' first incursion into the Adriatic Sea in a long time, and they captured two Christian ships which had been carrying wheat. The Ottomans encountered a Venetian fleet near Durazzo, but no hostilities ensued and they continued their voyage after exchanging courtesies with the Venetian commander Civran. Meanwhile, the combined Christian fleet remained in Messina.

The Ottomans decided to attack an Italian coastal settlement in retaliation for Spanish and Hospitaller attacks including the Sousse expedition. Some sources claim that Brindisi was selected as the initial target, but after the fleet was spotted by sentries they revised their plans and headed to Manfredonia, a prosperous city and port in the Capitanata which had a population of around 2,400 people. It was fortified with a series of defensive walls and a castle, and it had successfully resisted a siege by a French army led by Odet de Foix, Viscount of Lautrec during the War of the League of Cognac almost a century earlier in 1528. By the eve of the Ottoman attack, the city's defences had been neglected and Pedro Téllez-Girón, 3rd Duke of Osuna who had been Viceroy of Naples until June 1620, had deprived it of artillery pieces which were instead used to arm the Neapolitan navy. The civil authorities lacked an adequate supply of gunpowder, weaponry and ammunition, and at the time of the attack it also lacked manpower as many residents were away for the harvest and some others were sick.

== Attack ==
=== Landing and sack of the city ===
At around 09:40 on 10 August 1620, two galleys arrived in Manfredonia's harbour and four men disembarked and entered the city. Some sources state that these were spies sent by the Ottoman commander while others state that they were Venetian. The men reportedly attended Mass in the cathedral, reconnoitered the castle and fortifications, and claimed that a Venetian fleet of 55 ships was on its way to the city. The galleys sailed to Vieste on 11 August but returned to Manfredonia shortly afterwards, and the alleged spies left during the night on 13 August.

At dawn on 16 August, the Ottoman fleet arrived off Manfredonia and landed at the Chianca Masiello inlet about 4 miles (6.4 km) away from the city. One source claims that some 5,000 Ottomans disembarked, including Janissaries. The Agha of the Janissaries, Hüseyin Ağa, was appointed commander of the troops on land. The invaders are said to have included Turks, Moors, and former Christians who had converted to Islam; one source claimed that an Ottoman army general was a renegade Knight of Malta. The Ottomans arranged their infantry into three squadrons and marched to Manfredonia; on the way they burnt buildings including the monastery of Santa Maria delle Grazie and a Capuchin convent, set fire to fields and vineyards, and killed livestock.

When the fleet was first spotted, Manfredonia's governor Antonio Perez and the castellan Fernando de Velasco initially believed it to be Venetian, but some citizens were wary and began fleeing through the Porta delle Palme. Residents of nearby Monte Sant'Angelo who been on their way to the city to sell their wares saw the Ottomans landing and attempted to raise the alarm before they fled to higher ground to save themselves. The authorities in Manfredonia sent three horsemen to the site of the landing, and after about an hour one of them returned and alerted the city of the imminent attack. This led to a general sense of panic, and some people took refuge in the castle, churches, empty granaries, a casemate near the Ponte della Porta, in water cisterns or in their own homes. Others fled towards the Gargano mountains and to nearby towns in the Tavoliere area.

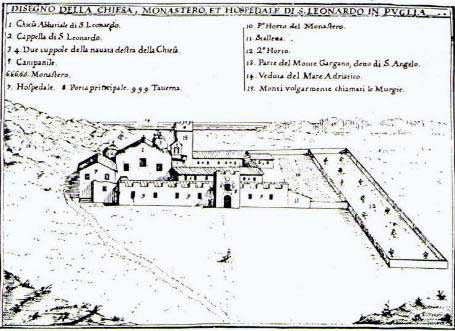
Illustration of the Abbazia di San Leonardo in Lama Volara, where some residents of Manfredonia took refuge during the sack

The Governor attempted to organise a defence of the most vulnerable gate, the Porta di Monte, with a small force of some 20 citizens and some other fighters on horseback, but the rest of the walls were unmanned and the Ottomans were able to scale them using ladders. They set fire to one of the gates, entered the city, and the Governor's defence quickly collapsed. He attempted to retreat to the castle, but was unable to do and he fled the city altogether. By around 08:40, the Ottomans were in control of the whole city except for the castle and they started looting, capturing people, and setting fire to buildings. One source states that over 300 people were taken as slaves at this point, while the elderly, infirm and children were killed; another source states that the majority of the enslaved were women, but some men were also taken. After the Ottomans entered the city, a group of clerics and over 50 other men and women managed to escape to the Abbazia di San Leonardo in Lama Volara.

=== Assault on the castle ===
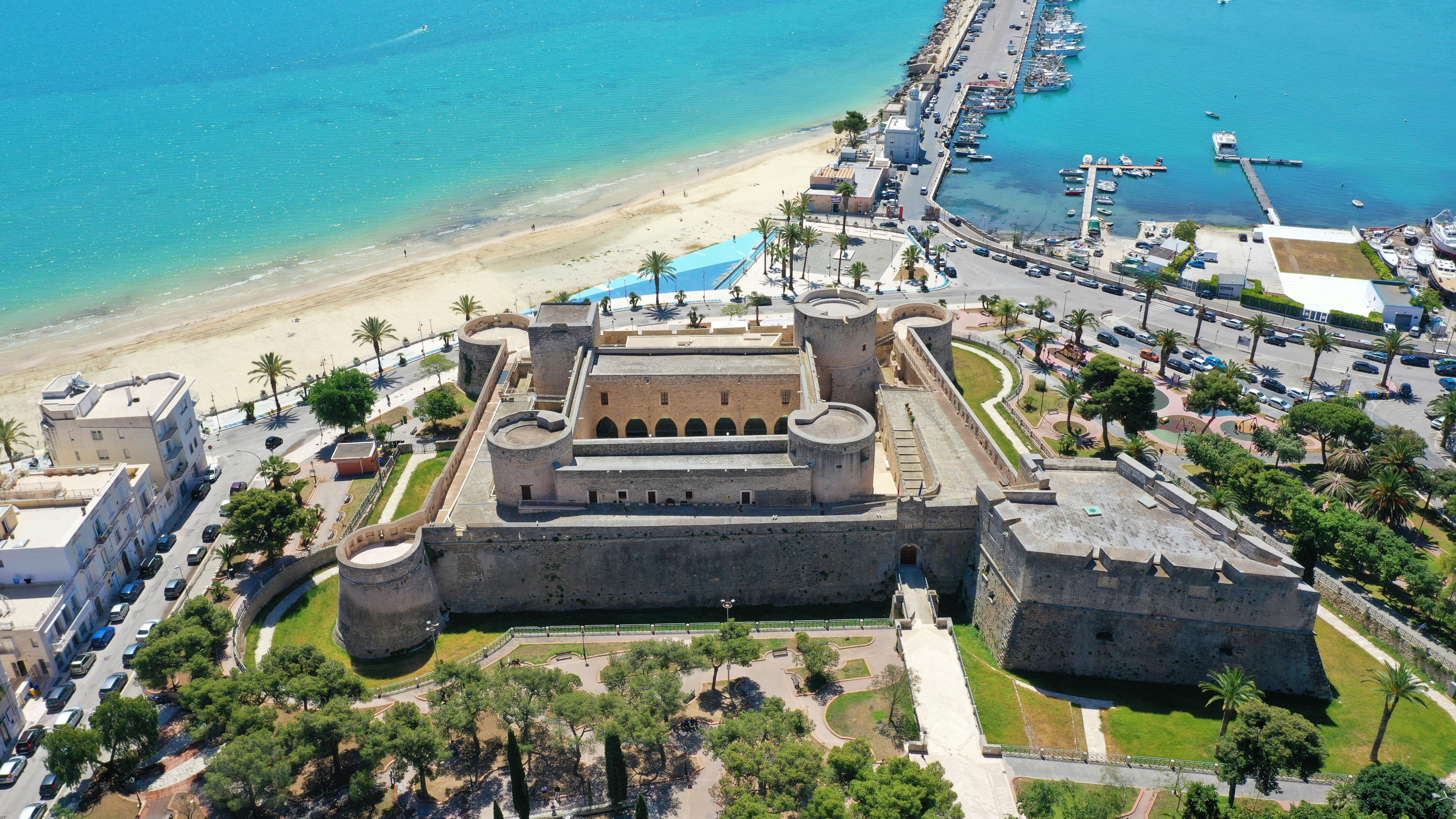
Aerial view of the Castello di Manfredonia as photographed in 2021

At around 10:40, the Ottomans began an attack on the castle where the remaining defenders and some 1,500 citizens had retreated. Arquebusiers were stationed on nearby buildings which overlooked the castle including the palaces of the Vischi and Cessa families, and some galleys approached from the sea and also opened fire. The men in the castle returned fire, and the skirmish lasted for seven hours until around 17:00. Not wanting to spend the night in the captured city and fearing the possibility of a counterattack, the Ottomans retreated back to their ships with their loot. At this point the defenders made some desperate attempts to better their position, and although some soldiers proposed to demolish the tall buildings which overlooked the castle no attempt was actually made to do this.

The Ottomans later returned and marched through the streets of Manfredonia, beating their drums and mocking the Christians by wearing mitres stolen from churches. At dawn on the following day, 17 August, the assault on the castle resumed with greater force; one source stated that 1,500 Ottoman soldiers and four ships were involved in this attack. They attacked the castle from three sides, and after seizing control of its guardhouse which had been defended by two crossbowmen, they entered its ditch and raised ladders in an attempt to take the castle's Annunziata tower.

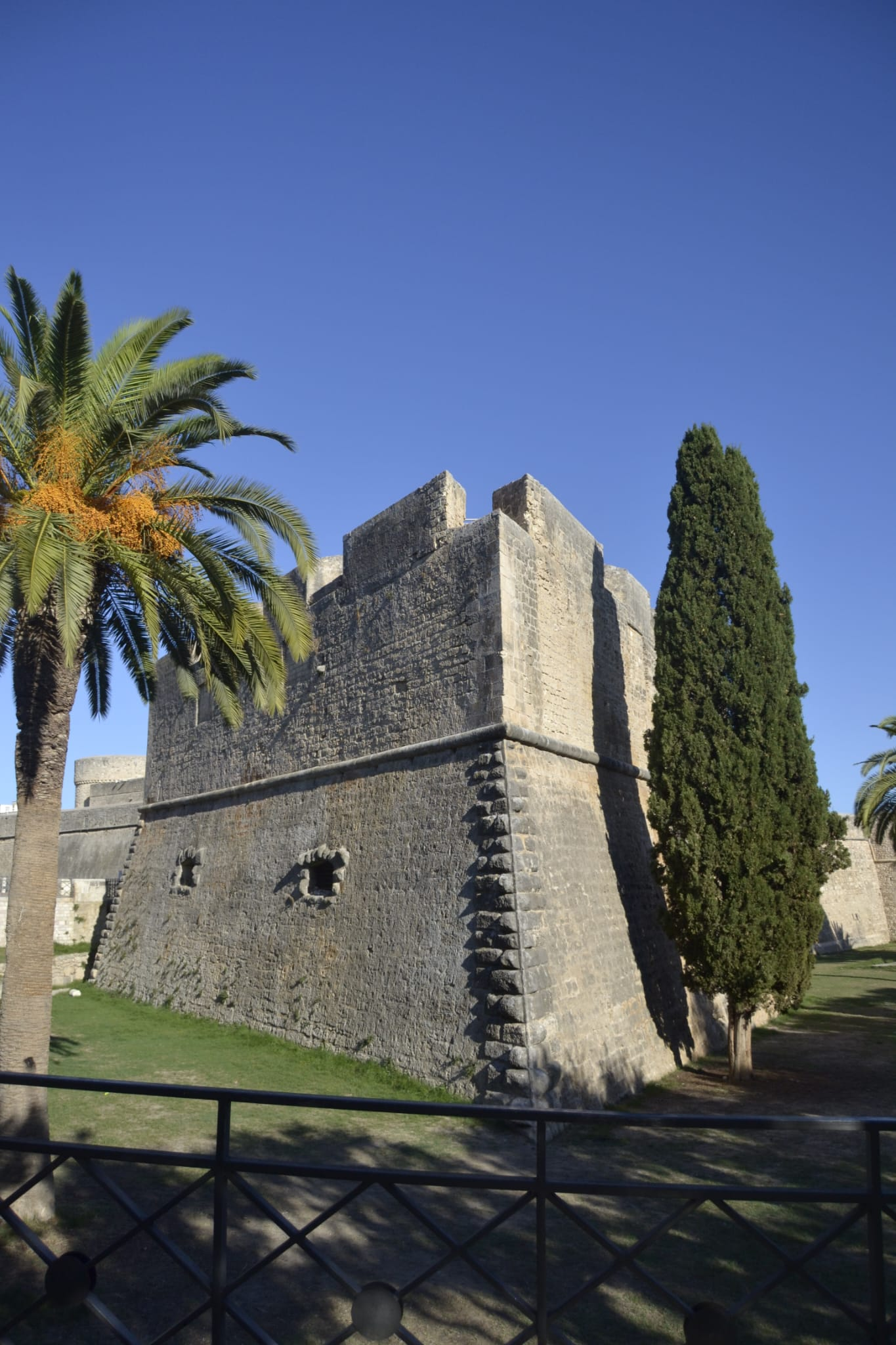
The castle's Annunziata bastion as photographed in 2025

Meanwhile, the governor and captain of the province of Capitanata, Francesco Carafa, had been notified of the attack and he attempted to relieve Manfredonia. He had a force of 400 infantry and 400 cavalry, with some sources claiming that he had up to 1,000 men. The reinforcements arrived at San Leonardo from Lucera, but as they attempted to approach Manfredonia through a coastal road near the site of ancient Siponto, they were fired upon by Ottoman galleys which had taken positions aimed at preventing aid from reaching the city. Fearing casualties from naval bombardments and seeing that Manfredonia was already burning, Carafa retreated and the Ottomans resumed their attack on the castle.

The castle had a garrison of around 100 Italians and Spaniards, but at this point only 30 men who could fight were left as 30 others had been wounded or killed and 40 others were infirm. Two gentlemen among the castle's defenders, Melchionne Visco and Giovanni Carlo di Nicastro, were killed by Ottoman musketeers on 17 August. The defenders managed to throw down the attackers' ladders, but were eventually exhausted and at 15:40 they raised a white flag and began negotiations for a surrender. Two representatives, a Spaniard and an Italian identified as lieutenant Cornecchia and Antonio Stellatello in some sources, were sent to negotiate terms with the Pasha on board his galley.

Initially the castellan is said to have only attempted to secure his own safety, that of his family and belongings, and that of the families of the Spanish soldiers. The citizens in the castle became suspicious of the castellan's intentions, and at around 16:40 a third negotiator, Antonio Nicastro, was sent and the castellan promised to abide by the new terms he negotiated. At this point the Ottoman commanders were eager to conclude the surrender, thinking that Carafa's retreat had been a tactical maneuver and that further reinforcements might be on the way. An agreement was reached in which the castle would be surrendered in return for the safety of all of those who had taken refuge inside.

The Ottomans respected these terms and several hundred people – including the castellan, the officers and soldiers under his command, their families, and some women, elderly and nuns – were allowed to leave the castle and the city on 18 August; they initially took refuge at San Leonardo. The Ottomans then entered and plundered the castle, capturing its gunpowder stores, armaments and provisions. They loaded their ships with these spoils and with plunder from the rest of the city, including more artillery pieces, silverware, furniture, and church bells. Churches were desecrated and relics were stolen or destroyed. The invaders burnt the castle and other buildings including churches and monasteries, reportedly including one in which there were still four infirm nuns. Among the slaves taken by the Ottomans were four nobles whose carriage was overtaken while they were trying to escape. The Ottomans then abandoned the city, embarked and set sail by 21:00 on 18 August.

=== Casualties ===
One source claims that Ottoman casualties were 100 killed and 7 taken alive by Carafa's men; these prisoners reportedly stated that they had also intended to attack Barletta, Bari and Monopoli. The number of residents of Manfredonia who were captured as slaves during the attack varies from source to source, with some giving a figure of 200, 300, 400, or 450 people. A 1680 account by Pompeo Sarnelli gives considerably higher casualties on both sides, stating that 700 Turks and 500 Christians were killed and 500 Christians were enslaved. The names of a few of the enslaved men have been recorded, but with the exception of Giacoma Beccarini as detailed below, documentation is lacking regarding the enslaved women and girls who made up the majority of those taken captive.

== Aftermath ==
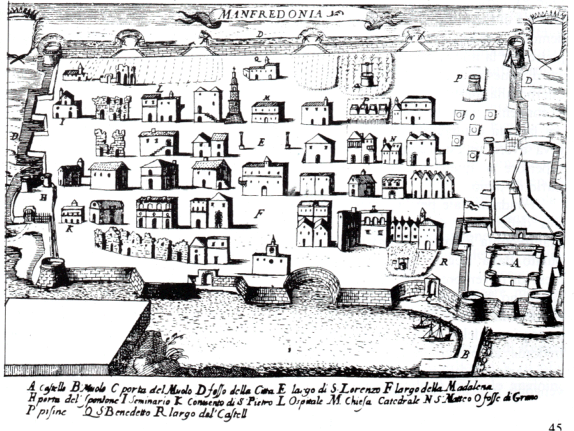
Map of Manfredonia published in Il Regno di Napoli in Prospettiva by Giovan Battista Pacichelli, 1703

On 28 August, the governor and castellan were summoned to Naples to account for their actions during the sacking. The subsequent fate of governor Perez is unknown, and the castellan was tried, acquitted and reinstated, but he died shortly afterwards. When news of the sack spread, the Papal Navy joined the combined Christian fleet which had assembled at Messina. 18 galleys were sent to attack the Ottomans, but they only reached Salento while an advance party proceeded to Otranto, where they learnt that the Ottomans had resumed their journey east. The Christian galleys returned to Messina and later dispersed, while the Ottomans returned to Chios unhindered. Halil Pasha went to Constantinople to present a share of the loot and captives to the sultan.

Surviving residents who had been displaced took refuge in various localities within the Terre del Monte, the Capitanata and the Terra di Bari or with relatives or friends living elsewhere; many of these never returned to Manfredonia. The nuns of San Benedetto were welcomed in convents in Monte Sant'Angelo, Foggia and Troia. Authorities attempted to encourage repopulation through granting tax exemptions and moratoria, and the city's Archbishop obtained such privileges from Viceroys Gaspar de Borja y Velasco and Antonio Zapata y Cisneros. Some residents did return to the city, as did some new settlers, but these efforts were hampered by the widespread destruction along with other issues including disease outbreaks and economic problems. Manfredonia's population stood at some 1,300 inhabitants in 1633, and it took until the second half of the 17th century for the population to increase back to pre-1620 levels.

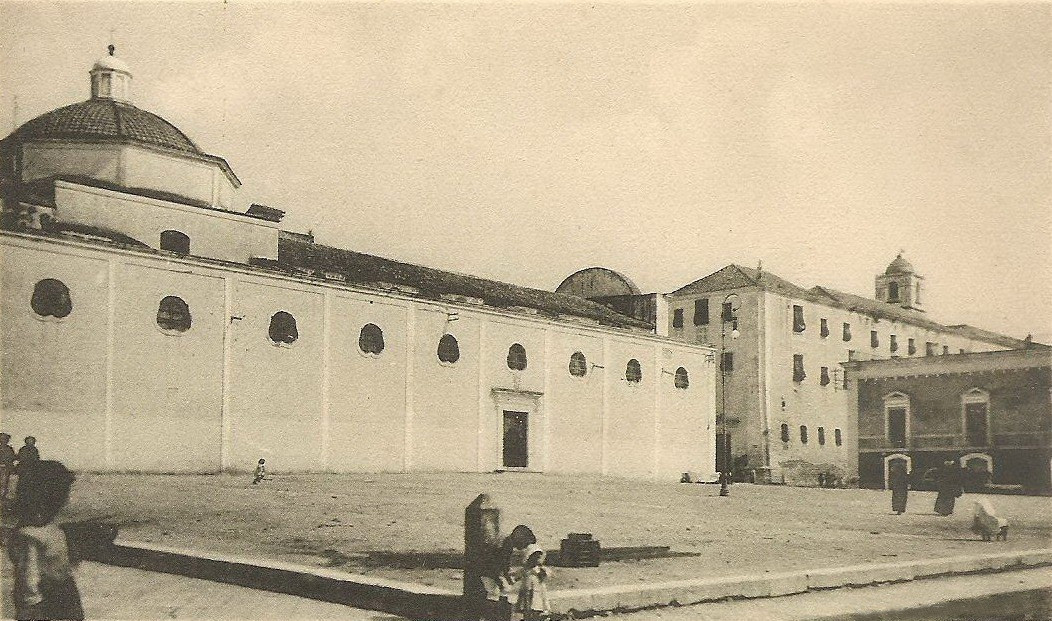
The cathedral which was constructed to replace the original one destroyed in 1620, as depicted in an early 20th century photograph

Large parts of the city were burnt during the sack, and the city's cathedral was among the churches destroyed. The church of San Marco was subsequently used as a temporary cathedral until a new one was built between 1624 and 1640. Some of the damaged churches and monasteries were repaired or rebuilt in the years after the attack, while others such as the monastery of Santa Maria delle Grazie located outside the city walls were demolished. According to Sarnelli, the effects of the sack were still evident some six decades later, with less than one third of the city being habitable during his time. Some other authors describe the city as never having fully recovered from the sack.

Some efforts to improve defences were made in the aftermath of the attack. Zapata sent a fleet to Manfredonia on 21 April 1621, and artillery was sent to Vieste which was considered to be a likely target for a similar Ottoman incursion. Zapata ordered the new captain, Gonzalo Ribero, to construct parapets and quarters for troops stationed in the castle of Manfredonia, and orders were also issued to demolish the tall buildings from where the Ottomans had targeted the castle. Provisions and ammunition were also sent, but in 1623 it was noted that this was still not enough and the city's defences were reported to be lacking. Ottoman raids on other coastal targets in the Italian peninsula continued until the late 17th century, including attacks on Chianca Marina and San Nicandro Gargano in 1672.

== Legacy ==
=== Sources and analysis ===
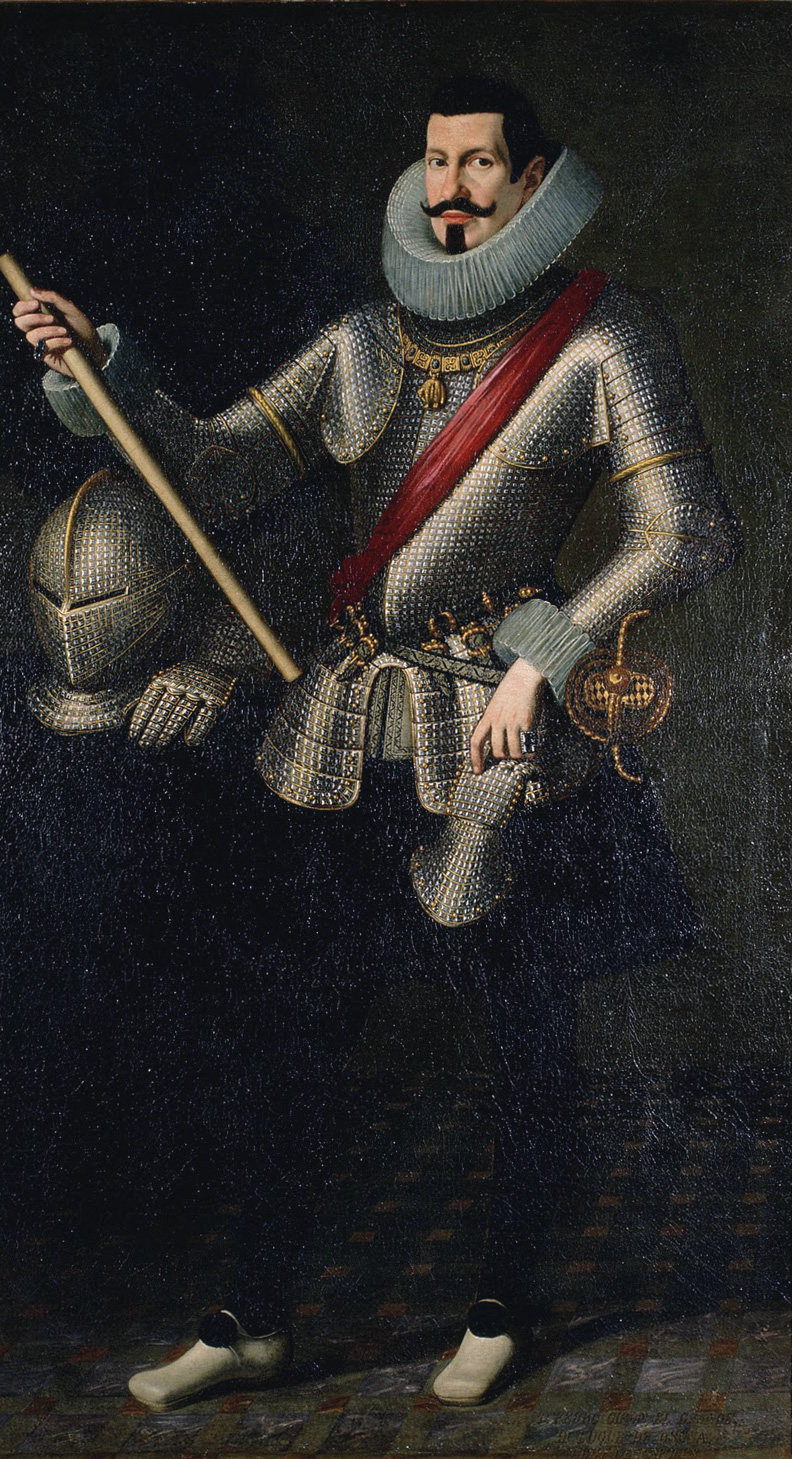
Pedro Téllez-Girón, 3rd Duke of Osuna as painted by Bartolomé González y Serrano, 1615

Antonio Nicastro, who had negotiated the castle's surrender, compiled an official report entitled Relazione della presa di Manfredonia dai Turchi on behalf of P. Gabriele da Cerignola. This has been preserved at the Archivio della Curia Provincializia dei P.P. Cappuccini di Foggia, and it is the most detailed primary source about the sacking. Two other manuscript accounts written by anonymous authors are also known and have been preserved at the Biblioteca della Deputazione Napoletana di Storia Patria. One of these is critical of the Duke of Osuna and was likely written by an opponent of the Spanish administration, while the other is an eyewitness report which was sent to the Archbishop of Manfredonia, Annibale Serugo de Gimnasiis, by a member of the cathedral chapter of Siponto.

An account of the sacking was published in Cronologia dei Vescovi e Arcivescovi Sipontini (1680) by historian Pompeo Sarnelli; in this work the attack was referred to as a massacre (Italian: eccidio di Manfredonia). The attack is also referred to in Il Pellegrino al Gargano (1680), a religious and hagiographical work by Marcello Cavaglieri which claims that divine intervention prevented the Ottomans from attacking other localities besides Manfredonia. Cavaglieri wrote that while the Ottomans were in the city, the archangel Michael miraculously appeared with an army of 6,000 mounted warriors on the Gargano cliffs, and this is said to have prevented the Turkish general from sacking the rest of the Gargano. Cavaglieri claimed that this miracle was witnessed by some of the residents who were taken as slaves and were later ransomed.

The sack was a significant blow to the prestige of the Spanish Neapolitan viceroyalty, and it has been noted that factors which allowed it to happen included poor governance and a lack of preparedness. The conduct of Perez, Velasco and Carafa have also been criticised. There have been some allegations that the Duke of Osuna might have been involved in the planning of the attack, and there were rumours that he was in league with the Ottomans as part of a wider plot to take the Neapolitan crown for himself. These allegations are unlikely to be true, and were possibly spread by opponents of the Duke after his fall from power in Naples.

=== Loss of historical records ===
The sacking is believed to have resulted in the destruction and looting of many historical records. According to Sarnelli, all public and private, ecclesiastical and lay documents, including records of privileges which had been bestowed upon the city by kings and princes, were destroyed during the sack. Matteo Spinelli, writing in 1785, stated that the Sipontine archive had indeed been lost, but he claimed that rather than being burnt by the Ottomans, many documents were stolen by the Sipontines under the pretext of saving them and by the Montanari (inhabitants of Monte Sant'Angelo) who are said to have subjected the city to il secondo sacco (the second sacking).

The veracity of Sarnelli's and Spinelli's claims remains unclear. Some documents are known to have been taken by the Ottomans to Constantinople and some of them were later recovered, including the Liber reddituum et bonorum which was returned to the Curia in 1633.

=== Giacoma Beccarini ===
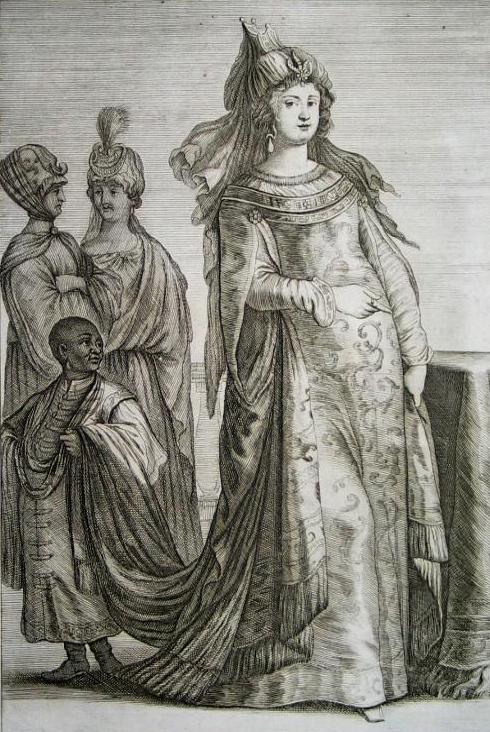
Engraving of Zafire Hatun published in a 1707 edition of the Theatrum Europaeum. Zafire is sometimes identified as Giacoma Beccarini, abducted as a girl from Manfredonia in 1620, but this claim is disputed and unlikely.

The story of Giacoma Beccarini, (Note: The girl's first name is sometimes given as Giacoma Rosa or Giacometta, and her surname is sometimes given as Beccarini or Beccarino.) one of the girls reportedly enslaved during the sacking, has remained a part of Manfredonia's collective memory, and tradition conflates her with Zafire Hatun, a concubine of Sultan Ibrahim and the mother of Domenico Ottomano. Beccarini is not mentioned in the earliest accounts of the sack, and the oldest known versions of her story are found in the works of Cavaglieri and Sarnelli published in 1680. Cavaglieri wrote that after Beccarini was abducted, she became a sultana and gave birth to a son who later converted to Christianity and became a Dominican friar, while Sarnelli went into more detail and stated that at the time of the sack, Beccarini was a 7 or 8-year-old girl from a Sienese noble family who had been staying at the convent of the nuns of Santa Chiara. She was captured after being left behind by the nuns when they fled to the castle, and after being taken to Constantinople she was gifted to the sultan and entered the seraglio. Sarnelli wrote that after she converted to Islam and gave birth to the sultan's son, a ship they were on was captured by the Hospitallers during a naval battle in 1644 and they were taken to Malta, where her son converted and changed his name from Osman to Domenico Ottomano. Some versions of the story state that Beccarini was the orphaned daughter of a Spanish officer and that in captivity her name was changed to Bassebà. Different versions of the story contradict one another regarding whether she converted back to Christianity while in Malta or whether she remained a Muslim.

The Hospitallers' capture of Zafire and Osman and the latter's subsequent conversion are historical facts mentioned in a variety of sources, but the detail that his mother had been abducted from Manfredonia is not corroborated and is unlikely to be true. Sarnelli claimed that proof that Beccarini became sultana can be found in a letter written by Cardinal Antonio Barberini to Archbishop Orazio Annibale della Molara asking for a letter of recommendation from Giovan Tommaso Beccarini, Giacoma's brother, concerning the return of stolen relics. No such letter has been found in Manfredonia's archiepiscopal archives, and other works dealing with Domenico Ottomano's life and Hospitaller archives do not identify Zafire as Beccarini. Beccarini's age as reported by Sarnelli does not match Zafire's age as reported in other sources, (Note: Sarnelli wrote that Beccarini was 7 or 8 years old in 1620, meaning that she would have been 31 or 32 years old in 1644. In Vita del padre maestro f. Domenico di S. Tomaso dell'Ordine de' Predicatori, detto prima Sultan Osinan Ottomano, figlio d'Ibraim imperador de' Turchi (1689) by Ottaviano Bulgarini, it is stated that at the time of her enslavement by the Hospitallers in September 1644, Zafire had not yet completed "il quattro lustro della sua età" (Italian for "the fourth five-year-period of her life"), ie. she was no older than 20 years old. If Bulgarini was correct, Zafire had not yet been born at the time of the sack of Manfredonia.) and there are alternative claims that Zafire was not Italian but of Georgian or Russian origin.

A local tradition states that after Beccarini became sultana, she sent portraits of herself and of her nurse back to the nuns in her hometown. A painting of a woman wearing a turban currently held at the office of the mayor of Manfredonia is said to be Beccarini's portrait, while that of the nurse is said to have ended up in an art gallery. The portrait in the mayor's office was restored in 2010, but the claim that it depicts Beccarini has been debunked as it has been identified as a 19th-century imitation of the painting Adar by Francesco Cairo. It is possible that the real Beccarini might have been killed during the sack.
