= Zafire Hatun =

Presumed concubine of Sultan Ibrahim

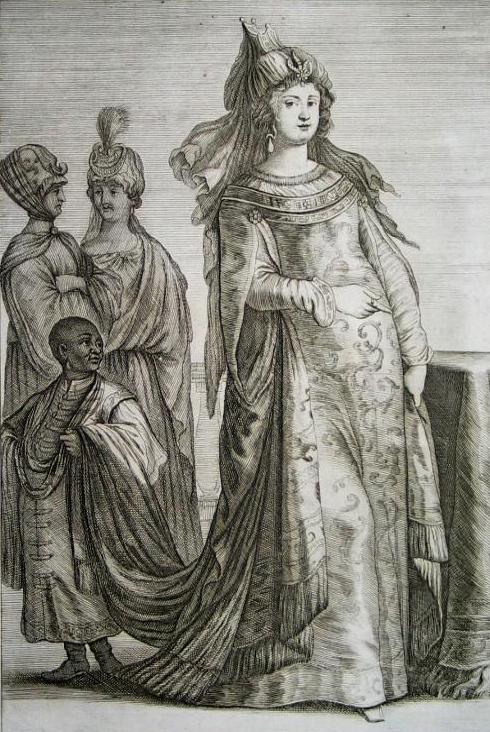
- Engraving of Zafire published in a 1707 edition of the Theatrum Europaeum
- Born: c. 1620s possibly Georgia or Russia
- Died: 6 January 1645/1646; Hospitaller Malta
- Consort of: Ibrahim
- Issue: Osman
- Religion: Sunni Islam (converted)

Zafire Hatun (c. 1620s – 1645/1646), also referred to as Zafira and by several other names, was a slave concubine in the Ottoman Imperial Harem who was a favourite of sultan Ibrahim in the early 1640s. She was presented to the sultan by chief eunuch Sünbül Ağa, and some sources describe her as the eunuch's slave or wife. When she was in the harem, she gave birth to a son named Osman, but it is unclear whether he was fathered by Ibrahim or whether Zafire had already been pregnant before entering the harem. She was also a wet nurse to future sultan Mehmed IV.

While Zafire was en route to Mecca on a pilgrimage in 1644, the ship she was on was captured by the Knights Hospitaller in a naval battle. Sünbül Ağa was killed in the engagement, and she and Osman were taken to Hospitaller Malta. Tensions from their capture led to the outbreak of the Cretan War. Zafire died of unknown causes shortly after her arrival in Malta, and Osman was subsequently raised on the island and became a Catholic friar.

== Origins and life in the harem ==
The name of Osman's mother varies in different sources, but in most cases she is referred to as Zafire Hatun or Zafira. (Note: Other spellings and variants of her name include Safira, Zaffira, Zaphira, Zarife and Zefira.) The earliest known published source about her son's life, The History of the Three Late, Famous Impostors, viz. Padre Ottomano, Mahomed Bei and Sabatai Sevi (1669) by John Evelyn the Younger, claims that she was a slave purchased by the kizlar agha from a merchant Jacobo Cesii. In L'histoire des grands visiers by François de Chassepol, she is referred to as Bassée and she is described as a Georgian slave who was presented by chief eunuch Sünbül Ağa to Ottoman sultan Ibrahim. According to de Chassepol, she became Ibrahim's favourite and gave birth to his firstborn son Osman in 1642, around the same time that another concubine named Zaime – identified as Hatice Turhan Sultan – gave birth to the future sultan Mehmed IV.

According to Vita del padre maestro f. Domenico di S. Tomaso dell'Ordine de' Predicatori, detto prima Sultan Osinan Ottomano, figlio d'Ibraim imperador de' Turchi (1689) by Ottaviano Bulgarini, she was named Zafira and she was selected to be Mehmed's wet nurse. Bulgarini also implied that she must have been born sometime after 1624. (Note: Bulgarini wrote that at the time of her enslavement by the Hospitallers in September 1644, she had not yet completed "il quattro lustro della sua età" (Italian for "the fourth five-year-period of her life"), ie. she was no older than 20 years old.) Other sources claim that she had already been pregnant when she was purchased by the eunuch, and that while Osman was born in the harem he was not fathered by Ibrahim. Zafire is sometimes said to have become the eunuch's wife, and that Ibrahim took a liking to her and became fond of the young Osman. De Chassepol claims that Zaime (Turhan Sultan) became jealous of Ibrahim's fondness for Zafire, and that on one occasion the sultan attacked Zaime and injured Mehmed after the latter came to his mother's defence. Following this incident, Sünbül Ağa left the harem with Zafire and Osman, and they did so on the pretext of making the Hajj to Mecca. The eunuch intended to retire to Egypt after the pilgrimage.

Tradition from Manfredonia in southern Italy conflates Zarife with Giacoma Beccarini, an Italian girl who was reportedly abducted and enslaved when the city was sacked by the Ottomans in August 1620. The earliest known versions of Beccarini's story are included in Il Pellegrino al Gargano (1680) by Marcello Cavaglieri and Cronologia dei Vescovi e Arcivescovi Sipontini (1680) by Pompeo Sarnelli, both of which were published six decades after the sack. According to Sarnelli, Beccarini was a 7- or 8-year-old girl from a Sienese noble family who was abducted from the convent of the nuns of Santa Chiara after the nuns left her behind when they fled to the castle during the sacking. She was taken to Constantinople and gifted to the sultan, and she later became his favourite and gave birth to his son. Sarnelli stated that she was poisoned by another woman in the seraglio before departing for Mecca after her recovery.

The conflation of Beccarini with Zafire has been disputed and is likely to be untrue. Sarnelli claimed that proof that Beccarini became sultana can be found in a letter written by Cardinal Antonio Barberini to Archbishop Orazio Annibale della Molara asking for a letter of recommendation from Giovan Tommaso Beccarini, Giacoma's brother, concerning the return of stolen relics, but no such letter has been found in Manfredonia's archiepiscopal archives. Other authors including Bulgarini do not identify Zafire as Beccarini, and the latter's age as reported by Sarnelli does not match Zafire's age reported by Bulgarini. Despite this, Beccarini's story has remained a part of Manfredonia's collective memory, and there are multiple versions of it, with some stating that she was the orphaned daughter of a Spanish officer, or that in captivity her name was changed to Bassebà. Some sources which cast doubt on Beccarini being Zafire mention that it is possible that the real Beccarini was killed during the sack.

Other sources state that Osman's mother was of Russian origin and that her real name was Sciabas, possibly a distortion of the name Slava. This version also makes the claims that she was Sünbül Ağa's slave, who was pregnant with Osman before entering the harem, and that the pilgrimage to Mecca was an excuse to leave the harem after an incident involving another concubine's jealousy and Ibrahim injuring Mehmed. Some sources describe Zafire as one of the sultan's wives or refer to her as a sultana. One source gives her name as Souleikha.

== Capture by the Hospitallers ==
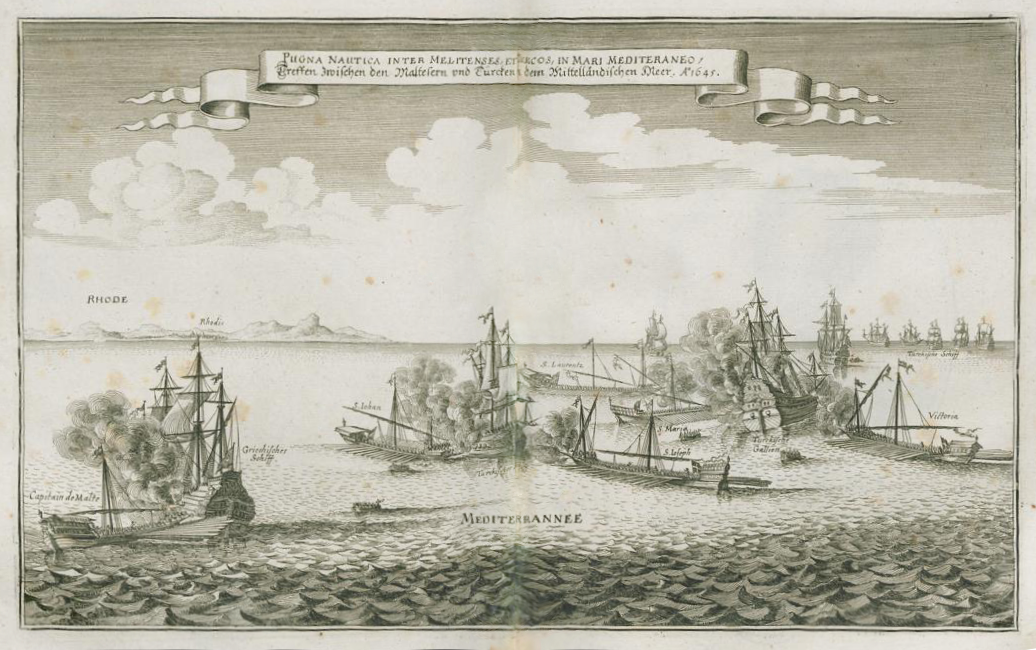
Engraving from the Theatrum Europaeum of the action of 28 September 1644, the naval battle during which Zafire was captured by the Knights Hospitaller

In 1644, Zafire and Osman accompanied by their retinue and slaves boarded a galleon heading to Alexandria en route to the Hajj. On 28 September of that year, when their convoy was off Rhodes, they encountered the galley squadron of the Knights Hospitaller, which engaged them in an hours-long naval battle in which Sünbül Ağa was killed and their ship was captured. Zafire and Osman were among 380 individuals who were taken captive. After delays due to poor weather and stops in the Venetian Kingdom of Candia, the captives were taken to Hospitaller Malta, where they arrived on 3 November 1644 or in February 1645.

Zafire's and Osman's identities were initially unknown to the Hospitallers, but after some time news spread that they were the sultan's favourite concubine and his firstborn son. Some sources suggest that Zafire might have played a role in claiming that her son had been fathered by the sultan. In the version in which Osman's mother was named Sciabas, she is said to have died on board the galleon during its capture, and when the Hospitallers inquired about the boy's identity, the captives told them that he was the sultan's son. This version claims that another slave subsequently dressed in Sciabas' clothes and posed as the boy's mother.

In Malta, Grand Master Giovanni Paolo Lascaris ordered the release of the woman and the boy, and they were accommodated in the residence of Ignazio Ribera, a wealthy merchant who spoke Turkish. (Note: Casa Ribera was located at nos. 249/250, Strada San Giorgio, Valletta. The building was destroyed by aerial bombardment during World War II.) Tensions from the capture of the vessel led to the outbreak of the decades-long Cretan War between the Ottomans and Venetians in 1645. Although the war was fought over Crete, initially there were fears of an Ottoman attack on Malta, and Zafire and Osman were moved to the tower of the Grand Master's Palace in Valletta for security reasons. They were later moved back to Ribera's residence after these fears subsided; there they continued to be served by their retinue, were given fine clothes and tapestries retrieved from the captured galleon, and were guarded by a company of soldiers and two Hospitaller knights.

Versions of the story conflating Beccarini with Zarife contradict one another regarding whether she converted back to Christianity while in Malta or whether she remained a Muslim.

== Illness and death ==
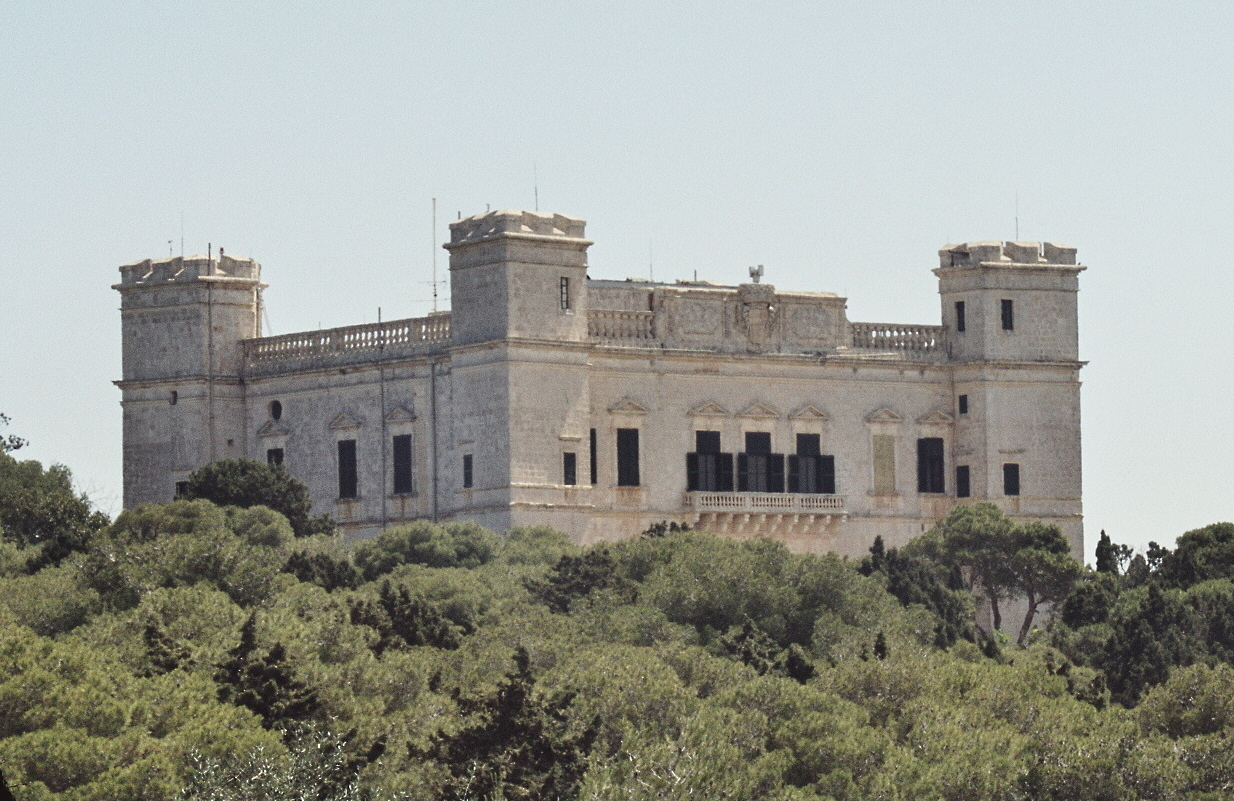
Verdala Palace, where Zafire lived before her death

A few months after her arrival in Malta, Zafire's health began to deteriorate and she was sent to Verdala Palace, the Grand Master's residence in the Boschetto woodland, for a change of air. She was accompanied by Lascaris' pages, and the Grand Master and other knights visited her on a regular basis. Most sources state that she died on 6 January 1645, but at least one source gives the date as being a year later, 6 January 1646. (Note: Her death in January 1645 would contradict sources stating that she and the other captives arrived in Malta in February 1645. However, this would not contradict other sources which give an earlier arrival date in November 1644.) The cause of her death and her burial place are unknown.

The ladies in Zafire's retinue were later ransomed, but attempts to ransom Osman were refused and the boy was raised in Malta. He was educated by the Dominican Order, and later converted to Christianity and became a Dominican friar, changing his name to Domenico di San Tommaso. After traveling throughout Catholic Europe and participating in the Cretan War, he died in Malta in 1676.

== In popular culture ==
Zafire is featured in season 2 of the Turkish historical fiction TV series Muhteşem Yüzyıl: Kösem which aired in 2017, where she is portrayed by Turkish actress Gizem Kala.
