= Action of 28 September 1644 =

1644 naval battle

Coordinates: 34.898°N 29.167°E

- Part of the Maltese Corso
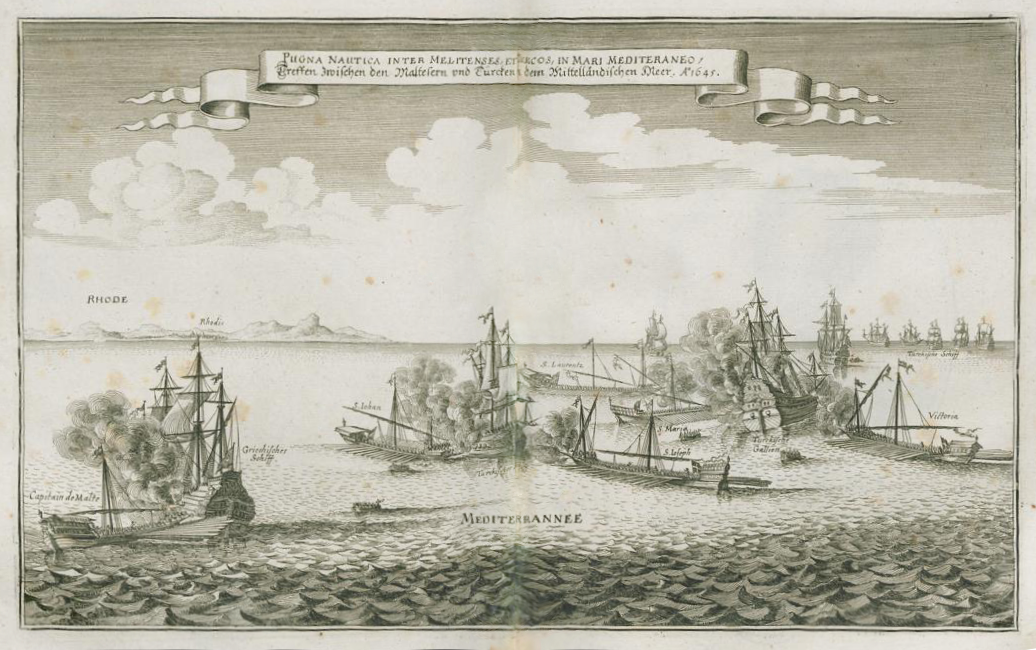
- A 1707 engraving from the Theatrum Europaeum depicting the naval battle
Date	28 September 1644
Location	Eastern Mediterranean, off Rhodes
Result	Hospitaller victory: Pretext for the Cretan War

Belligerents
(Sovereign Military Order of Malta) Hospitaller Malta	Ottoman Empire

Commanders and leaders
(Sovereign Military Order of Malta) Gabriel de Chambres Boisbaudran † (Sovereign Military Order of Malta) Nicolás Cotoner	(Ottoman Empire) Ibrahim Çelebi †

Strength
6 galleys 400+ men	1 galleon 9 pinks and saiques 600+ men and passengers on board the galleon

Casualties and losses
125 men killed 262+ men wounded	1 galleon captured 1 saique captured 1 pink sunk c. 220 killed 380 men and passengers captured

The action of 28 September 1644 was a naval battle which was fought in the Eastern Mediterranean when six Hospitaller galleys under Gabriel de Chambres Boisbaudran attacked a convoy of ten Ottoman sailing ships including a galleon commanded by Ibrahim Çelebi. Both sides suffered considerable casualties including the deaths of both commanders, and the battle ended when the Hospitallers captured the richly-laden galleon after hours of fighting.

Three hundred eighty (380) people on board the Ottoman galleon were captured by the Hospitallers, including a woman from the imperial harem and a young boy who were claimed, respectively, to be the favourite and firstborn son of sultan Ibrahim. The Hospitallers took the captives and loot to Malta but stopped at the Venetian Kingdom of Candia on the way; this was used as a pretext for the decades-long Cretan War which broke out between the Ottomans and Venice in 1645.

== Background and prelude ==
During the mid-17th century, the Knights Hospitaller who were based in Malta were in a state of perpetual religious war against Islam, and their galley squadron set out on annual corsairing expeditions during which they attacked Muslim shipping in the Mediterranean Sea. When a vessel was seized, its crew and passengers were taken as slaves and its cargo was plundered. At the time these corsair raids formed a significant part of Malta's economy.

On 16 April 1644, two Hospitaller galleys under the command of Captain General Gabriel de Chambres Boisbaudran left Malta for the Eastern Mediterranean. They returned to the island on 1 July, and Boisbaudran departed again with a squadron of six galleys on 27 August. Their search for enemy shipping was initially unsuccessful, and by late September the squadron was preparing to head back to Malta.

== Battle ==
On the morning of 28 September 1644, the Hospitaller squadron was between 70 and 130 miles (110–210 km) south of Rhodes when they encountered a convoy of ten Ottoman ships. The convoy had been heading from Constantinople to Alexandria, and it included a richly-laden sixty or eighty-gun galleon – referred to as the gran galleone, gran sultana or simply sultana in Christian sources – which carried a number of pilgrims bound for Mecca. Among these were several distinguished individuals, including Muhammad Effendi (kadi of Cairo), Sünbül Ağa (Chief Black Eunuch of the Ottoman Imperial Harem), Zafire Hatun (a woman from the harem) and her young son Osman. The other ships in the convoy were pinks and saiques.

One of the Hospitaller galleys, the Santa Maria, initially engaged the galleon on its own, and two other galleys, San Lorenzo and Vittoria, soon joined the fight and overhauled and attacked the Ottoman flagship. Meanwhile, San Giuseppe and San Giovanni captured one of the saiques and the Capitana chased a vessel which turned out to be Greek. One of the pinks was sunk. The crew on board the galleon fought fiercely, and the Hospitallers had difficulty boarding it since its decks were higher than their galleys. The San Giuseppe, San Giovanni and the Capitana also joined the fight for the galleon, and some 400 knights and men managed to board it, leading to its capture after hours of fighting. (Note: Some sources state that the battle lasted for more than five hours; others state that it lasted for seven or eight hours.)

Both sides suffered considerable casualties. Some 220 out of over 600 people on board the galleon were killed, including the Turkish commander Ibrahim Çelebi and the eunuch Sünbül Ağa; the latter reportedly died fighting bravely. The remaining 380 people on board the galleon – 350 men and 30 women – were captured by the Hospitallers. On the Hospitaller side, 9 knights and 116 soldiers and sailors were killed, while 11 knights and over 251 other men were seriously wounded. Another source reported the Maltese casualties excluding rowers as being 82 killed and 170 wounded. Boisbaudran was among those killed and the knight Nicolás Cotoner, captain of the San Lorenzo, took over command following his death. The captain of the Santa Maria was also killed.

=== Ships involved ===
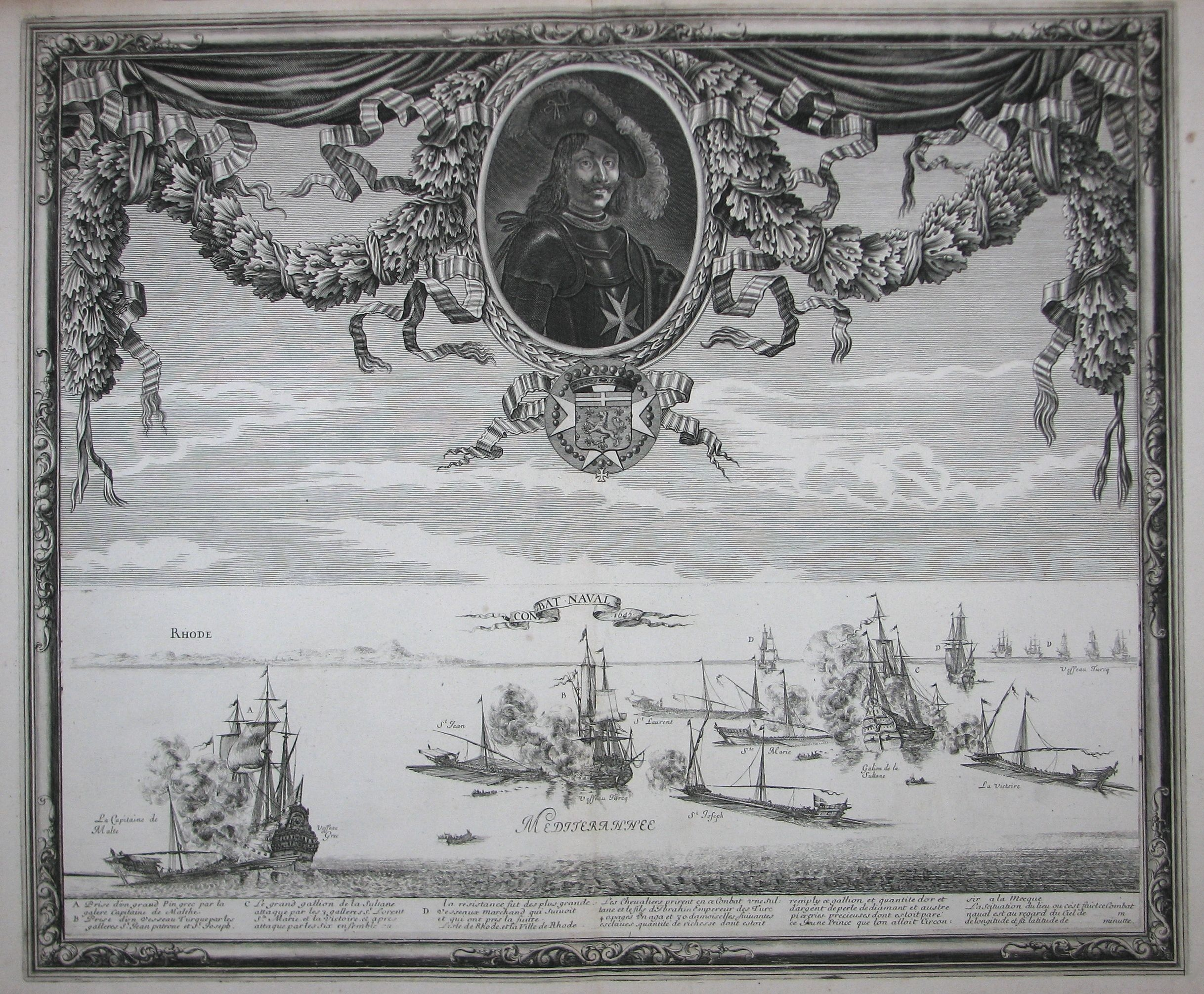
A portrait of Boisbaudran, with the named ships at the battle

==== Knights Hospitaller ====
- Capitana – galley, commanded by Boisbaudran
- San Lorenzo – galley, commanded by Cotoner
- Santa Maria – galley
- Vittoria – galley
- San Giuseppe – galley
- San Giovanni – galley

==== Ottoman Empire ====
- 1 galleon which was captured and later wrecked
- 1 pink which was sunk
- 1 saique which was captured
- 7 other pinks and saiques which survived the battle

== Aftermath ==
=== Voyage to Malta ===
The San Lorenzo attempted to tow the captured galleon but was unable to do so because of poor weather. After the galleon was emptied of its cargo, it was jury rigged in an attempt to take it to Malta, but stormy weather forced the ship to take shelter at Calalimione on Crete (then a possession of the Republic of Venice as the Kingdom of Candia), at the Christiani Islands and at Porto Quaglio. At the unguarded harbour of Calalimione, the galleys took on water and supplies and landed around 50 Greek men (who had been hired as sailors on the galleon) along with some horses. The Ottomans claimed that the Hospitallers stayed on Crete for 20 days, and during this time they reportedly sold some of the loot and some of the Turkish crewmen managed to escape.

The Hospitaller squadron attempted to anchor at Castel Selino near Sfacchia but was forbidden to do so by the Venetian authorities. They then sailed to the Ionian Islands where they were prevented from anchoring at Cerigo. Instead they took refuge at Cephalonia, but stormy weather forced them to abandon the galleon which ended up wrecked on the Calabrian coast. The galleys returned to Malta on 3 November 1644 or in February 1645.

The galleon was the largest ship the Hospitallers had ever captured, and it had been carrying the movable treasure of Sünbül Ağa, who had intended to retire to Egypt after his Hajj. The ship's cargo – which included jewels, gold and silver objects, and tapestries – had a value of 200,000 scudi and Hospitaller historian Bartolomeo dal Pozzo claimed that the loot enriched half of Malta.

=== Outbreak of the Cretan War ===
Venice was officially a neutral party in the perpetual war between the Hospitallers and the Ottomans, and the latter deemed the Hospitallers' stops in Venetian territories just after they had plundered an Ottoman ship as a violation of this neutrality. Although the landings had been expressly forbidden by the Signoria of Venice and some Venetian commanders had turned the Hospitallers away, the Venetians had not intervened when the Hospitallers had landed at Kalismene.

The sultan was reportedly enraged at the capture of the galleon and of Osman, and he is said to have vowed to destroy Hospitaller Malta. By late 1644, a fleet was being prepared in Constantinople and there were rumours that its purpose was to attack the Hospitallers, although the Venetians were aware that Crete was also a possible target. For the Ottomans, Crete was a richer and more desirable prize than Malta, and the Hospitallers' stops on the island gave them a pretext to attack the Republic.

When the Ottoman fleet left the Dardanelles on 30 April 1645, it was still generally believed that they were about to attack Malta, so much so that Venetian authorities received the fleet hospitably on Tinos. Their intentions were revealed shortly afterwards when they attacked Crete, beginning a protracted war which lasted until 1669 and which culminated in the capture of the island by the Ottomans. The Hospitallers fought on the Venetian side during the war.

=== Fate of captives ===
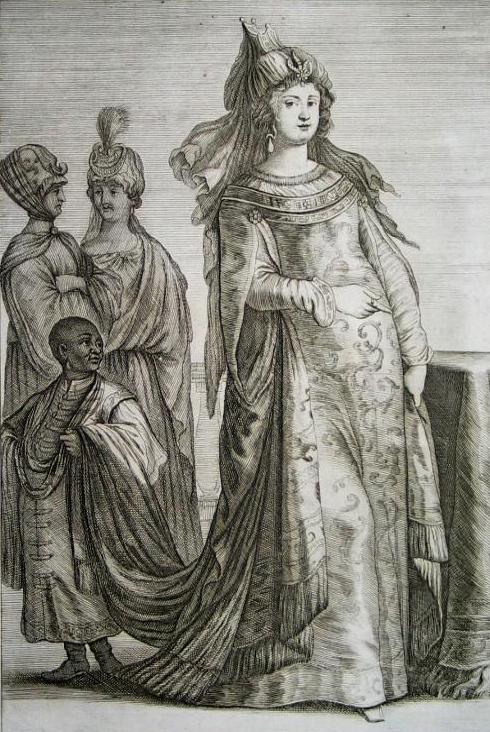
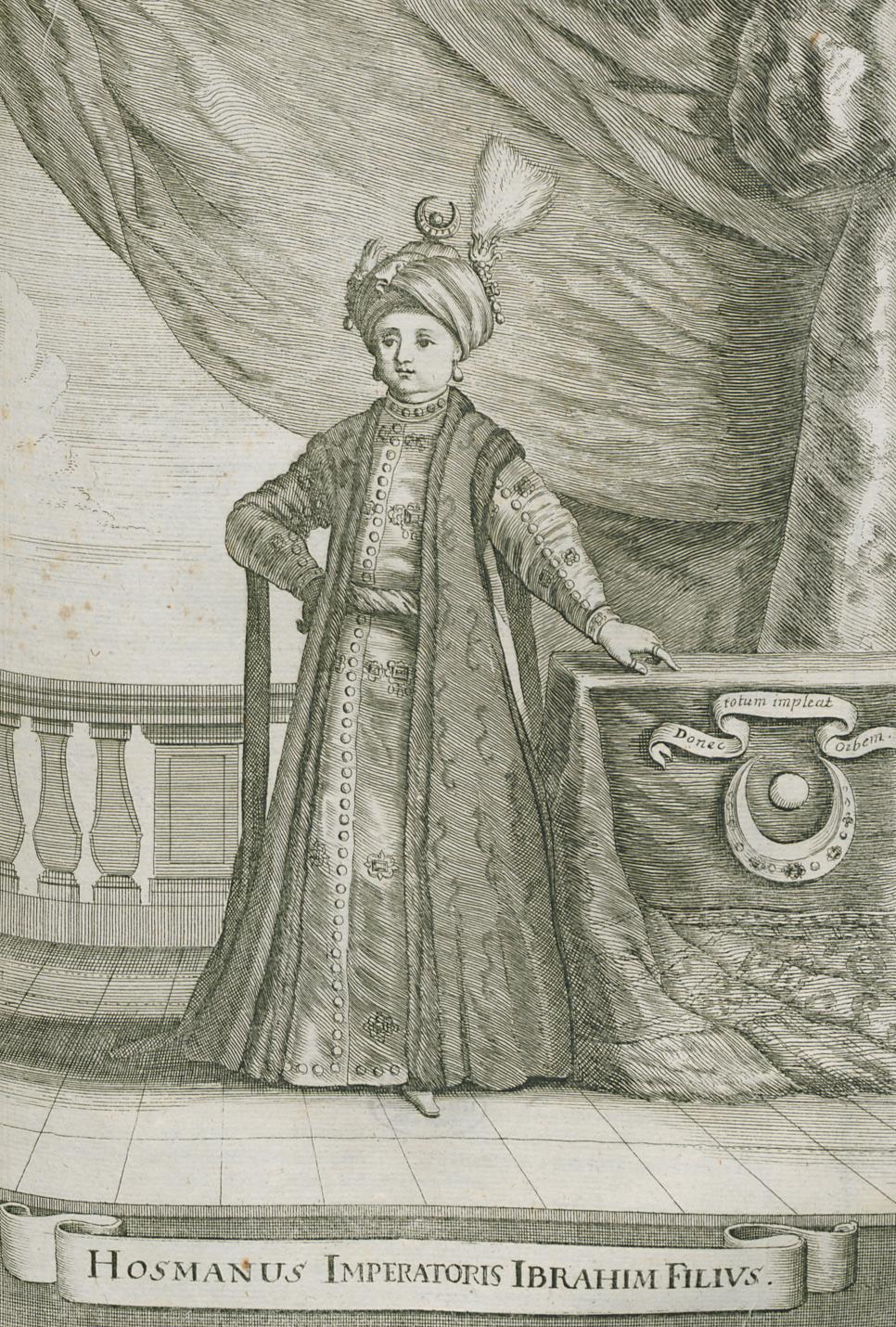
Zafire and Osman as depicted in engravings published in a 1707 edition of the Theatrum Europaeum

Apart from the 50 Greek sailors who were released and the Turkish crewmembers who escaped while on Crete, the remaining captives from the galleon were taken to Malta as slaves. Some time after their arrival, news spread that Zafire and Osman were the favourite and firstborn son of Ottoman sultan Ibrahim, and Grand Master Giovanni Paolo Lascaris ordered their release. They were accommodated along with their retinue at a merchant's residence and at the tower of the Grand Master's Palace in Valletta, where they were kept under guard. Zafire's health deteriorated soon afterwards, and she died shortly after being sent to Verdala Palace.

The ladies in Zafire's retinue and the kadi Muhammad Effendi were eventually ransomed and freed; the latter later became a mufti. Attempts to ransom Osman were refused, and he was raised on Malta and was educated by the Dominican Order. He later converted to Catholicism and became a Dominican friar, changing his name to Domenico di San Tommaso. After traveling throughout Catholic Europe and participating in the Cretan War, he died in Malta in 1676.
