= Corto Maltese (disambiguation) =

Corto Maltese is a series of adventure comics created in 1967 by Hugo Pratt.

Corto Maltese may also refer to:

- Corto Maltese (DC Comics), a fictional country featured in DC Comics books
- "Corto Maltese" (Arrow episode), an episode of Arrow

== See also ==
- Maltese Corso, a 1530–1798 naval operation by Knights Hospitaller
