= The Triumph of Judith with Stories from the Old Testament =

1703–1704 fresco paintings on the ceiling of the Tesoro Nuovo chapel

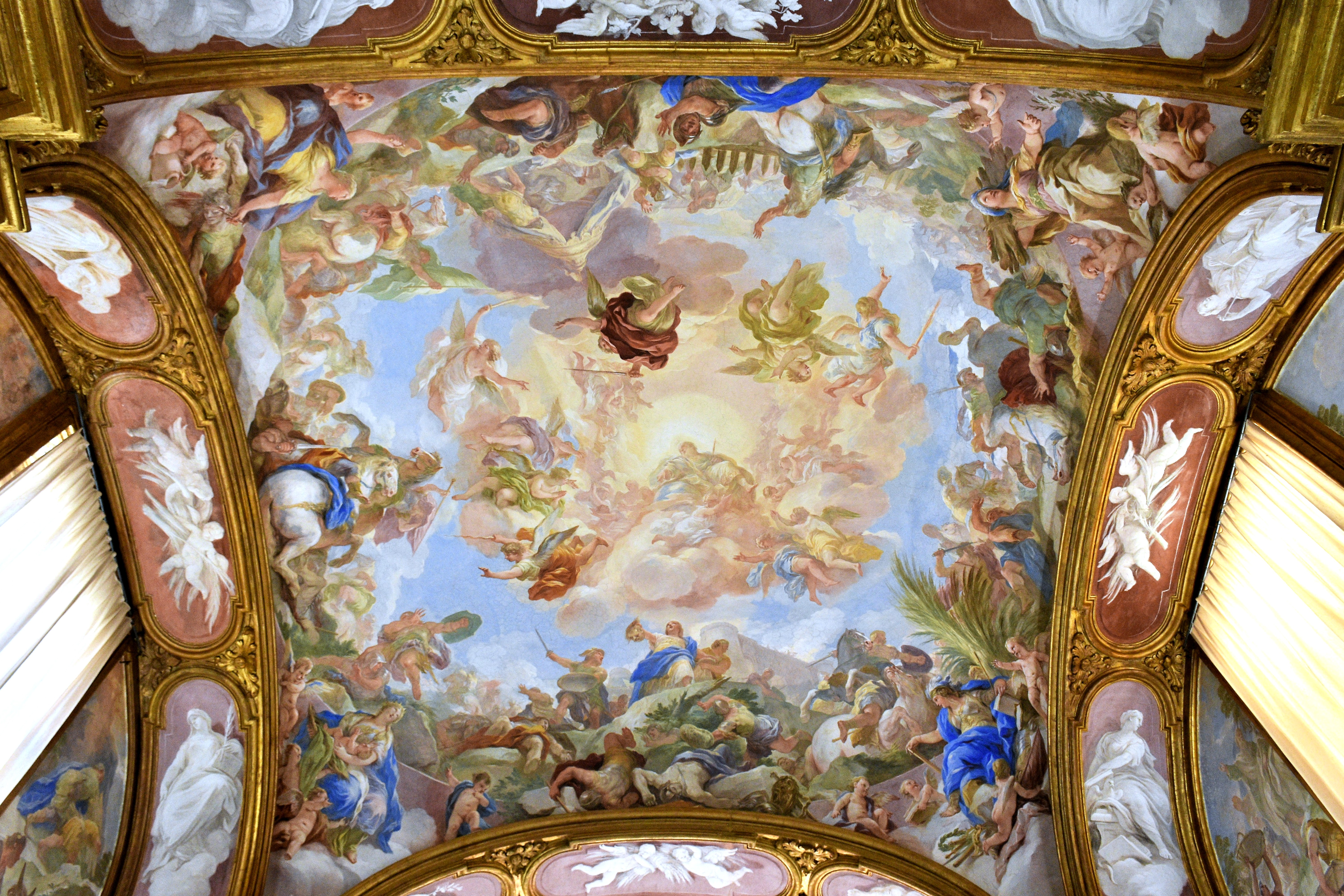

The Triumph of Judith or The Triumph of Judith with Stories from the Old Testament is a 1703-1704 cycle of fresco paintings on the ceiling of the Tesoro Nuovo chapel in certosa di San Martino in Naples. It is considered one of his masterworks and one of the greatest painted expressions of Italian Baroque art. Several sketches for the cycle, especially for The Triumph of Judith, survive in various museums.

== History ==
Following the restoration of the Carthusian complex at the end of the 17th century, the fathers awaited the right moment to moot the commission for a cycle of frescoes. It seems that no painter could convince them with their design - Pompeo Sarnelli wrote in 1697 "the chapel must be painted, but the Fathers are perplexed as to which artist to entrust the burden too; there is no brush today that can be included among the paintings of the said Church". The opportunity finally came in 1702 when Luca Giordano returned to Naples after his long stay in Spain.

The commission was agreed in 1703, when the painter was about seventy years old, for 2,000 ducats. It agreed that he would paint frescoes on Judith's triumph on the dome of the Tesoro chapel, with vault lunettes with scenes from the Old Testament.

He completed the cycle a year later in April 1704. It was his last work and as soon as it was complete it was highly praised by local guides and painters, with some of the latter modelling their own works on it.

== Analysis ==
The cycle based on various scenes arranged on the chapel's 'scodella' or shallow dome cupola and on the upper parts of the side walls beside the windows. The cupola was originally square in form but Giordano replanned it in a cylindrical form. The stories are told in a figurative continuity with characters along all four sides. On the two sides facing each other are scenes from Judith's triumph, with the heroine triumphantly displaying Holofornes' severed head to her people and in the background a handmaid standing behind her with an open bag for the head and the headless body of the Assyrian general inside his tent. On the two other sides are scenes of the Israelites massacaring the Amalekites, whilst the centre of the dome has a group of angels surrounding God. Nei quattro angoli sono raffigurate altre eroine del Vecchio Testamento: Giaele che conficca un picchetto nella tempia di Sisara, la Figlia del Faraone con Mosé bambino, Ester e la Figlia di Jefte. In the four corners are the Old Testament women Jael (driving a tent peg into Sisera's temple), Pharaoh's daughter (with the infant Moses), Esther and Jephthah's daughter.

In the lunette above the high altar is a fresco of Moses raising the brazen serpent. Beside the right hand windows are the fall of the manna and Moses striking the rock to produce water and beside the left hand windows is Nebuchadnezzar's furnace from the Book of Daniel and Abraham and Isaac climbing the mountain from the Book of Genesis. Above the entrance door are Elijah's sacrifice on Mount Carmel, whilst monochrome works showing the cardinal virtues and angels are painted in the oblong spaces of the under-arches punctuating the vault.

The intense and luminous colours and the numerous sfumato-style figures with their animated actions are typical of the painter's late style, when he moved beyond a realism influenced by Caravaggio and Juan de Ribera to be more influenced by Venetian painters, especially the 'fairytale' or 'fiabesca' style of Pietro da Cortona. He had previously produced a cycle around a shallow cupola at the Hall of Mirrors in the palazzo Medici Riccardi then at the Escorial in Madrid, where he also showed the event unfolding through a narrative sequence at the borders of the fresco and had a cloud of angels around God in the central space. The solutions he used for these three spaces were the first large-scale examples of Rococo, a style that would dominate European art for the rest of the century.

The work has been seen as the "quintessence" of Giordano's art: De Dominici asserted that in it he had "created a marvel and [...] surpassed all his frescoed works", Francesco Solimena praised the master's work by declaring that "[...] the fury, the fire, and the knowledge with which that battle was painted could not be imitated by any great painter, since it seemed painted all in one breath, and with a single stroke of the brush", De Matteis considered it Giordano's "best work" and Lanzi stated "any other fresco work of his is rated lower than that of the Certosa Treasury".

== Description ==
=== Triumph of Judith ===
Image	Title	Position
	Judith with the Head of Holofernes	Bottom cornice of the cupola
	Battle between the Israelites and the Assyrians	Left cornice of the cupola
	Holofernes Beheaded	Top cornice of the cupola
	Battle between the Israelites and the Assyrians	Right cornice of the cupola
	God Guiding the Guardian Angels	Centre of the cupola
	Jephtha's Daughter	Bottom right corner of the cupola
	Jael Driving a Tent-Peg through Sisera's Temple	Top left corner of the cupola
	Pharaoh's Daughter with Moses as a Baby	Bottom left corner of the cupola
	Esther	Top right corner of the cupola

=== Stories from the Old Testament ===
Image	Title	Position
	Nebuchadnezzar's Furnace	Section of the left window
	Abraham and Isaac Climbing the Mountain	Section of the left window
	The Brazen Serpent	Front lunette
	The Manna Falls	Segment of the right window
	Moses Striking Water from the Rock	Segment of the right window
	Elijah's Sacrifice on Mount Carmel	Entrance lunette
