= Domenico Ottomano =

Ottoman Catholic friar (1642–1676)

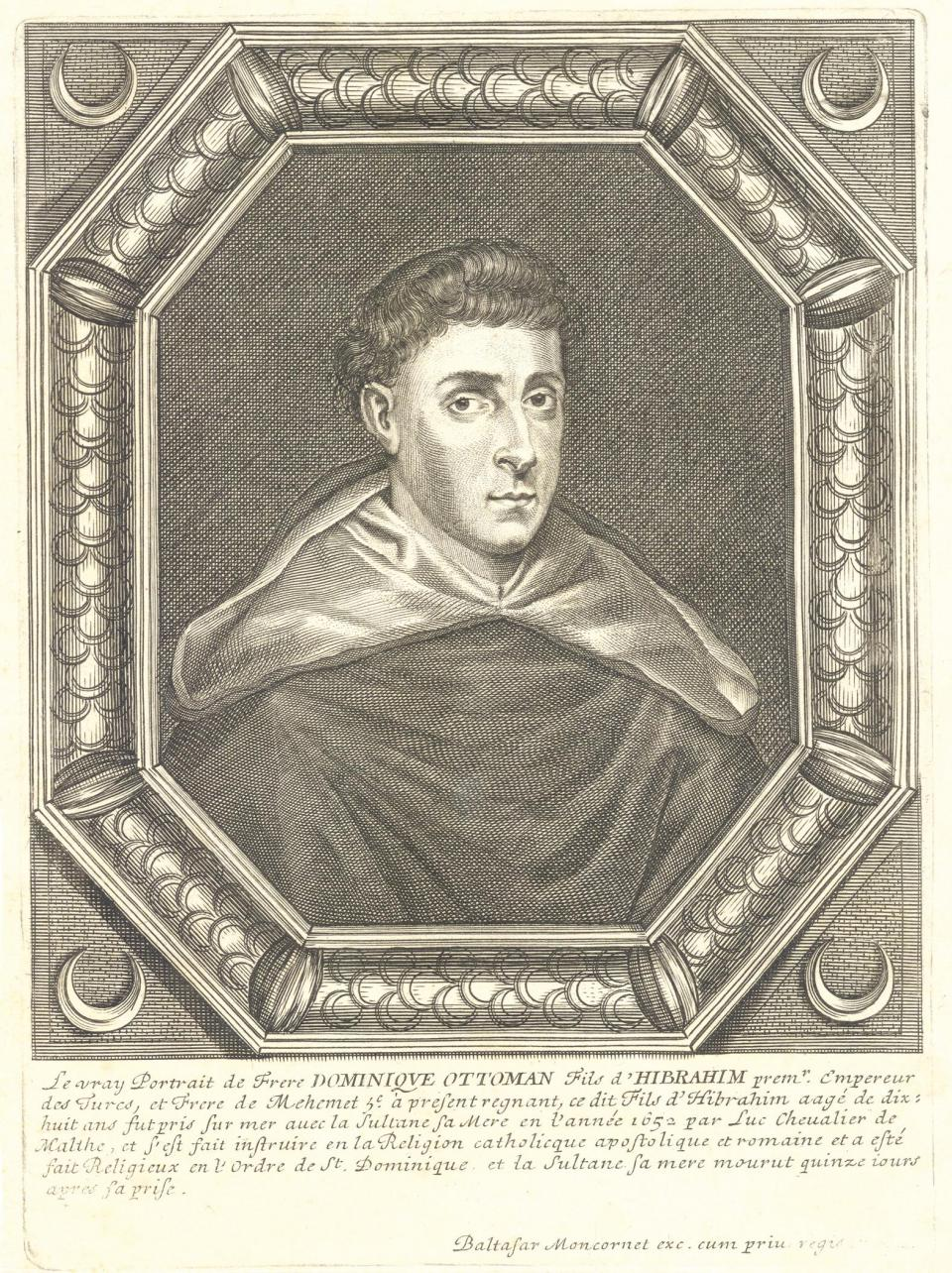
- Born: Osman; 2 January 1642; Constantinople, Ottoman Empire
- Died: 25 October 1676 (aged 34); Senglea, Hospitaller Malta
- Burial place: Basilica of St Dominic, Valletta, Malta
- Parents: Ibrahim (alleged; disputed) (father); Zafire Hatun (mother)

Domenico di San Tommaso (2 January 1642 – 25 October 1676), born Osman, also known as Domenico Ottomano or Padre Ottomano, was an Ottoman friar of the Dominican Order who was claimed to be the firstborn son of sultan Ibrahim. He was the son of Zafire Hatun, a woman in the Ottoman Imperial Harem, and whether or not he was actually fathered by Ibrahim remains unclear. During his early childhood, he and his mother were captured and taken to Hospitaller Malta, where he was raised, converted to Christianity and joined the Dominicans. In his adulthood, he lived in the Papal States and France and he travelled to other Italian states, where he was received as a prince by political and religious leaders despite his apparent desire to lead a modest monastic life.

During the late stages of the Cretan War – which had commenced as a result of his capture by the Hospitallers – Ottomano was at the centre of an ambitious political scheme devised in Venice and Rome which sought to use him as a pretender to the Ottoman throne in a bid to change the outcome of the Siege of Candia and to instigate a wider revolt with the goal of replacing the Ottoman Empire with a Christian empire. In 1668–1669, he traveled to Candia and Zante in an attempt to implement this scheme, but failed to secure any meaningful support and the plan fell apart. He lived the rest of his life in Rome and Malta, where he died at the age of 34.

== Identity, parentage, and early life ==
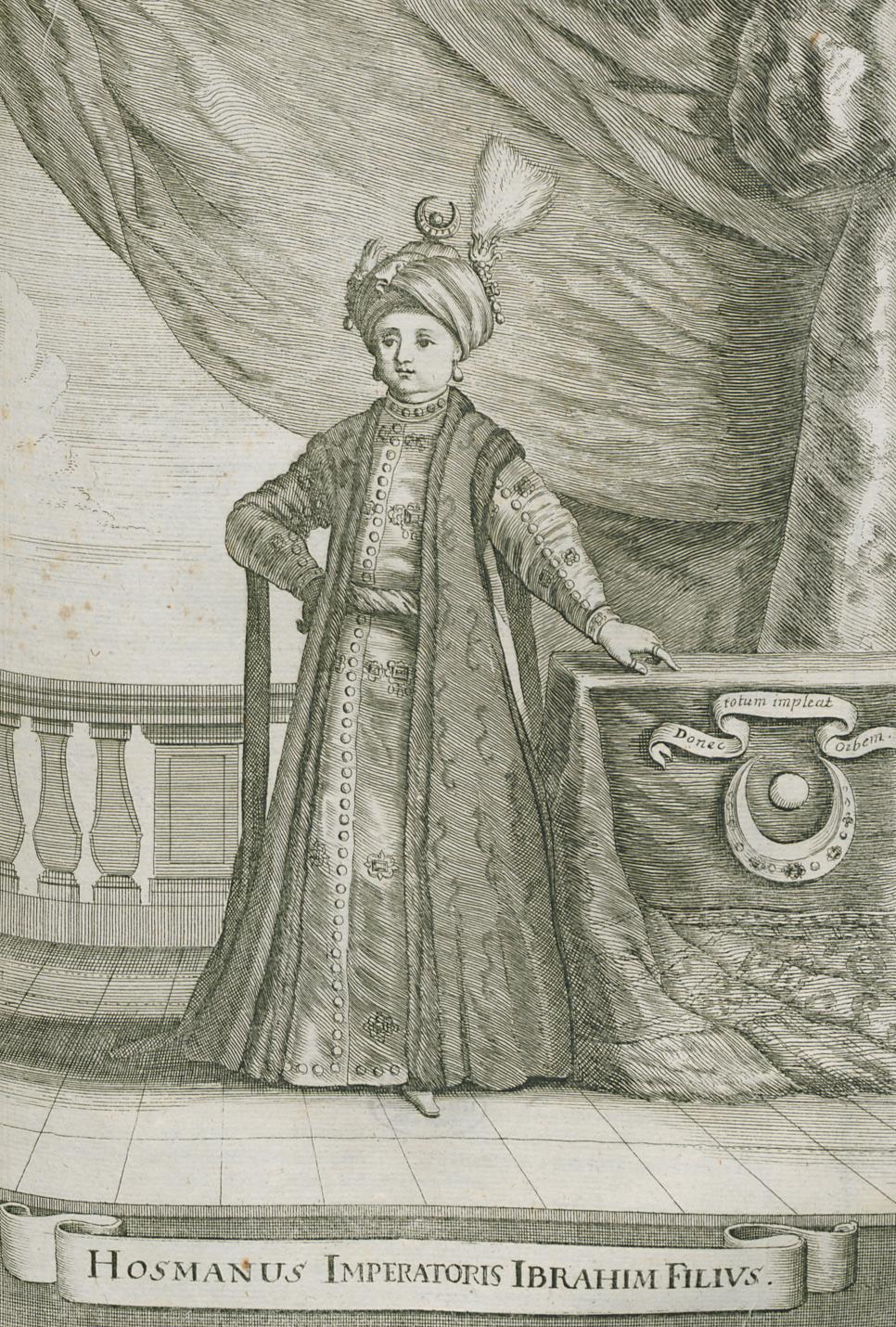
Osman as depicted in an engraving published in a 1707 edition of the Theatrum Europaeum.

Osman was born on 2 January 1642 in Constantinople to Zafire Hatun, a woman in the Ottoman Imperial Harem. Some sources state that his full name was Osman Ibrahim. Osman's mother was possibly of Georgian or Russian origin and she seems to have been presented to Ottoman sultan Ibrahim after having been purchased as a slave by chief eunuch Sünbül Ağa. Other sources claim that Zafire was of Italian origin, that her real name was Giacoma Beccarini, and that she had been abducted and enslaved during the sack of Manfredonia in 1620, although this version is regarded as unlikely to be true. Details of Osman's early life vary across sources, and while it has been claimed that Zafire was Ibrahim's favourite and that Osman was the sultan's firstborn son, whether or not this was actually the case has been disputed and remains unclear.

In François de Chassepol's L'histoire des grands visiers his mother's name is given as Bassée and it is claimed that Osman was fathered by Ibrahim, while The History of the Three Late, Famous Impostors, viz. Padre Ottomano, Mahomed Bei and Sabatai Sevi (1669) by John Evelyn the Younger disputes this. Some sources claim that Zafire had been pregnant with Osman before she had been purchased by the eunuch, and that Ibrahim became fond of the young Osman after he took a liking to his mother when she became a wet nurse to future sultan Mehmed IV. After an incident in which Mehmed was injured by Ibrahim, in 1644 Sünbül Ağa left the harem with Zafire and Osman on the pretext of performing the Hajj pilgrimage to Mecca. The eunuch – who is described as Zafire's husband in some sources – intended to retire to Egypt after the pilgrimage. Some sources claim that they intended to circumcise Osman while in Mecca.

== Capture by the Hospitallers and childhood in Malta ==
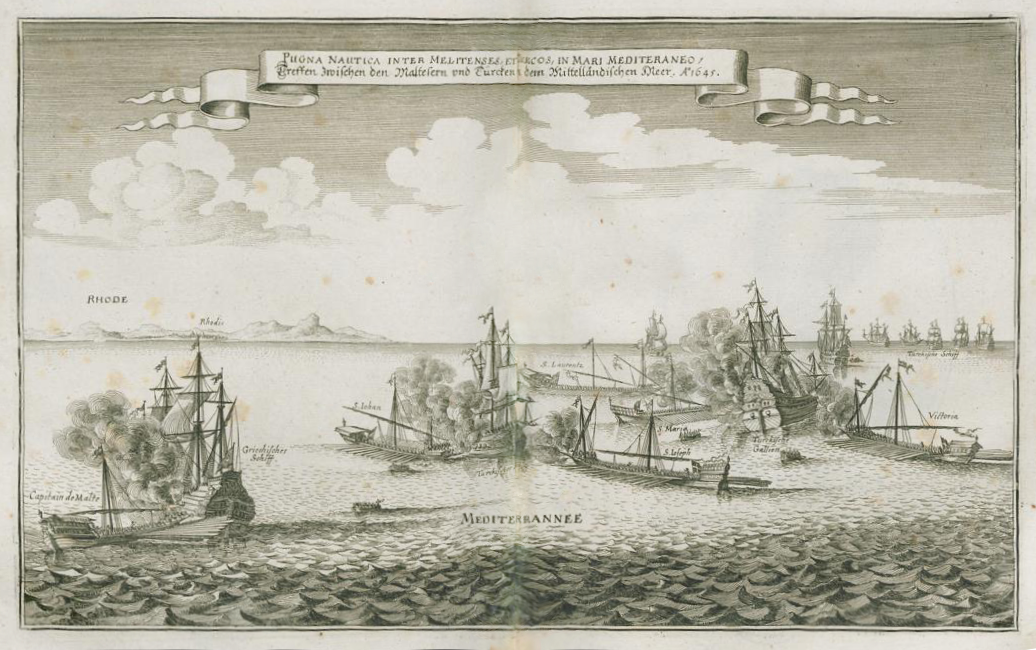
Engraving from the Theatrum Europaeum of the action of 28 September 1644, the naval battle during which Osman was captured by the Knights Hospitaller

On 28 September 1644, while Osman, his mother, Sünbül Ağa and their retinue and slaves were en route to Alexandria on their way to the Hajj, their galleon was engaged by the galley squadron of the Knights Hospitaller in an hours-long naval battle off Rhodes during which the eunuch was among those killed. The Hospitallers captured their ship and Osman and Zafire were among 380 individuals who were taken captive. After stops at the Venetian Kingdom of Candia, they were taken to Hospitaller Malta and Zafire's and Osman's identities were initially unknown to the Hospitallers, but some time later news spread that they were the sultan's favourite concubine and his firstborn son. Some sources suggest that Zafire might have played a role in claiming that her son had been fathered by the sultan, while others state that the claim was first made by those taken captive on the galleon, and that Osman's mother had actually died when the ship was captured while another slave dressed in her clothes and posed as her.

In Malta, Grand Master Giovanni Paolo Lascaris ordered their release and they were accommodated in the residence of Ignazio Ribera, a wealthy merchant who spoke Turkish. (Note: Casa Ribera was located at nos. 249/250, Strada San Giorgio, Valletta. The building was destroyed by aerial bombardment during World War II.) Tensions from the capture of the vessel led to the outbreak of the decades-long Cretan War between the Ottomans and Venetians in 1645. Although the war was fought over Crete, during its early stages there were fears of an Ottoman attack on Malta, and Osman and Zafire were moved to the tower of the Grand Master's Palace in Valletta for security reasons. They were later moved back to Ribera's residence after these fears subsided; there they continued to be served by their retinue, were given fine clothes and tapestries retrieved from the captured galleon, and were guarded by a company of soldiers and two Hospitaller knights. Zafire's health deteriorated and she died shortly after their arrival in Malta, and the Ottomans reportedly made attempts to ransom Osman but these were refused. Some sources state that the Hospitallers made the unreasonable demand of the island of Rhodes – which they had previously controlled until 1522 – as ransom for Osman.

On one occasion when Osman was invited to dine with Lascaris, the boy refused to eat unless he was served food on golden plates, and the Grand Master complied with these wishes. Lascaris is said to have taken a personal interest in his upbringing and education, and after the ladies who had accompanied him and Zafire were ransomed, on 17 November 1654 he was sent to the priory of the Dominican Order in Valletta and two friars were assigned to educate him. The Hospitaller knight Raimondo d'Alvito was also assigned as his tutor.

== Conversion and life as a friar ==
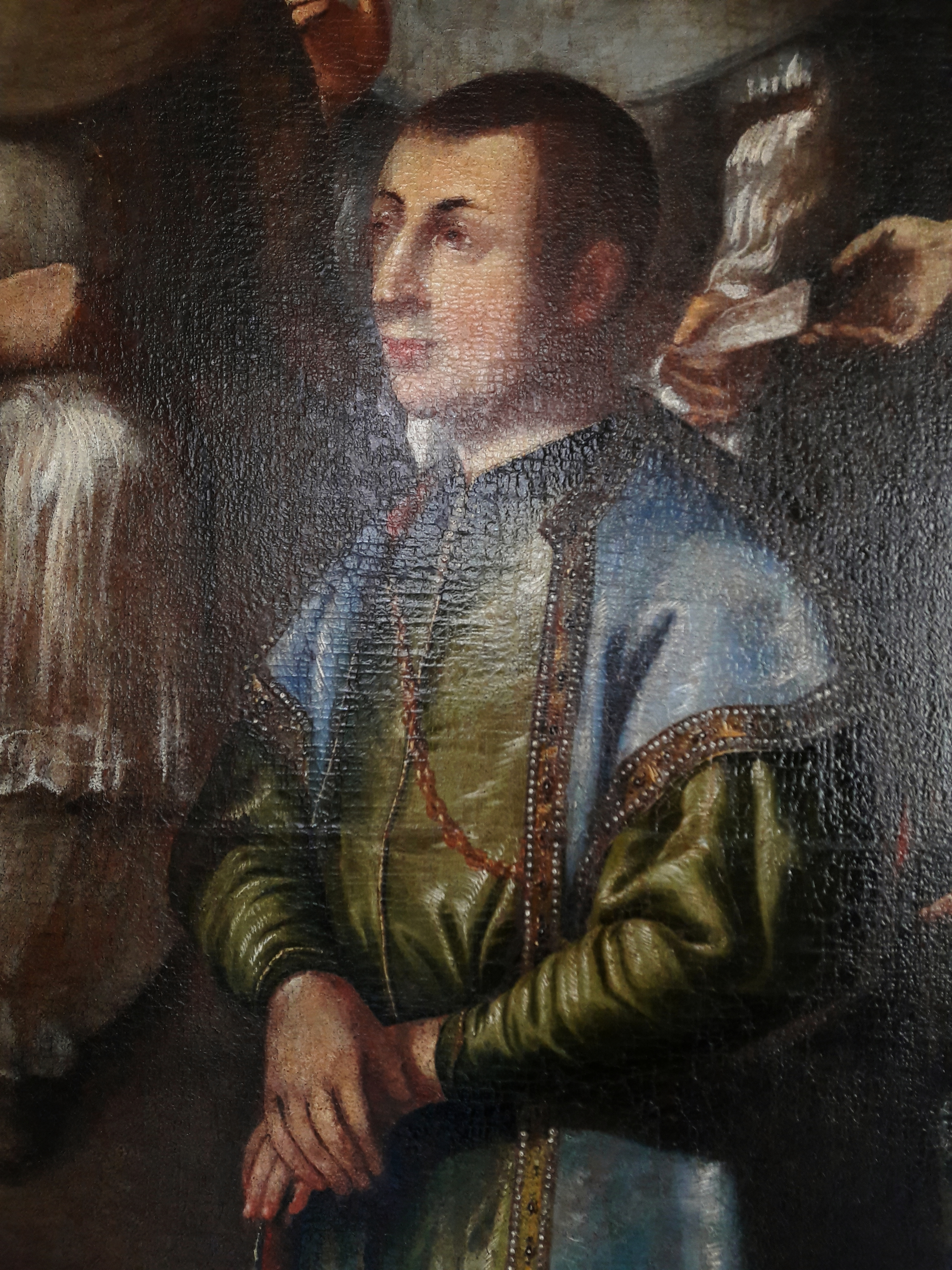
Domenico Ottomano as depicted in the anonymous painting Conversion of the Sultan's son, Dominican monastery, Lublin

Osman had been raised as a Muslim and he initially did not renounce his faith, but by early 1656 he decided to convert to Christianity. He was baptised on 23 February 1656, adopting the Christian name Domenico di San Tommaso, and he received confirmation on 4 August 1658. He decided to join the Dominicans, and after a period of novitiate he received the habit of the order on 30 October 1658 at the Church of Our Lady of the Grotto in Rabat. He took his vows on 21 October 1659.

In March 1660, he left Malta and traveled to Naples and later to Rome to further his education. He was received by Pope Alexander VII and continued his studies at the Minerva college; his presence elicited popular curiosity and he became known as Padre Ottomano (Ottoman Father). Sources describe his personality as being shy, modest and unassuming, and he appears to have wanted to lead a reclusive monastic lifestyle rather than claim any royal rights of succession for himself. He rarely made public appearances, but he traveled throughout Italy, visiting Florence, Ferrara, Bologna, Modena, Parma, Milan and Turin. In the process he met many prominent religious and political leaders, and he was widely believed to be sultan Ibrahim's son in the Catholic parts of Europe. While in Turin in August 1664, he met and befriended Baldassare Diego Loyola, a Moroccan prince who had converted from Islam to Christianity after being captured by the Hospitallers.

On 27 January 1665, Ottomano went to Paris where he was received by King Louis XIV. He remained in the city for a couple of years, living at the Convent of the Annunciation. Around this time, Maurizio Paleologo, vicar general of the Greek Orthodox Church of Alexandria, and Gregory Basil, son of Prince Rákoczi of Wallachia, wrote to Ottomano and attempted to convince him to become politically active by claiming that Ottoman Christians were ready to rise up and acclaim him as their king. According to some sources, the French monarch also corresponded with Ottoman Grand Vizier Köprülüzade Fazıl Ahmed Pasha in an unsuccessful attempt to install him on the Ottoman throne.

== Pretender in Candia and Zante ==
The war over Crete which had begun after Ottomano's capture was still ongoing two decades later, and the conflict escalated when the Grand Vizier personally led an army to besiege the city of Candia. In 1666–1667, representatives of the French, Papal and Venetian governments and the Dominican Order negotiated between themselves on how to make use of Ottomano as a political tool, although he does not seem to have been actively involved in the early stages of these plans. The Venetians wanted to send him personally on a relief campaign to Candia, and on 27 July 1667 he and his assistant Ignozzi di Terracusa left Paris for Venice at the urging of Venetian ambassador Marcantonio Giustinian. Upon his arrival in Venice, he was received by Doge Domenico II Contarini.

In January 1668, Ottomano went to Rome where he met newly-elected Pope Clement IX and several cardinals and it was decided that he would go to Candia on board a galley of the Papal Navy. An ambitious and somewhat naïve scheme was formulated in which it was hoped that Ottomano's presence would change the outcome of the siege of Candia, instigate a wider Greek and Turkish revolt, destabilise the Ottoman Empire and replace it with a Christian empire in the Eastern Mediterranean. This scheme went against the interests of France and of Protestant European countries, and the claim that Domenico was an impostor rather than sultan Ibrahim's son – which first appeared in John Evelyn's book published in London – appears to have been politically motivated to discredit this scheme. He later left Rome for Civitavecchia, where boarded the Papal galley S. Pietro which set sail for Naples on 19 May 1668. The Papal squadron rendezvoused with the Hospitaller squadron at Messina on 5 June, and the joint fleet reached Corfu on 15 June. After ten days in Corfu, they were joined by some Venetian ships and they sailed for Candia, where they landed on 19 July.

The Venetians sent letters to the Grand Vizier and to other Ottoman officers informing them of Ottomano's arrival and of his identity as the elder brother of then-reigning sultan Mehmed IV, thus making him the rightful ruler of the Ottoman Empire. Turkish-language leaflets were prepared and Venetian commander Francesco Morosini ordered his men to attach these to arrows and shoot them at the Ottoman camps, in an attempt to compel soldiers to desert and join their side. These efforts were unsuccessful; it is not known whether the Grand Vizier even opened the letter which was sent to him, and it is likely that the Ottomans made efforts to prevent common soldiers from learning this information.

The Christians then changed their strategy and attempted to use Ottomano to provoke an insurrection in the Morea and the southern Balkans in order to divert the Ottomans' attention from Candia. He and Terracusa arrived in Zante by late November 1668, and in the following months he took a more active role and attempted to establish contacts with the Maniots and other Balkan representatives in order to instigate a rebellion. He also sent letters to the Roman Curia, the Venetian Senate, to Hospitaller Grand Master Nicolás Cotoner and to other leaders requesting military support. In March 1669, he appealed to Venetian officer and diplomat Annibale Porrone, and the following May the Venetian Senate discussed the possibility of such an uprising and decided not to support it due to wider geopolitical concerns.

Hospitaller knight Carlo della Lengueglia and Apostolic Nuncio Lorenzo Trotti supported Ottomano's proposal and attempted to secure support from Venice and Rome, but the Venetians declined support again in June while the Papacy stated in August that the plans had no possibility of success. Ottomano left Zante by September and on 10 October he returned to Venice where he stayed at Lengueglia's residence; by that point Candia had fallen to the Ottomans. His efforts to secure financial support from Venice were unsuccessful, and he decided to return to Rome via Ancona.

== Later life and death ==
The ship which he boarded from Venice to Ancona was shipwrecked and he ended up in Ragusa before making his way to Ravenna, from where he visited the Sanctuary of Our Lady of Loreto. He returned to Rome on the same day that Clement IX died, and at this point he abandoned his political aspirations and became a priest. He celebrated his first Mass at the Basilica of Saint Paul Outside the Walls and for the next five years he lived a reclusive life in Rome, where he studied the Summa Theologica by Thomas Aquinas.

He wanted to become a missionary and made a request to his superiors to be sent 'anywhere in the world', with a preference for Armenia. Instead, on 4 July 1675 he was appointed as Prior of the Porto Salvo Church in Valletta and vicar general of the Dominicans in Malta. Accompanied by Terracusa, he returned to Malta via Naples and Sicily on 28 March 1676; at the time of their arrival, the island was in the midst of the deadliest plague epidemic in its history. He made efforts to assist those stricken by the disease, but he fell ill himself shortly afterwards. Grand Master Cotoner accommodated him in a palace in Senglea under the care of his own personal doctor, but he died on 25 October 1676 at the age of 34. He was given an elaborate funeral at the Porto Salvo church, where he was also buried.
