= Attack on Sousse (1619) =

- Part of the Spanish–Ottoman wars and Ottoman–Habsburg wars
Date	19 August 1619
Location	Sousse, Tunisia
Result	Ottoman-Tunisian victory

Belligerents
Spanish Empire: Kingdom of Naples; Kingdom of Sicily; Grand Duchy of Tuscany (Sovereign Military Order of Malta) Hospitaller Malta; Papal States	Ottoman Empire: Tunisia

Commanders and leaders
Prince Filiberto of Savoy	Unknown

Strength
56 galleys 6,000 men	Unknown

Casualties and losses
150 killed Unknown wounded	Unknown

The attack on Sousse was launched by a joint Christian armada in 1619 against the Tunisian city of Sousse. The attack ended in Fiasco for the Christians.

== Background ==
In 1619, prince Filiberto of Savoy assumed command of the Spanish navy. He heard reports of a large Ottoman navy consisting of 68 ships in the Levant. The prince decided to do something against this and launched an attack against the Tunisian city of Soussa to take it as a base. A city that was densely populated by Moriscos of Spain. The prince mustered up an armada of 56 galleys, consisting of 17 from Naples, 7 from Sicily, 14 from Genoa, 6 from Tuscany, 5 from Malta, 4 from Papal states, and 3 from Spain. The armada had a force of 6,000 men.

== Attack ==
On August 12, the armada set sail from Messina to Malta. The armada left Malta on the 15th and reached Soussa at the night of the 18th. The prince had the Maltese, Tuscans, and Sicilians guide him to Soussa. The next day before dawn, they arrived at Soussa and began disembarking; however, the Tunisians were alerted, and they began bombarding the Christians with lots of artillery and fires. The Christians arrived at the main gate under heavy fire and began setting up explosions to destroy the gate; in this they were successful. The Christians charged at the gate and discovered there was another gate; nevertheless, the Christians still charged and planted the explosions.

But before any explosion happens, the firecracker operator from Naples was killed, and the one from Malta was badly wounded. The attack had failed as nobody knew how to set or lighten up the explosions. The Christians were forced to endure the bombardment coming from the walls. During this time, the captains Don Cristóbal de Rojas and Pablo Colón were killed, and the Castilian of Capua Antonio de Rojas, the captains Íñigo de Urquiza and Sancho de Melgar, and two other captains from Malta were wounded.

Seeing the many men who were being killed and wounded and that there was no one to set off the fireworks, the Tunisians charged at the Christians. The Prince attempted to land artillery to fight back, but the generals argued that their numbers are smaller compared to the Tunisians, so it was decided to retreat and reembark, which was done in good order, although some Tunisians attacked the retreating Christians. The failed expedition ended with 150 men killed in the attack. The armada set sail and arrived to Syracuse on the 23rd.

== Aftermath ==
In retaliation for the attack on Sousse, the Ottomans sacked the city of Manfredonia in the Kingdom of Naples in August 1620.

== Sources ==
- Roger Charles Anderson (1952), Naval Wars in the Levant, 1559–1853.
- Youssef el Alaoui (2017), Morisques (1501–1614), Une histoire si familière.
- Cesáreo Fernández Duro (2012), El gran Duque de Osuna y su marina, Jornadas contra Turcos y venecianos (1602–1624).
