= Castello di Manfredonia =

Concentric castle in Manfredonia, Italy

- Manfredonia, Apulia, Italy
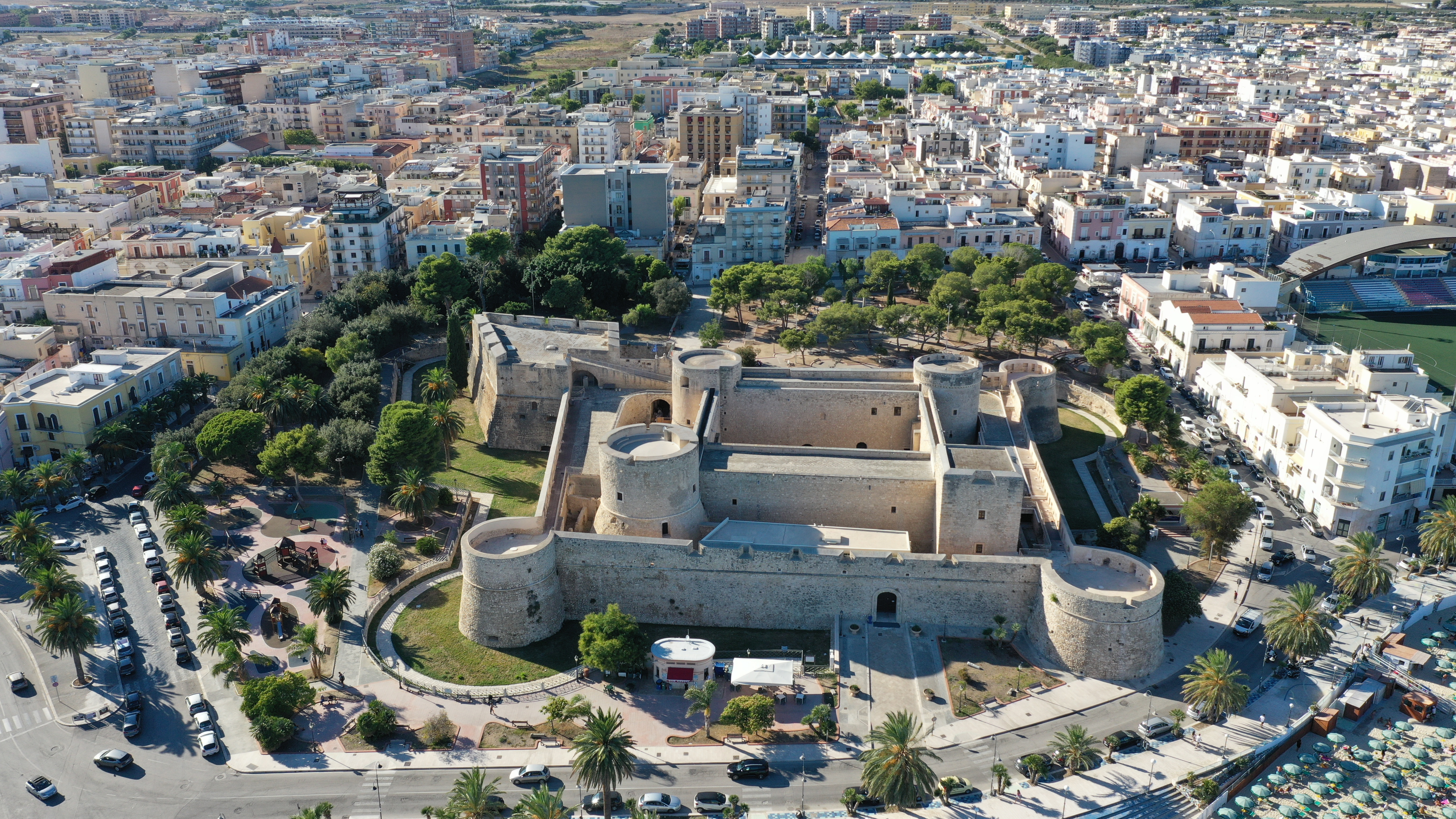
- Aerial photograph of the castle taken in 2020

Site information
- Type: Concentric castle
- Owner: Government of Italy
- Open to the public: Yes
- Condition: Intact

Location
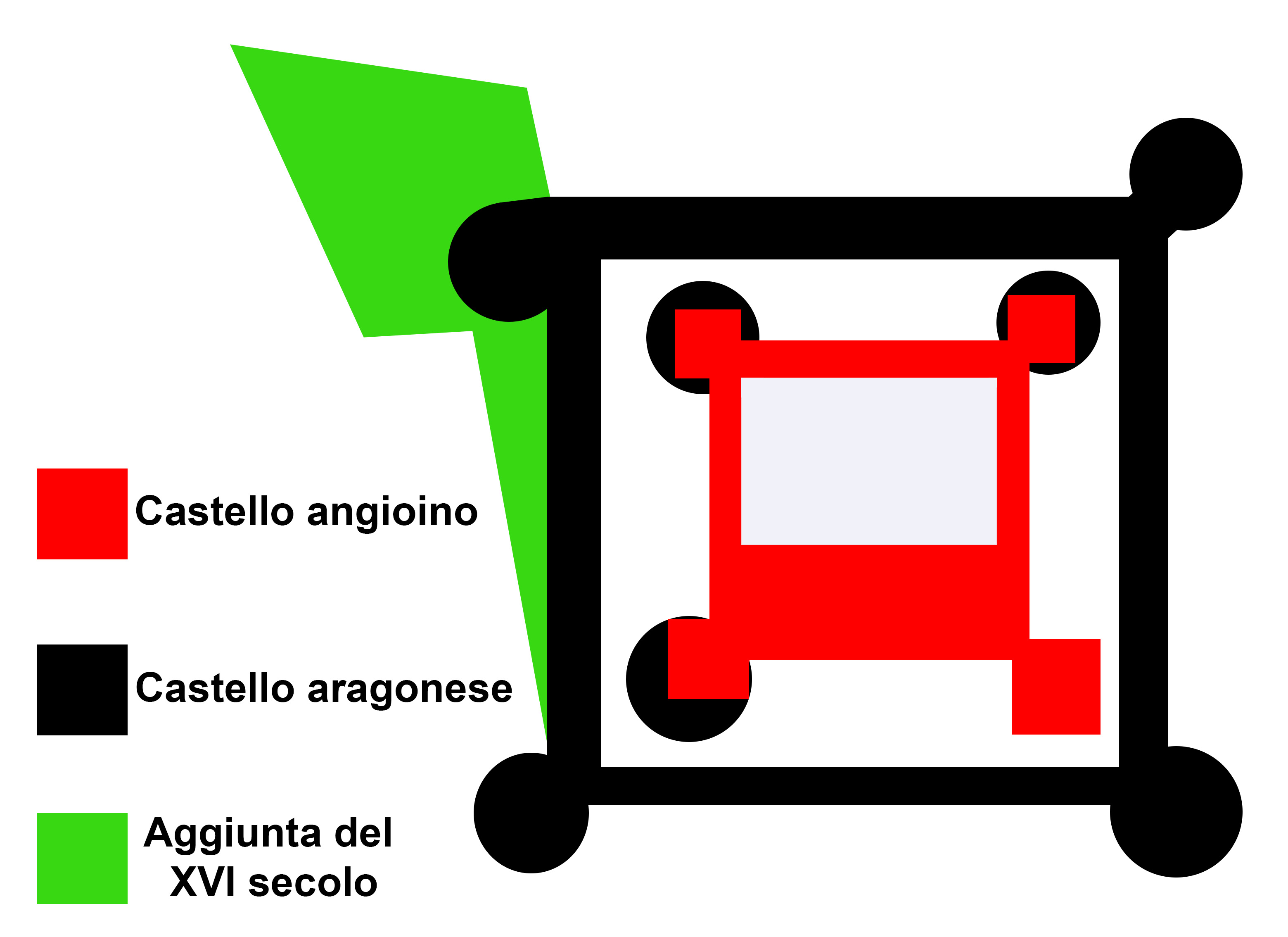
- Plan of the castle highlighting the sequence of construction
- Coordinates: 41°37′50″N 15°55′21″E

Site history
- Built: 13th century (original castle); 15th–16th centuries (modifications and extensions)
- Built by: Kingdom of Sicily / Kingdom of Naples (under Swabian, Angevin, Aragonese and Spanish rule)
- Battles/wars: Sack of Manfredonia (1620)

The Castello di Manfredonia, also known as the Castello Svevo-Angioino-Aragonese, is a concentric castle in Manfredonia, Apulia, Italy. Its architecture shows Swabian influences and King Manfred is traditionally credited with initiating its construction, but documentary evidence suggests that construction commenced in 1279, during the period of Angevin rule.

The castle was later modified and extended during Aragonese and Spanish rule in the 15th and 16th centuries, and it was sacked by the Ottoman Empire in 1620. It remained in use for military purposes until the 19th century, and since 1980 it has been open to the public as an archaeology museum known as the Museo Archeologico Nazionale di Manfredonia.

== History ==
The castle was originally built in the 13th century when the Kingdom of Sicily was under Swabian rule. It is traditionally attested to have been built at the initiative of King Manfred and was completed during the reign of his Angevin successor Charles I of Anjou. The oldest known documentary evidence of the castle dates back to Angevin rule, with documents referring to the recruitment of specialised labourers for its construction in April 1279. The castle's architecture shows some Swabian influences, and it is possible that work which commenced in 1279 incorporated a pre-existing structure possibly built by Manfred.

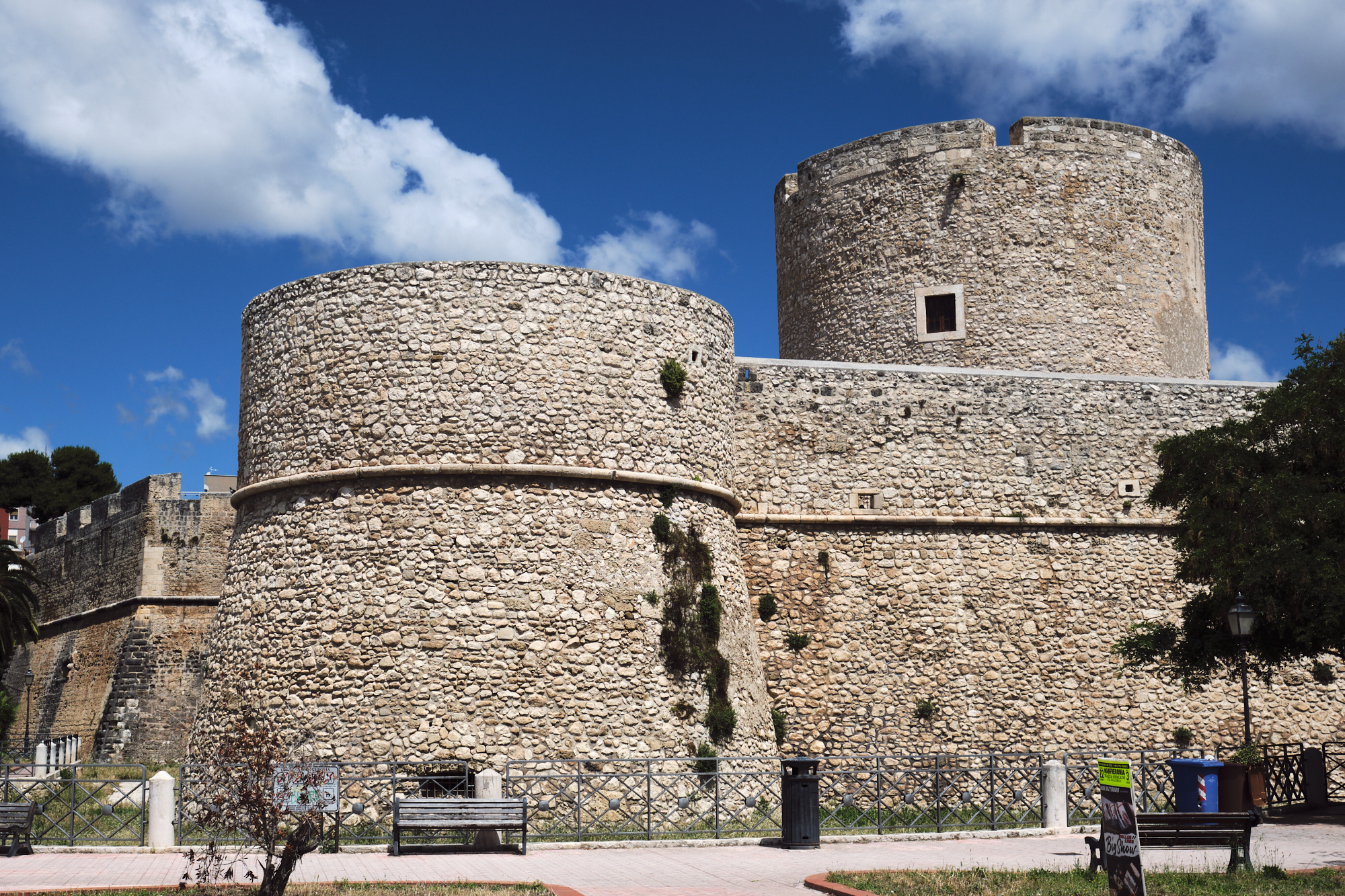
The southern towers of the castle as photographed in 2023

During the second half of the 15th century, while under Aragonese rule, the castle was modified and enlarged and most of its present appearance dates back to this period. While under Spanish rule, the city successfully resisted a siege by a French army led by Odet de Foix, Viscount of Lautrec during the War of the League of Cognac in 1528. After the siege, in around the mid-16th century, a bastion as added and this gave the castle its present form.

On 16 August 1620, when the castle was under the command of castellan Fernando de Velasco, Manfredonia was attacked by an Ottoman force of at least 6,000 men led by Damat Halil Pasha. The Ottomans quickly took control of most of the city and proceeded to sack it, while many citizens took refuge within the castle and its small garrison of around 100 men (some of whom were unable to fight due to wounds or illness) resisted an assault from land and sea for around seven hours. The Ottomans retreated for the night but continued the attack at dawn on the following day. They seized the castle's guardhouse and entered its ditch, but attempts to scale the walls using ladders were repelled by the defenders. An army under governor Francesco Carafa attempted to relieve Manfredonia but failed to reach the city, and the outnumbered and exhausted defenders decided to surrender and raised a white flag during the afternoon of 17 August.

After a series of negotiations, it was agreed that the castle would be surrendered to the in return for the safety of all of those who had taken refuge inside. These terms were respected, and the castellan, the officers and soldiers under his command, their families, and some women, elderly and nuns were allowed to leave the castle and the city on 18 August. The Ottomans plundered the castle's gunpowder stores, armaments and provisions before burning and abandoning it later that same day. The attack of 1620 revealed the castle's weaknesses, including insufficient artillery, the lack of adequate parapet walls, and the fact that it was overlooked by taller buildings including the palaces of the Vischi and Cessa families, from which the Ottomans had stationed arquebusiers to fire into the castle. Efforts to improve its defences were made after the attack, and Viceroy Antonio Zapata y Cisneros ordered the new captain, Gonzalo Ribero, to construct parapets and quarters for troops stationed in the castle, while the maestro di campo Annibale Macedonio was ordered to demolish the Vischi and Cessa residences.

The castle lost its defensive function after the sack and in subsequent centuries it saw various uses, housing barracks in the 18th century and a prison. Some minor renovations were carried out in the process, and it remained in use as a fortress until 1884. It belonged to the Orfanotrofio Militare di Napoli from 1888 to 1901, when it was purchased by the municipality of Manfredonia.

The municipality donated the castle to the Italian government in 1968. Since 1980 it has been open to the public as an archaeology museum known as the Museo Archeologico Nazionale di Manfredonia, housing artifacts discovered in the Gargano area including an important collection of Daunian stelae.

== Architecture ==
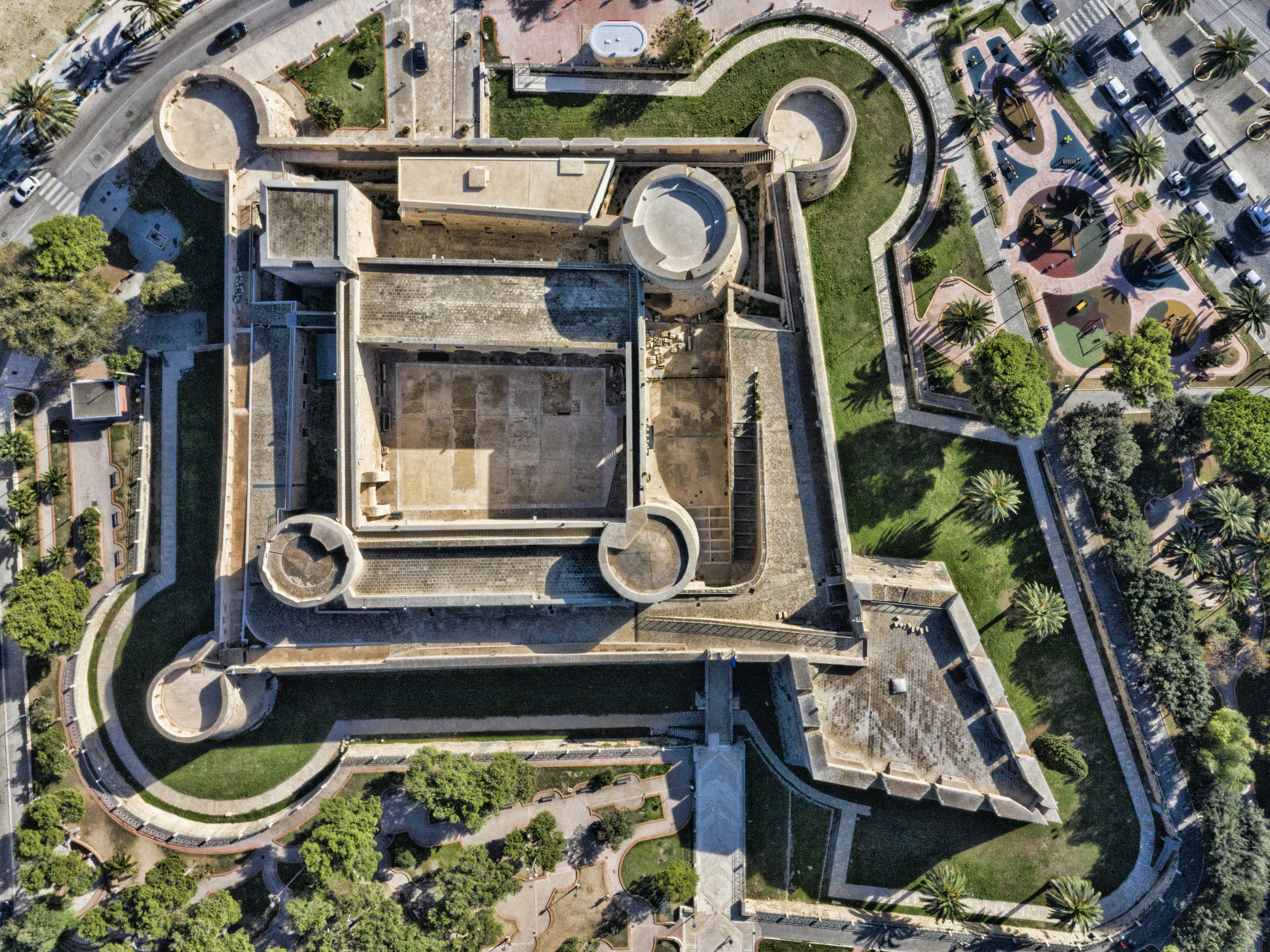
Aerial photograph of the castle taken in 2018, showing its concentric layout

The castle originally had a quadrangular plan with square corner towers. During Aragonese rule, three of these were altered into cylindrical towers and a second series of curtain walls with cylindrical corner towers was constructed around the original nucleus, transforming it into a concentric castle. A fifth tower also existed but few remains of it have survived.

A pentagonal bastion known as the bastione dell'Annunziata was later constructed instead of one of the outer corner towers.
