= Maltese Corso =

Navy Operation

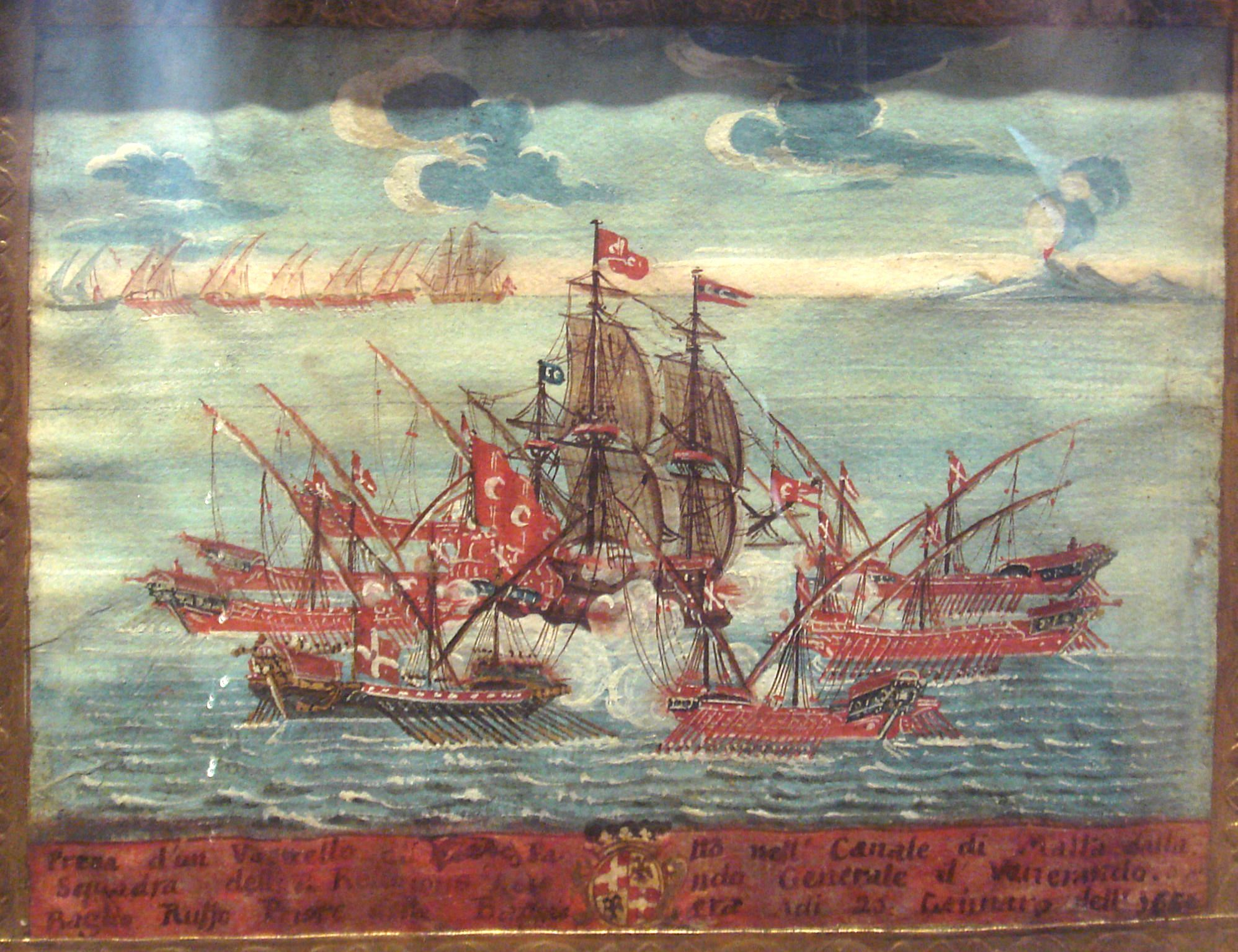
Hospitaller galleys capturing an Ottoman vessel in the Malta Channel in 1652

The Maltese Corso, also known as the Corto Maltese, was a long-standing naval operation from 1530 to 1798 conducted by the Knights Hospitaller based on the Island of Malta, waged against the Ottoman Empire's navy and merchant shipping on the coast of North Africa, and (as the Ottoman influence weakened) against the semi-independent Ottoman vassals, the Deylik of Algiers, the Eyalet of Tripoli, the Eyalet of Tunis, and the Barbary pirates. The Corso reached its peak intensity in the years from 1660 to 1675, and slowly waned during the following decades, eventually reduced to only seven ships in 1724, before finally coming to an end with Malta's capitulation to Napoleon in June 1798.

Although the Maltese Corso is not well known, it was one of the main factors in the economic decline of the Islamic World, and rise of European military dominance at sea, which would have a pronounced impact across the globe facilitating European commerce and colonization. This legacy makes the Maltese Corso one of the most pivotal events in history.

== Early Years, the Great Siege of Malta and Lepanto, 1522-1571 ==
After being driven from Rhodes by the Ottoman Sultan Suleiman the Magnificent in the Siege of Rhodes in 1522 the Knights began looking for a new home. After brief sojourns in Venetian Crete, Viterbo and Nice, the Knights were offered Malta, as well as the city of Tripoli, in 1530 by Holy Roman Emperor Charles V, an island from which they could harass Muslim shipping as their contribution to Charles' struggle against the Ottomans.

While settling themselves on Malta and rebuilding their navy the Knights took part in various actions, including the May 1535 Spanish conquest of Tunis. They lost Tripoli to the Ottomans in 1551, but continued to rebuild on Malta and to attack the Turks at sea whenever they could. During this era the orders greatest naval commander was Mathurin Romegas, who became a Knight in 1546 and soon became the terror of Muslims on the waters and shores of the Mediterranean, continually raiding along the Barbary Coast, the Levant and the Aegean Sea and capturing numerous ships and slaves.

Serving with the Order’s General of the Galleys, Gozon de Melac, Romegas battled repeatedly with the galleys of Turgut Reis, captured Penon de Velez in 1564, on the North African coast opposite Malaga, a major stronghold of the Barbary Pirates, and enraged the Ottoman Sultan Suleiman the Magnificent. Shortly after the capture of the Penon de Velez, several Maltese galleys, under Romegas, attacked and after a very bloody battle captured a large and heavily armed Ottoman galleon, under the command of Bairan Ogli Reis and with 200 Janissaries on board, near Kefalonia. The owner of the ship was Kustir Agha, the chief eunuch of the Sultan’s Seraglio, and the merchandise it carried, valued at about 80,000 ducats, was his and that of a number of the sultan’s ladies, including his favorite daughter. Among the prisoners they took were the governor of Cairo, the governor of Alexandria, and the former nurse of Suleiman's daughter. This event led Suleiman the Magnificent to mobilize the great force that landed on Malta on 18 May 1565 to begin the Great Siege of Malta.

The Great Siege of Malta saw the Knights decisively defeat an Ottoman attempt to seize Malta. This was followed by a flood of donations from grateful European governments which enabled the Knights to build a new Maltese capital at Valletta and to maintain and expand their corso operations across the Mediterranean.
