= Pompeo Sarnelli =

Italian Roman Catholic prelate (1649–1724)

Most Reverend Pompeo Sarnelli
- Bishop of Bisceglie
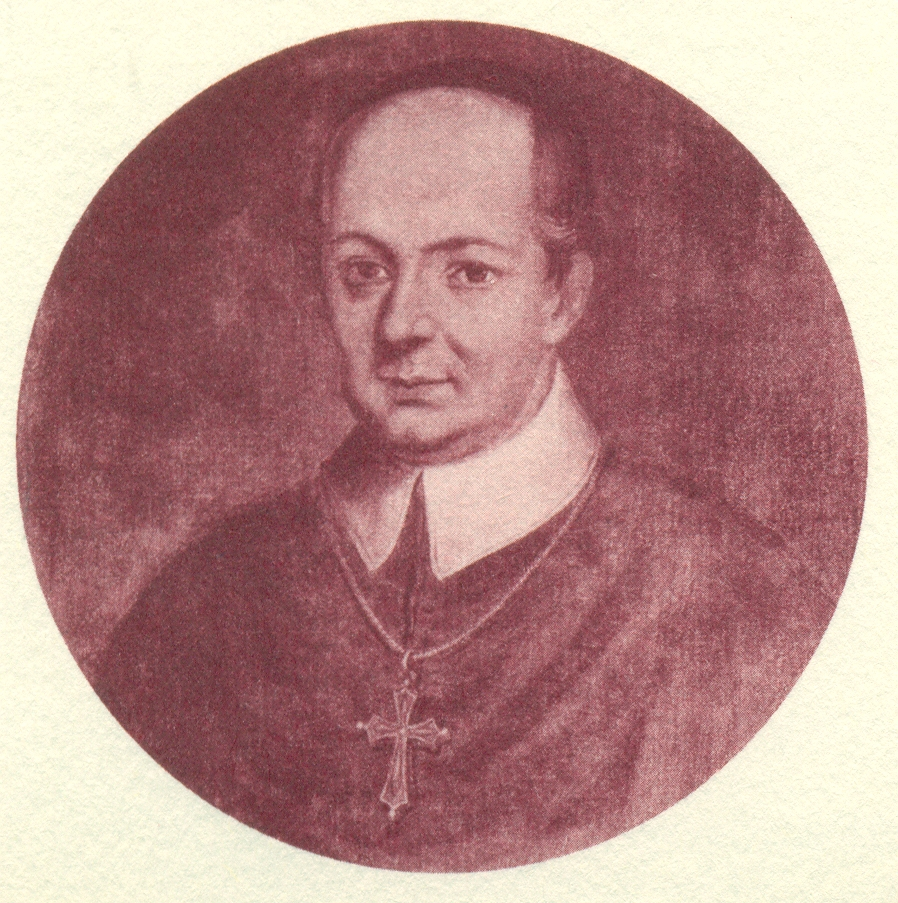
- Church: Catholic Church
- Diocese: Diocese of Bisceglie
- In office: 1692–1724
- Predecessor: Giuseppe Crispini
- Successor: Antonio Pacecco

Orders
- Ordination: 12 March 1672
- Consecration: 4 May 1692 by Pope Benedict XIII

Personal details
- Born: 28 January 1649 Polignano a Mare
- Died: 7 July 1724 (aged 75) Barletta, Italy

Pompeo Sarnelli (born 28 January 1649, died 7 July 1724) was a Roman Catholic prelate who served as Bishop of Bisceglie (1692–1724).

== Biography ==
Pompeo Sarnelli was born in Polignano a Mare, Italy in 1649. He moved to Naples when he was an adolescent. There, he studied theology and law and, after he became a priest in 1669, worked for Cardinal Vincenzo Maria Orsini. In 1689, he refused a position at the bishopric of Termoli. On 24 March 1692, he was appointed during the papacy of Pope Innocent XII as Bishop of Bisceglie. On 4 May 1692, he was consecrated bishop by Pietro Francesco Orsini, Archbishop of Benevento. He served as Bishop of Bisceglie until his death in 1724.

== Works ==
Throughout all his years of activity, Sarnelli wrote several erudite works, in prose and verse, including many elegies and odes in Latin, a commentary on Latin poems (Il filo d’Arianna) and Memories of the Bishops of Bisceglie and of the same Town (Naples 1693), in which church history and local history are fully mixed in a Counter-Reformation way. His Bestiarum schola, a collection of moralizing fables in prose, was published in 1680. Sarnelli edited Bulifon's edition of Giambattista Basile's The Tale of Tales (1674), the first to bear the alternative title Il Pentamerone, by which Basile's work would subsequently be best known. Its publication marked the beginning of a long and fruitful collaboration between the Frenchman Bulifon and the Italian Sarnelli, as the priest would serve as Bulifon's most active editor and author over the course of the next thirty years. For Bulifon's press, Sarnelli wrote theological and devotional treatises, school readers, and a collection of five fairy tales written in Neapolitan language which bore the title of Posilecheata (1684). In 1710, Sarnelli authored the first commentary on the surviving portions of the Book of the Watchers, the first section of the Book of Enoch. He also edited Italian translations of della Porta's Chirofisonomia and Magia Naturalis (1677).

== Bibliography ==
- Zipes, J. (2002). "Sarnelli, Pompeo". The Oxford Companion to Fairy Tales. Oxford University Press. ISBN 978-0-19-860509-6.
- D’Eugenio, Daniela, “Irony and Hilarity of Neapolitan Paroemias in Pompeo Sarnelli’s Posilecheata (1684).” Humour in Italy Through the Ages, Part I of a Double Special Issue. International Studies in Humour. Nissan, Ephraim, ed. 5 1 (2016): 74–111.
