= Theatrum Europaeum =

Theatrum Europaeum was a journal on the history of the German-speaking lands by Matthäus Merian, published between 1633 and 1738 in 21 quarto volumes.

== Edition overview ==
	period covered	Author	edition					
	period covered	Author	I.	II.	III.	IV.	V.	VI.
1.	1618–1629	Joh. Phil. Abelin	1635	1643	1662 (2)	later than 1662		
2.	1629–1633	Joh. Phil. Abelin und Joh. Flittner	1633	1637	1646	1679	later than 1679	(later than 1679)
3.	1633–1638	Hch. Oraeus	1639	1644	1670	later than 1670	later than 1670	
4.	1638–1643	I.P.A. V.M.	1643	later than 1643	1648 (2)	1692		
5.	1643–1647	Joh. Peter Lotichius	1647	1651	1707			
6.	1647–1651	Joh. Georg Schleder	1652	1663	later than 1663			
7.	1651–1658	Joh. Georg Schleder	1663	1685	later than 1685			
8.	1658–1660	Martin Meyer	1667	1693				
9.	1661–1665	Martin Meyer	1672	1699 (2)				
10.	1666–1671	Martin Meyer und Wolfg. Jacob Geiger	1677	1703				
11.	1672–1679	(anonymous)	1682	ca. 1707				
12.	1679–1687	(anonymous)	1691	later than 1691				
13.	1687–1691	(anonymous)	1698					
14.	1691–1695	(anonymous)	1702					
15.	1696–1700	(anonymous)	1707 (2)(3)					
16.	1701–1703	Daniel Schneider (published anonymously)	1708	1717	later than 1717			
17.	1704–1706	Daniel Schneider	1718 (2)(3)	1720				
18.	1707–1709	Daniel Schneider	1720 (2)(3)					
19.	1710–1712	Daniel Schneider	1723	later than 1723				
20.	1713–1715	Daniel Schneider	1734					
21.	1716–1718	Daniel Schneider and Gabriel Schweder	1738					
