= Lala Süleyman Agha =

Chief Black Eunuch of the Ottoman Empire from 1651 to 1652

Lala Uzun Süleyman Agha

Chief Black Eunuch of the Ottoman Empire
- In office September 1651 – July 1652
- Monarch: Mehmed IV
- Preceded by: Mehmed Agha
- Succeeded by: Yusuf Agha

Personal details
- Died: 1676 Lemnos, Ottoman Greece (now Lemnos, Greece)
- Cause of death: Execution

Lala Süleyman Agha (died 1676), also known as Uzun Süleyman Agha (lit.Tall Süleyman), was an Ottoman Eunuch who served as Chief Black Eunuch of the Ottoman Empire from 1651 to 1652, he is commonly known for his role in the assassination of Kösem Sultan which occurred on 2 September 1651.

== Biography ==
Süleyman Agha was of unknown origins, however eunuchs of the Imperial harem were mostly of the African descent. At the time of the ascension of Şehzade Mehmed to the throne at the age of six, after the deposition of his father Sultan Ibrahim in 1648, Süleyman Agha was the head black eunuch in his mother's suite. Due to regency passing to Kösem Sultan the grandmother of Mehmed, instead to his mother Turhan Sultan, she would grow ambitious and began to assert what she saw as her rightful authority. In August 1651 Süleyman convinced Turhan to appoint Siyavuş Pasha to office of the Grand Vizier over the Janissary Agha preferred by Kösem. However Siyavuş would show dissatisfaction with Süleyman's influence as he would say:

"What kind of vizierate is this, when im dominated and ruled by an African?"

Shortly afterwards Süleyman would confront him and threatened to "break his mouth" if he refused to hand over the grand vizier seal, Siyavuş would soon after be replaced and imprisoned in Yedikule Fortress.

His replacement was Gürcü Mehmed Pasha who was merely a tool for Turhan and her harem eunuchs. Süleyman's influence would rise rapidly as he would deliberately turn Turhan and Kösem against each other, which would trigger a response from Kösem who plotted to depose and execute Turhan and have her son poisoned, and replace them with Şehzade Süleyman and his mother Dilaşub Sultan. However, her plans were revealed to Turhan by one of Kösem's slaves named Meleki. On the night of 2 September 1651, Lala Süleyman Agha accompanied by a large number of Turhan's supporters would try to get access to Kösem by asking her chief guards to let them in; after they refused, Süleyman and his followers attacked them and cut them to pieces, however largely outnumbered as Kösem's chambers were guarded by 300 armed Janissaries they managed to defeat them. Hearing the tumult, Kösem tried to escape into the inner rooms of her chambers before being found by Kuçuk Mehmed Agha who beat her before Süleyman strangled her with curtains.

In June 1652 Süleyman would attempt to depose the Grand Vizier Gürcü Mehmed Pasha and replace him again with Siyavuş who was previously deposed by Süleyman in 1651, however, his plans failed as Tarhoncu Ahmed Pasha would be appointed as Grand Vizier on the wish of Turhan Sultan. Soon after Ahmed's appointment Süleyman would be exiled to Egyptand replaced by Yusuf Agha as the chief black eunuch. In 1654 in the Habeş Vak'ası (Abyssinia Incident) a group of Cairo eunuchs staged a public protest in response to remarks made by Egyptian soldiers regarding the rebellion in Habesh. When the Governor of Egypt, Haseki Mehmed Pasha, was petitioned for military support to suppress the uprising, the Egyptian regiments, overextended from previous campaigns, refused to intervene directly. They suggested that the "eunuchs slaves and followers" perform the mission instead, in this protest Lala Süleyman would be involved and subsequently imprisoned in the fortress of Ibrim alongside other prominent eunuchs, after the protest was put down, before returning to live in Cairo several years later until 1670’s.

== Death ==
In 1676, Lala Süleyman Agha would join a delegation of soldiers travelling to the court of Mehmed IV in Edirne to announce the deposition of the Governor of Egypt, before being arrested for "interfering with the soldiers" and would be recognised as one of the murderers of Kösem Sultan, before being exiled to island of Lemnos and executed there in 1676 by sultanic decree.

== In popular culture ==
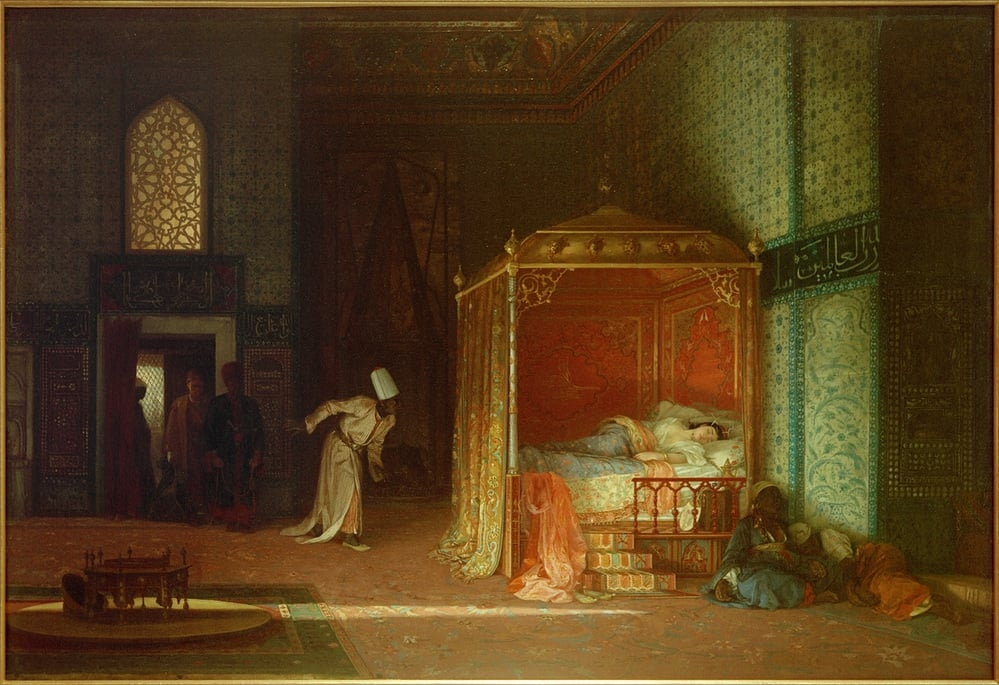
Drama in a Harem (by Stanisław Chlebowski, 1870), which depicts Süleyman entering Kösem's chambers.

- In 2010 historical movie Mahpeyker, Süleyman Agha is portrayed by actor Kıvanç Doğu.
- In the 2015 TV series Muhteşem Yüzyıl: Kösem, Süleyman Agha is portrayed by actor Fırat Topkorur.

== See also ==
- Ottoman Imperial Harem
- Kizlar Agha
- Kösem Sultan
- Slavery in the Ottoman Empire
