= Slavery in the Ottoman Empire =

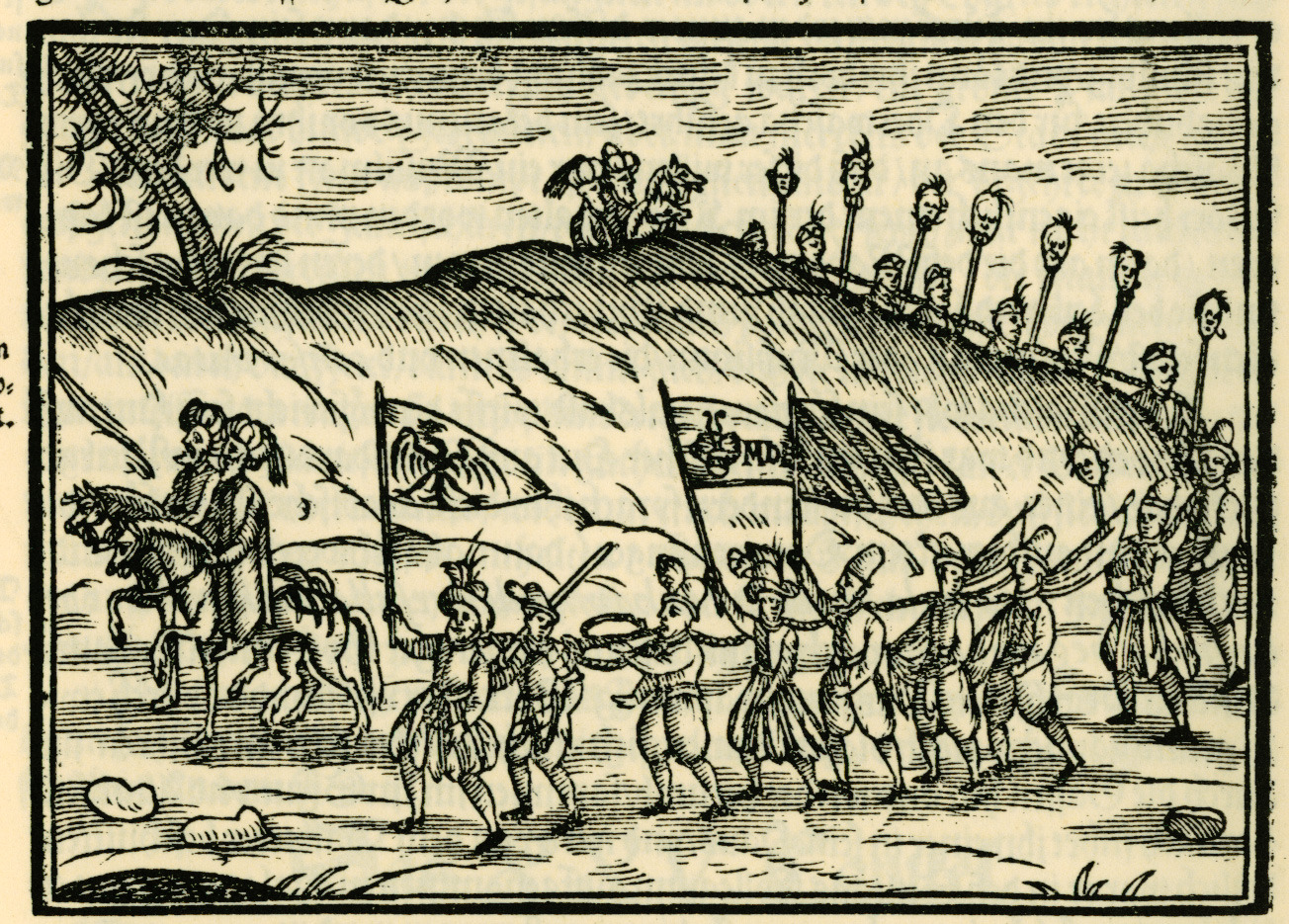
Ottomans with European slaves, depicted in a 1608 engraving in Salomon Schweigger's account of his 1578 journey in the Ottoman Empire.

Chattel slavery was a major institution and a significant part of the Ottoman Empire's economy and traditional society.

The main sources of slaves were wars and politically organized enslavement expeditions in the Caucasus, Eastern Europe, Southern Europe, Central Europe, Southeast Europe, the Western Mediterranean and Africa. It has been reported that the selling price of slaves decreased after large military operations.

In Constantinople (present-day Istanbul), the administrative and political center of the Ottoman Empire, about a fifth of the 16th- and 17th-century population consisted of slaves. The number of slaves imported to the Ottoman Empire from various geographic sources in the early modern period remains inadequately quantified. The Ottoman historians Halil İnalcık and Dariusz Kołodziejczyk have tentatively estimated that 2 million enslaved persons of Rus, Pole, and Ukrainian extraction, captured in Tatar raids, entered the Ottoman Empire between 1500 and 1700. However, other historians, most notably Alan Fisher, have argued that the propensity of contemporary sources on both sides of the Black Sea slave trade to inflate their estimates for the number of captives taken by Tatar raiders has rendered it impossible to accurately calculate the number of enslaved persons passing into Ottoman lands via this route. In addition, an estimated 1 to 1.5 million slaves entered the Ottoman Empire from the Mediterranean between 1530 and 1780. A smaller number of slaves also arrived in this period from the Caucasus, Africa, and other regions, but exact figures remain to be calculated.

Individual members of the Ottoman slave class, called a kul in Turkish, could achieve high status in some positions. Eunuch harem guards and janissaries are some of the better known positions an enslaved person could hold, but enslaved women were actually often supervised by them. However, women played and held the most important roles within the harem institution. A large percentage of officials in the Ottoman government were bought as slaves, raised free, and integral to the success of the Ottoman Empire from the 14th to 19th centuries. Many enslaved officials themselves owned numerous slaves, although the Sultan himself owned by far the most. By raising and specially training slaves as officials in palace schools such as Enderun, where they were taught to serve the Sultan and other educational subjects, the Ottomans created administrators with intricate knowledge of government and fanatic loyalty.

Other slaves were simply laborers used for hard labor, such as for example agricultural laborers and galley slaves. Female slaves were primarily used as either domestic house servants or as concubines (sex slaves), who were subjected to harem gender segregation. While there were slaves of many different ethnicities and race was not the determined factor in who could be enslaved, there was still a racial hierarchy among slaves, since slaves were valued and assigned tasks and considered to have different abilities due to racial stereotypes.{{citation needed}}

Even after several measures to ban slave trade and restrict slavery, introduced due to Western diplomatic pressure in the late 19th century, the practice continued largely unabated into the early 20th century.

== Background ==
The institution of slavery in the Ottoman Empire was modelled on the institution of slavery in the previous Muslim empires of the Middle East: the slavery in the Rashidun Caliphate (632–661), the slavery in the Umayyad Caliphate (661–750), slavery in the Abbasid Caliphate (750–1258) and slavery in the Mamluk Sultanate (1258–1516), which in turn were all built upon slavery in Islamic Law.

Slavery was regulated by the Seriat, the religious Islamic Law, and by the secular Sultan's law Kanun, which was essentially supplementary regulations to facilitate the implementation of the Seriat law. Islamic Law allowed for Muslims to enslave non-Muslims, unless they were zimmis (protected minorities who had accepted Muslim rule), and slaves were therefore non-Muslims imported from non-Muslim lands outside of the Empire. While Muslims could only enslave non-Muslims, the conversion of a non-Muslim slave to Islam after their enslavement did not require the enslaver to manumit his slave.

Since all non-Muslims outside of Muslim lands were legitimate targets of enslavement, there were slaves of different races. Officially, there were no difference made between slaves of difference races, but in practice, white slaves were given the highest status, with Ethiopians second and fully black African slaves given the lowest status among slaves.

== Ottoman slave trade ==
Slaves were transported to the Ottoman Empire via several different routes, targeting different supply sources. The Ottoman Empire focused on three main slave trade routes: white slaves from the Balkans used for military slavery; black slaves imported from Africa, often from Sudan via Egypt; and white slaves imported via the Black Sea and Caucasus.

=== African slave trade ===
Africa was a major supplier of slaves for the Ottoman empire. The Africans were largely pagans and therefore viewed, under Islamic law, as legitimate targets for enslavement. Slaves were brought to the Ottoman empire by three main routes: the trans-Saharan slave trade, to Egypt and Libya; the Red Sea slave trade, across that sea; and the Indian Ocean slave trade, from East Africa via the Indian Ocean and the Arabian Peninsula. These slave routes were all inherited from the Muslim empires which had preceded the Ottoman.

==== Indian Ocean slave trade ====
As there were restrictions on the enslavement of Muslims and of "People of the Book" (Jews and Christians) living under Muslim rule, pagan areas in Africa became a popular source of slaves. Known as the Zanj (Bantu), these slaves originated mainly from the African Great Lakes region as well as from Central Africa.

The Zanj were employed in households, on plantations and in the army as slave-soldiers. Some could ascend to become high-rank officials, but in general Zanj were considered inferior to European and Caucasian slaves.

One way for Zanj slaves to serve in high-ranking roles involved becoming one of the African eunuchs of the Ottoman palace. This position was used as a political tool by Sultan Murad III (r. 1574–1595) as an attempt to destabilize the Grand Vizier by introducing another source of power to the capital.

After being purchased by a member of the Ottoman court, Mullah Ali was introduced to the first chief Black eunuch, Mehmed Aga. Due to Mehmed Aga's influence, Mullah Ali was able to make connections with prominent colleges and tutors of the day, including Hoca Sadeddin Efendi (1536/37–1599), the tutor of Murad III. Through the network he had built with the help of his education and the black eunuchs, Mullah Ali secured several positions early on. He worked as a teacher in Istanbul, a deputy judge, and an inspector of royal endowments. In 1620, Mullah Ali was appointed as chief judge of the capital and in 1621 he became the kadiasker, or chief judge, of the European provinces and the first black man to sit on the imperial council. At this time, he had risen to such power that a French ambassador described him as the person who truly ran the empire.

Although Mullah Ali was often challenged because of his blackness and his connection to the African eunuchs, he was able to defend himself through his powerful network of support and his own intellectual productions. As a prominent scholar, he wrote an influential book in which he used logic and the Quran to debunk stereotypes and prejudice against dark-skinned people and to delegitimize arguments for why Africans should be slaves. Today, thousands of Afro Turks, the descendants of the Zanj slaves in the Ottoman Empire, continue to live in modern Turkey. An Afro-Turk, Mustafa Olpak, founded the first officially recognised organisation of Afro-Turks, the Africans' Culture and Solidarity Society (Afrikalılar Kültür ve Dayanışma Derneği) in Ayvalık. Olpak claims that about 2,000 Afro-Turks live in modern Turkey.

==== Red Sea slave trade ====
The Upper Nile Valley and southern Ethiopia were also significant sources of slaves in the Ottoman Empire. Although the Christian Ethiopians defeated the Ottoman invaders in the Ottoman–Ethiopian War of 1557–1589, they did not tackle enslavement of southern pagans and Muslims as long as they were paid taxes by the Ottoman slave traders. Pagans and Muslims from southern Ethiopian areas such as Kaffa and Jimma were taken north to Ottoman Egypt and also to ports on the Red Sea for export to Arabia and the Persian Gulf via the Red Sea slave trade.

In 1838, it was estimated that 10,000 to 12,000 slaves were arriving in Egypt annually using this route. A significant number of these slaves were young women, and European travelers in the region recorded seeing large numbers of Ethiopian slaves in the Arab world at the time. The Swiss traveler Johann Ludwig Burckhardt estimated that 5,000 Ethiopian slaves passed through the port of Suakin alone every year, headed for Arabia, and added that most of them were young women who ended up being prostituted by their owners. The English traveler Charles M. Doughty later (in the 1880s) also recorded Ethiopian slaves in Arabia, and stated that they were brought to Arabia every year during the Hajj pilgrimage. In some cases, female Ethiopian slaves were preferred to male ones, with some Ethiopian slave cargoes recording female-to-male slave ratios of two to one. Zubayr pasha of Sudan, whom achieved the rank of bey and pasha was an infamous slaver, slave trader and governor.

==== Trans-Saharan slave trade ====
Ottoman Libya (1551–1912) was a major route for the Trans-Saharan slave trade from Sub-Saharan Africa across the Sahara to the Ottoman Empire.

Even though the slave trade was officially abolished in Tripoli by the Firman of 1857, this law was never enforced, and continued in practice at least until the 1890s.

The British Consul in Benghazi wrote in 1875 that the slave trade had reached an enormous scale and that the slaves who were sold in Alexandria and Constantinople had quadrupled in price. This trade, he wrote, was encouraged by the local government.

The slave trade in Libya continued throughout the Ottoman period. Adolf Vischer writes in an article published in 1911 that: "...it has been said that slave traffic is still going on on the Benghazi-Wadai route, but it is difficult to test the truth of such an assertion as, in any case, the traffic is carried on secretly".

The Trans-Saharan slave trade via Libya was not eradicated until late into the Italian colonial period of Libya.

=== Barbary slave trade ===
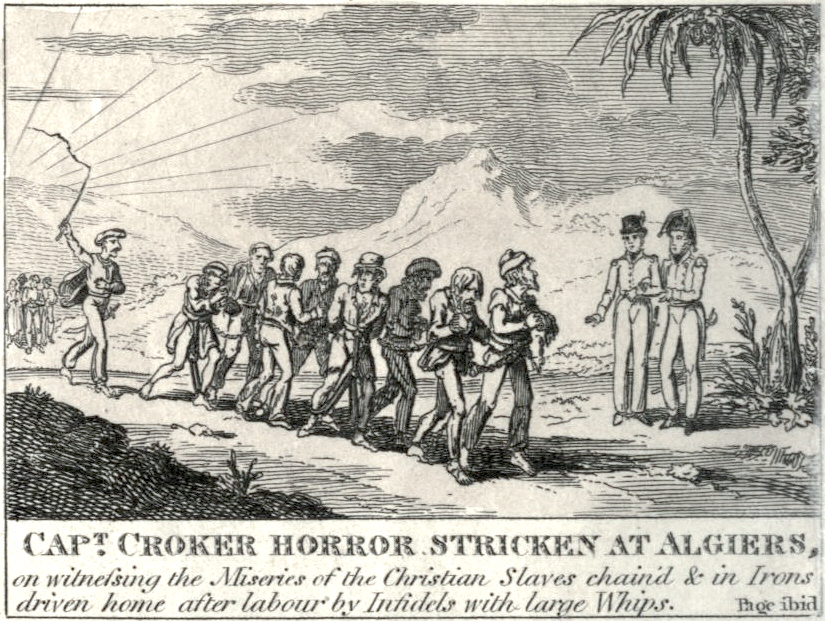
European slaves in Algiers drawing by Walter Croker, 1815

For centuries, large vessels on the Mediterranean relied on European galley slaves supplied by Ottoman and Barbary slave traders. Hundreds of thousands of European Christians were captured by Barbary pirates and sold as slaves in North Africa and the Ottoman Empire between the 16th and 19th centuries.

During the height of the Barbary slave trade in the 16th, 17th, and 18th centuries, the Barbary states, with the exception of Morocco, were nominally part of the Ottoman Empire, but de facto independent. Many slaves captured by the Barbary corsairs were sold eastward into Ottoman territories before, during, and after Barbary's period of Ottoman rule. While most of the slave raids occurred in the Western Mediterranean, some raiders plundered as far north as Ireland, the Faroe Islands, and Iceland.

The Barbary slave trade was ended with the Barbary Wars in the early 19th century.

=== Circassian slave trade ===
During the early modern Crimean slave trade, the trade of Circassians from the Caucasus expanded and developed in to what was termed a luxury slave trade route, providing elite slaves to the Ottoman Empire and the Middle East. The Crimean slave trade was one of the biggest suppliers of concubines (female sex slaves) to the Ottoman Imperial Harem, and virgin slave girls (normally arriving as children) were given to the Sultan from local statesmen, family members, grand dignitaries and provincial governors, and particularly from the Crimean Khan; the Ottoman Sultan Ahmed III received one hundred Circassian virgin girl slaves as presents upon his accession to the throne. When the Crimean slave trade was ended with the Annexation of the Crimean Khanate by the Russian Empire in the 18th century, the trade of Circassians was redirected from Crimea and went directly from the Caucasus to the Ottoman Empire, developing in to a separate slave trade which continued until the 20th century.

=== Crimean slave trade ===
A major source of the supply of slaves for the Ottoman market originated from the periodic raids of the Crimean Khanate, along with their Nogai and Circassian allies, launched against the neighboring regions, particularly the southern territories of the Polish-Lithuanian Commonwealth, but also Moscow and the Caucasus. These raids could be organized as major military campaigns by the Crimean Khan or undertaken alone by the various Crimean and Nogai Mirzas themselves. The captives were either kept by the raiders as their own personal slaves, or sent to the markets of the various ports along the north Black Sea coast(particularly Kaffa) where they would either be manumitted for ransom or sold into slavery across the sea, into the domain of the Ottoman Empire.[37] [38] The 17th century Ottoman writer and traveller Evliya Çelebi estimated that there were about 400,000 slaves in the Crimea but only 187,000 free Muslims.[37] Polish historian Bohdan Baranowski assumed that in the 17th century the Polish–Lithuanian Commonwealth (present-day Poland, [Ukraine] and Belarus) lost an average of 20,000 yearly and as many as one million in all years combined from 1500 to 1644.[37]

The Black Sea slave trade was a major supply source of slaves to the Ottoman Empire. The center of the Black Sea slave trade was Crimea. The Crimean Khanate conducted regular slave raids in to Eastern Europe, known as Crimean-Nogai slave raids in Eastern Europe. The captives were taken to Crimea, were they were divided between the Crimean Khanate and the Ottoman Empire, since the Crimean Khanate was the vassal of the Ottoman Empire.

The Crimean Khanate maintained a massive slave trade with the Ottoman Empire and the Middle East until the late eighteenth century. In a series of slave raids euphemistically known as the "harvesting of the steppe", Crimean Tatars enslaved East Slavic peasants. The Polish–Lithuanian Commonwealth and Russia suffered a series of Tatar invasions, the goal of which was to loot, pillage, and capture slaves, the Slavic languages even developed a term for the Ottoman slavery (Polish: jasyr, based on Turkish and Arabic words for capture - esir or asir). The borderland area to the south-east was in a state of semi-permanent warfare until the 18th century. It is estimated that up to 75% of the Crimean population consisted of slaves or freedmen, and much of the free population was either engaged in the slave raiding or in the selling of slaves. The 17th century Ottoman writer and traveller Evliya Çelebi estimated that there were about 400,000 slaves in the Crimea but only 187,000 free Muslims. Polish historian Bohdan Baranowski assumed that in the 17th century the Polish–Lithuanian Commonwealth (present-day Poland, Ukraine and Belarus) lost an average of 20,000 yearly and as many as one million in all years combined from 1500 to 1644.

A Hutterite chronicle reports that in 1605, during the Long Turkish War, some 240 Hutterites were abducted from their homes in Upper Hungary by the Ottoman Turkish army and their Tatar allies, and sold into Ottoman slavery. Many worked in the palace or for the Sultan personally.

=== War captives ===
The Ottoman Empire practiced the custom of enslaving both soldiers and civilians from enemy states during wartime. This form of enslavement had a long history in the Muslim world and was in accordance with Islamic law. The definition of war in Islamic law did not necessitate actual warfare, since by the doctrin of Divisions of the world in Islam, the dar al-Islam (the Muslim world) was by definition always in a state of war with dar al-harb (the non-Muslim world). The enslavement of war captives was ongoing from the beginning of the Ottoman conquests in the 14th-century until the Greek War of Independence (1821–1829). In accordance with Islamic law, however, only non-Muslim war captives could be made slaves. Consequently, enslavement only occurred along the frontiers of non-Muslim lands, and did not happen in warfare against Muslim enemies, such as for example the Mamluk Sultanate.

==== Byzantine Empire ====
During the fall of Constantinople of 1453, wartime atrocities connected to slavery took place in which women, girls and boys were subjected to rape and then taken captive and sold in to slavery. Barbaro Nicolò described how the Ottoman soldiers captured nuns whom they first raped and then sold as slaves on the slave market:

And at the same time all those in the fleet on the Dardanelles side disembarked and left their ships by the shore without anyone in them, because they were all running furiously like dogs into the city to seek out gold, jewels and other treasure, and to take merchants prisoner. They sought out the monasteries, and all the nuns were led to the fleet and ravished and abused by the Turks, and then sold at auction for slaves throughout Turkey, and all the young women also were ravished and then sold for whatever they would fetch, although some of them preferred to cast themselves into the wells and drown rather than fall into the hands of the Turks, as did a number of married women also. The Turks loaded all their ships with prisoners and with an enormous quantity of booty.

During the pillage of Constantinople, contemporary witnesses described how women and girls were stripped, raped and captured for a life of slavery in the Hagia Sophia itself:

In the Great Church itself the Turks struggled with each other for the possession of the most beautiful women. Damsels who had been brought up in luxury among the remnants of Byzantine nobility, nuns who had been shut off from the world, became the subjects of violence among their captors. Their garments were torn from them by men who would not relinquish their prizes to others. Masters and mistresses were tied to their servants; dignitaries of the Church with the lowest menials. The captors drove their flocks of victims before them in order to lodge them in safety under charge of their comrades and to return as quickly as possible to take a new batch.

In accordance with Islamic law of slavery in Islam, the non-Muslim war captives could be sold on the slave market to a life of sexual slavery in the form of concubinage in Islam, and Nicolas de Nicolay described how girls were displayed naked at the city's slave market to be purchased.

==== Aegean islands ====
In 1479, during the Ottoman conquest of the Despotate of Epirus, the islands of Santa Mavra, Cephalonia and Ithaka, the ducal officials were "cut to pieces", the castle of Cephalonia was burned and the peasantry was enslaved and taken to Constantinople as a gift to the sultan, who engaged in "slave breeding" by separating husbands and wives and "mating" them with Ethiopian slaves with the purpose of "producing a race of grey slaves", while other slaves from St Mavra were sold by Ahmed Pascha for ten soldi apiece.

In 1537, the Ottoman fleet under Admiral Hayreddin Barbarossa raided the Aegean islands and brought 2,000 captured people back to Constantinople as slaves, one of them being Nurbanu Sultan.

The Ottoman conquest of Paros in 1537 resulted in atrocities committed against the public: as happened to the population in other islands during the Ottoman conquest of the Aegean islands, old men were killed; young men were made galley slaves; little boys were made janissaries; and the women where ordered to dance on the shore so that the conquerors could choose the most attractive for the lieutenants, enslaving around 6000 of the inhabitants of Paros for slavery in the Ottoman Empire.

==== Croatia ====
After the Ottoman victory at the Siege of Bihać (1592) in Croatia, 800 civilians were enslaved by the Ottomans.

==== Cyprus ====
The Ottomans frequently raided Cyprus during Venetian rule. The first year of Venetian control, in 1489, the Ottomans attacked the Karpass Peninsula, pillaging and taking captives to be sold into slavery. In the summer of 1570, the Ottomans launched a full-scale invasion of Venetian Cyprus. Troops under the command of Lala Mustafa Pasha landed near Limassol on July 2, 1570, and laid siege to Nicosia. The city fell on September 9, 1570; after which 20,000 Nicosians were massacred, every church, public building, and palace was looted, men were massacred while women and children were captured to be sold as slaves.

The siege of Nicosia during the Ottoman–Venetian War (1570–1573) began on 22 July and lasted for seven weeks, until 9 September. Finally, after 45 days of siege, on 9 September, the 15th assault succeeded in breaching the walls after the defenders had exhausted their ammunition. A massacre of the city's 20,000 inhabitants ensued. Even the city's pigs, regarded as unclean by Muslims, were killed, and only women and boys who were captured to be sold as slaves were spared. A combined Christian fleet of 200 vessels, composed of Venetian (under Girolamo Zane), Papal (under Marcantonio Colonna), and Neapolitan/Genoese/Spanish (under Giovanni Andrea Doria) squadrons that had belatedly been assembled at Crete by late August and was sailing towards Cyprus, turned back when it received news of Nicosia's fall.

There is a famous story about enslavement during the Ottoman conquest. After the conquest of Nicosia Arnaude de Rocas was taken to the central square where she joined about 800 other young Cypriot women who were also bound for enslavement in Turkey. The women were loaded onto a ship at the port of Limassol, Cyprus. The ship was scheduled to sail the next day for Constantinople, modern day Istanbul, Turkey. During the night, however, the entire vessel exploded killing everyone on board including the young women who had all, it is reported, chosen death rather than slavery. Arnaude is credited with causing the explosion by using a lamp to set fire to the ship's powder store as the guards slept.

After the siege of Famagusta, as many as 20,000 members of the garrison and citizens of the city were massacred; 2,000 boys were spared to be sent as sexual slaves to Constantinople.

==== Austria ====
During the Siege of Vienna in 1529, the Ottoman troops pillaged the countryside around Vienna and took many surviving civilians as slaves. Peter Stern von Labach described it:

"After the taking of Bruck on the Leitha and the castle of Trautmannsdorf, the Sackman and those who went before him, people who have no regular pay, but live by plunder and spoil, to the number of 40,000, spread themselves far and wide over the country, as far as the Ens and into Styria, burning and slaying. Many thousands of people were murdered, or maltreated and dragged into slavery. Children were cut out of their mothers' wombs and stuck on pikes; young women abused to death, and their corpses left on the highway. God rest their souls, and grant vengeance on the bloodhounds who committed this evil."

Approximately 20,000 persons are estimated to have been captured and kidnapped into slavery, of which few ever returned: the Ottomans reportedly preferred young boys and girls and members of the clergy.

The atrocities was repeated during the second Siege of Vienna of 1683. In the village of Perchtoldsdorf outside of Vienna a massacre took place in which the Ottomans massacred the men of the village while the women and children were taken in to slavery. Perchtoldsdorf had resisted the invasion and barricaded themselves in the church fortress of the village, but agreed to surrender when the Ottomans promised them safety of their lives and property in exchange for capitulation. After capitulation, however, the Ottomans gathered the men of the village in the market square, took their weapons and massacred them, after which the women and children were taken prisoners and as kafir war prisoners taken away as slaves.

Normally, the Ottomans killed adult men and preferred to enslave women and children, but men were enslaved as well. In total, 57,220 people were kidnapped and taken away as slaves during the Ottoman pillage of the Austrian and Hungarian border zone in 1683; 6,000 men, 11,215 married women, 14,922 unmarried women under the age of 26 (of which 204 were noblewomen); and 26,093 children.

==== Hungary ====
After the Battle of Mohács (1526), the Ottoman army pillaged Hungary on the way to Budapest, during which men were massacred and women captured, raped and sold as slaves.

After the final Ottoman conquest of Hungary in 1541, there were frequent border raids by Ottoman and Crimean-Tartar troops toward Christian border lands, during which civilian were killed or captured, marched away and sold in the slave markets of Istanbul and Sarajevo.

Between 1522 and 1717, Tatars, soldiers from the Crimean Khanate, often participated in the Ottoman campaigns in the Hungarian border zones, and during these campaigns the tatars often captured slaves in Hungary and Austria; the long way back to the Crimea did provide opportunity for prisoners to escape, but many were abducted to Crimea, where they were either ransomed (if they were rich), or (if they were poor) sold on the Crimean slave trade.

==== Italy ====
A total of 12,000 were killed and 5,000 were enslaved during the Ottoman conquest of Otranto in September 1481, including victims from the territories of the Salentine Peninsula around the city, and the cathedral was turned into a mosque.

In the night of 8–9 August 1534, the town of Fondi was attacked by the corsair Barbarossa, who was seeking to kidnap Giulia Gonzaga and deliver her to Suleiman the Magnificent. Barbarossa had been ordered to kidnap (enslave) her by Ibrahim Pasha, the Ottoman Grand Vizier. Pasha's plan was to add her to the sultan's Ottoman Imperial Harem (as a slave concubine) and supplant Roxelana, the sultan's wife. She escaped, and Barbarossa, frustrated, massacred the populations of Fondi and nearby Sperlonga, though he was repulsed at nearby Itri. She fled into the night, accompanied by a single knight.

In 1558, Reggio was sacked by Dragut and most of its inhabitants were taken as slaves to Ottoman Tripoli.

==== Malta ====
The Ottomans attacked Hospitaller Malta several times in the 16th and 17th centuries, while the Barbary corsairs raided the Maltese Islands on many occasions between the 16th and the early 18th centuries. At the time, the Knights Hospitaller who ruled Malta were in a state of perpetual war against the Ottomans, and the capture of inhabitants as slaves was a regular occurrence during these attacks. Maltese shipping was also frequently attacked by the Ottomans and Barbary corsairs, while Muslim ships and coastal targets were themselves targets of the Hospitaller fleet and Malta-based corsairs; the enslavement of crewmembers and passengers was a routine occurrence on both sides.

During the 16th century, the Maltese island of Gozo was particularly vulnerable to Ottoman and corsair raids, and there are records of it being raided in 1533, 1540, 1541, 1544, 1545, 1546, 1547 and 1550. Ottoman corsair Dragut led several of these raids, including the 1540 raid in which 50 Gozitans were enslaved. In July 1551, an Ottoman fleet which was on its way to capture Tripoli from the Hospitallers launched a major attack on Gozo, sacked its fortress, and captured between 5,000 and 7,000 people – the majority of the island's population – as slaves. The captives were initially taken to North Africa, and there are records of some being sold in Tajura. According to tradition, some enslaved Gozitans were taken to Tarhuna in modern Libya, where they and their descendants converted to Islam and assimilated into the local population.

After the capture of Tripoli, the majority of the Gozitan slaves were taken to Constantinople. Many of the adult men are believed to have ended up as galley slaves. A number of surviving court cases and other records from the 1550s and 1560s make reference to Gozitan slaves in the Ottoman capital, including some who were eventually freed or ransomed, some who converted to Islam, and others who died in slavery. It is believed that the majority never returned to the Maltese Islands, and it took around a century of resettlement for Gozo's population to recover.

After the 1551 depopulation, other corsair raids on Gozo occurred in 1560, 1563, 1572, 1574, 1583, 1598 and 1599; during the 18 October 1583 raid, Rabat was sacked and 70 people were taken as slaves by corsairs from Bizerte in Ottoman Tunisia. The last major Ottoman attack on the Maltese Islands was a raid on southern Malta in July 1614, when an Ottoman fleet landed at Marsaskala Bay and proceeded to pillage the area around Żejtun before being repelled by a Maltese and Hospitaller militia. Although Christian sources specifically state that "no one of the Christians was captured", Turkish sources reportedly mention that some Maltese were enslaved during this raid. The frequency of corsair raids on Malta decreased significantly by the mid-17th century, but the threat continued and smaller-scale raids occurred until as late as 1733.

The state of perpetual war ended with the French occupation of Malta in 1798, after which Muslims who had been enslaved in Malta were freed. In turn, many Maltese who were enslaved in Ottoman territories were also freed, with 66 Maltese slaves being freed from Tunisia in 1798, 250 from Algeria in 1801, and 200 from Constantinople in 1802.

==== Serbia ====
When the First Serbian Uprising ended in defeat of the rebellion by the Ottomans, the Ottoman recapture of Belgrade in October 1813 became a scene of brutal revenge, with hundreds of its citizens massacred, and thousands sold into slavery as far away as Asia, followed by the abolition of all Serbian institutions.

==== Greece ====
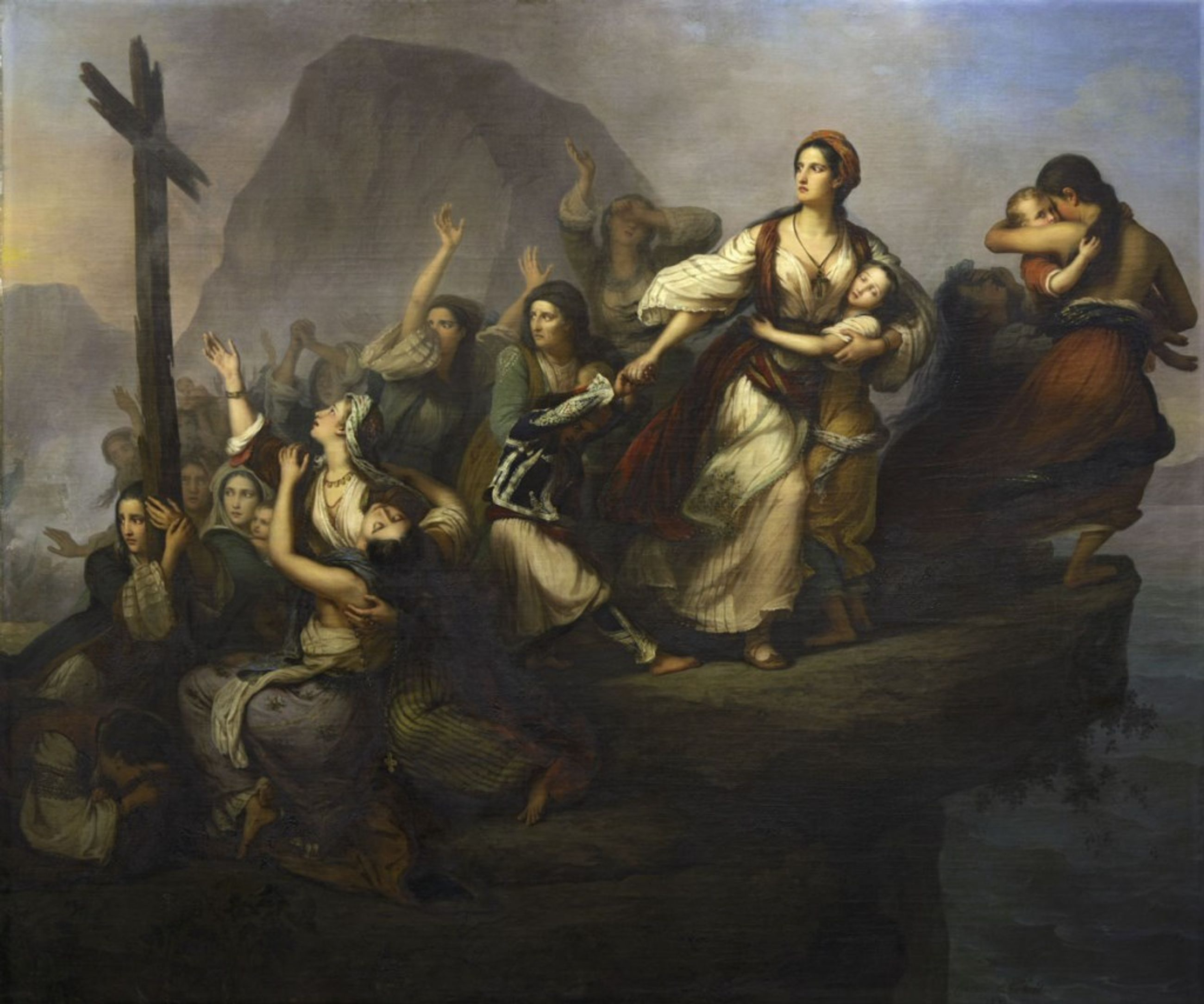
Greek Women of Souli Running to Their Death, depicting the Dance of Zalongo of 1803, in which Greek women were said to have committed mass suicide to escape being taken as slaves by the Ottomans.

During the Greek War of Independence (1821–1829), the Ottoman practiced wide scale enslavement of Greeks. This was done in accordance with the law of prisoners of war in Islam, when they were kafir from Dar a-harb, which was the case with Christian Greeks in rebellion against the Muslim Caliphate Empire during the Greek War of Independence.

In Naousa massacre on April 1822, male prisoners were killed while women and children were enslaved and sold. During another massacre in the predominantly Greek town of Ayvalik, the town was burned to the ground, for fear that the inhabitants might rebel and join the revolution in Greece; as a result, hundreds of Greeks were killed and many of the survivors were sold for slavery in the Ottoman Empire.

The massacre of Samothrace was the mass murder and enslavement of the Greek population of the island of Samothrace. Following the outbreak of the Greek War of Independence, the Samothracians rose in revolt against the local Ottoman authorities. On 1 September 1821, an Ottoman punitive expedition under the Castellan of Dardanelles Mehmet Pasha arrived at the island. After suppressing the uprising, the Ottoman troops killed or enslaved most of island's population. Ottoman losses amounted to 23 soldiers killed, including their standard-bearer and 32 wounded. Upon conquering Chora, the Ottomans descended into other populated areas and began to systematically massacre almost everyone they encountered, while enslaving others (mainly children) who were destined to be sold at Constantinople's and Smyrna's slave markets. The Ottomans looted the villages and took away the cattle before setting them aflame. Twelve people were hanged from the masts of the Ottoman ships in order to instill fear in the survivors. Those who managed to escape sought refuge in the mountains. The Ottomans employed a turncoat named Kyriakos who convinced many of the survivors that they would be amnestied. The Ottomans enslaved the women and children and brought approximately 700 men underneath a Byzantine fortress at Efka where they were massacred.

In the Kasos massacre on June 1824, of the Kasiot men, 500 were slain, and over 2,000 women and children were captured; a small number was bought back by their relatives, while the rest were sent to the slave markets of Egypt and Crete.

As a result of the invasion and Destruction of Psara on 10 Jun 1824, 17,000 Greeks were killed or sold as slaves.

An occasion which attracted particular attention were the large-scale enslavement of the Greek population on Chios after the Chios massacre of 1822. This incident attracted great attention in Europe and gave the Ottoman Empire bad publicity. It ultimately resulted in the first anti-slavery reform, the Firman of 1830, which decreed the manumission of the Greek war prisoners.

=== Tributary slaves ===
Greeks paid a land tax and a heavy tax on trade, the latter taking advantage of the wealthy Greeks to fill the state coffers. The non-Muslim citizens of the Ottoman Empire, were made to pay the jizya, or Islamic poll-tax which all non-Muslims in the empire were forced to pay instead of the Zakat that Muslims must pay as part of the 5 pillars of Islam. Failure to pay the jizya could result in the pledge of protection of the Christian's life and property becoming void, facing the alternatives of conversion, enslavement, or death.

As had been the case in many empires before, the Ottoman Empire also practiced tributary slavery. The most famous "tribute of children" was that of the boys, an enslavement known as devshirme, by which non-Muslim boys where enslaved as children, forcibly converted to Islam and raised to serve as slave soldiers. However, this was not the only form of tributary slavery in the Ottoman Empire. Christian Greek girls were also taken in order to serve as odalisques in harems.

==== Circassia ====
Slaves given as tributes played a part in the Crimean slave trade and the following Circassian slave trade of the Black Sea. Some of the slaves trafficked via the Black Sea slave trade were supplied to it as tributes. This was particularly the case of the Circassians. Some of the Circassian slaves were serfs and slaves to Circassian princes, who in their capacity as vassals to the Crimean khans as well as the Ottomans as tributes. These tributary slaves were then trafficked via the Black Sea slave trade.

The Crimean Khan regarded the Circassians tribal princes as their vassals, defined them as infidels and thus viewed them as legitimate targets for slave tributes for the Crimean Khanate as well as the Ottoman Empire, as well as punitive slave raid expeditions in collaboration with Ottoman troops. The Circassian elite gradually converted to Islam between the 16th and 18th centuries, and were therefore able to participate themselves in the raids for slave tributes performed by the Crimean-Ottoman against other Circassians.

The Crimean Khan received 12 percent of the price for every slave sold in the Crimean slave trade. A fifth of the captives were gifted from the Crimean Khan to the Ottoman sultan as a vassal tribute, since the Khan was formally the vassal of the Sultan; another share was divided between the Crimean-Tatar tribal aristocracy as field slaves, the Khan's officials and the Nogai-Tatars as slave-shepherds, and the final share was sold, either in the domestic Crimean markets of Bakhchisarai, Karaseibazar and Evpatoria, or in Kaffa, from where they were exported to the rest of the Ottoman Empire. Slaves trafficked from the Crimean slave trade could be sold far away in the Mediterranean and the Middle East; a Convent in Sinai in Egypt is for example noted to have bought a male slave originating from Kozlov in Russia.

==== Devshirme ====
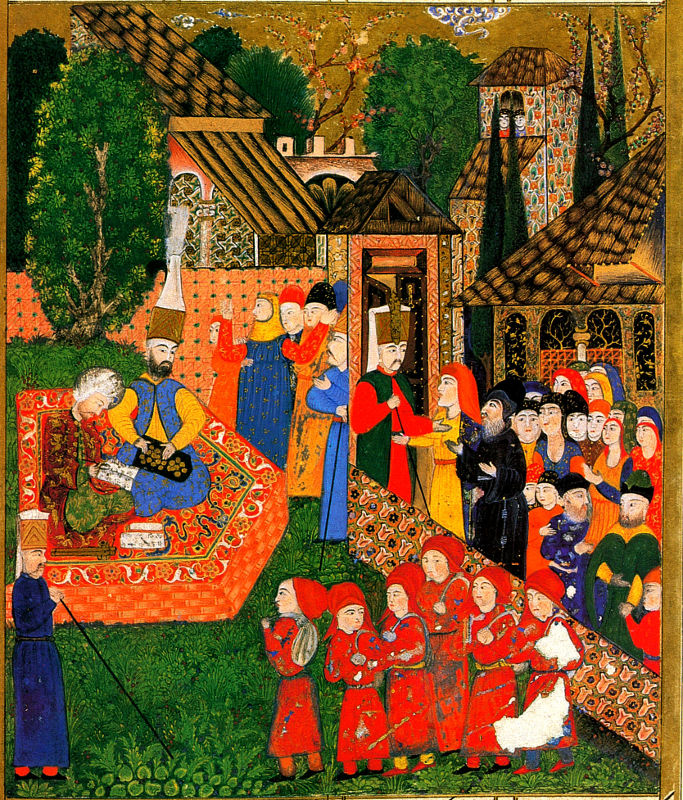
An Ottoman painting of Balkan children taken as soldier-slaves, or janissaries.

In the devşirme, which connotes "draft", "blood tax" or "child collection", young Christian boys from the Balkans and Anatolia were taken from their homes and families, forcibly converted to Islam, and enlisted into the most famous branch of the Kapıkulu, the janissaries. Most of the military commanders of the Ottoman forces, imperial administrators, and de facto rulers of the Empire, such as Sokollu Mehmed Pasha, were recruited in this way. By 1609, the Sultan's Kapıkulu forces increased to about 100,000.

==== Georgia ====
During the early modern age, the Georgian kingdoms were tributary states of the Ottoman Empire, to whom it gave slave tributes, and subjected to slave raids by warfaring mountain tribes to such a degree that the population of Eastern Georgia had decreased to the numerous slave raids.

The diplomatic Ottoman–Georgian relations were dominated by slave tributes from the Georgians to the Ottomans. The Georgian monarchs had weak control over their kingdoms, where local noblemen ruled their own provinces and paid regular tributes of slaves from their serf population to the Ottoman Empire, as diplomatic gifts in exchange for Ottoman military protection. The convert Georgian-Ottoman official Ahmed Pasha of Akhaltsikhe (died 1758) participated in the Ottoman expansion of the Caucasus and determined the annual quote of slaves from Georgia. Ahmed Pasha of Akhaltsikhe was defeated by Solomon I in 1757. After his defeat of the Ottoman troops in Western Georgia at at Khresili on 14 December 1757, King Solomon I formally banned the slave trade in 1759.

In June 1768, King Solomon I appealed to Catherine II of Russia as the "universal mother of all Orthodox Christian countries" to aid him in defending his kingdom against the Ottoman Empire, liberate his citizens that had been enslaved by the Ottomans and provide his army with weapons. In September 1769, King Erekle II appealed to Catherine II of Russia for military intervention to help him liberate his citizens who had been enslaved in the Eastern Ottoman Empire. King Erekle II opposed the slave trade of the merchants as well as the nobility and also attempted to fight the slave raids in to Georgia. In Articles XXII and XXV of the 1774 Treaty of Kuchuk Kainardji between Russia and the Ottoman Empire, the Ottoman Empire was forced to promise to stop demanding tributes of slave children from Georgia, and to allow war captives and enslaved civilians to return to their whom countries without being bought free by a ransom. In the 1783 Treaty of Georgievsk, Eastern Georgia was given protection from Russia instead of Iran, and the tributes of Georgian slave children were stopped. When the slave tributes from Georgia stopped, the Ottoman Empire retaliated by a punitive slave raid in to Georgia which took numerous captives for enslavement.

== Rules and conditions ==
=== Slavery laws ===
Slavery was regulated by the Seriat, the religious Islamic Law, and by the secular Sultan's law Kanun, which was essentially supplementary regulations to facilitate the implementation of the Seriat law.

Slaves could become legally enslaved through direct capture in warfare; acquired via a middle man trade network (essentially foreign slave merchants), or by being born in to slavery, which meant both of their parents or their only known parent was a slave; however, there were also illegally acquired slaves.

Islamic Law allowed for Muslims to enslave non-Muslims, unless they were zimmis (protected minorities who had accepted Muslim rule), and slaves were therefore non-Muslims imported from non-Muslim lands outside of the Empire. By Islamic law, foreign non-Muslims (kafirs) were by definition legitimate targets for enslavement, since the Muslim world of dar al-islam was by definition at war with the non-Muslim world of dar al-harb ("House of War").

While Muslims could only enslave non-Muslims, the conversion of a non-Muslim slave to Islam after their enslavement did not require the enslaver to manumit his slave.

A Muslim man was allowed by law to have sexual intercourse with his female slave, though not with a slave who was legally owned by his wife. The child of a slave was born a slave, unless the male slave owner acknowledged the child of his female slave as his, in which case the child would be automatically free by law. If he chose to acknowledge his child with his slave, then the slave mother herself would become an umm al-walad and free when her enslaver died, though she continued to be a slave during his lifetime.

It was difficult for a runaway slave to hide and survive in Ottoman society, which was a society with tight social control where everyone knew each other. Runaway slaves who were caught and not able to present proof of their free status, would be kept in arrest by the kadi, who kept them for three months and, unless their enslaver had appeared to collect them, would have them sold on the slave market.

To manumit a slave was described as a good act, and often practiced to be forgiven of sins at the close of death of the slave owner. Former slaves normally had little choice but to continue to work for their former owners, since there were few opportunities for them after manumission. If the slaves did leave their former owners, they rarely had any other choice but to rely on private charities which were established in some cities; such organizations were often managed by Europeans, but in Constantinople, there was a society of former female slaves known as godyas who offered assistance to manumitted slaves.

=== Racial dimension ===
Since all non-Muslims outside of Muslim lands were legitimate targets of enslavement, there were slaves of different races. Officially, there were no difference made between slaves of difference races, but in practice, white slaves were given the highest status, with Ethiopians second and fully black African slaves given the lowest status among slaves. Enslaved people were sold for different prices depending on their race, and were considered to have different ability, and be suitable for different tasks, because of their race and ethnicity.

The Ottoman Empire kept genders segregated in the harems and concubines were not allowed to leave the harem. Men, aside from the male head of the household, were forbidden to enter the harem. However, eunuchs were allowed to move freely inside and outside the harem and acted as protectors of the women. This position gave eunuchs the ability to have access to the ruler's living quarters. A common consequence of this segregation of the ruler from the rest of the house while in the harem, gave eunuchs the role of message bearers. During the course of the Harem, racial segregation became common between eunuchs. Slave traders of white circassian slaves enjoyed more business clout due to the inflated value of whiteness that existed during the Ottoman Empire.

While African slave girls were used as maidservants as well as for sexual services, white slave girls were primarily used as concubines (sex slaves) and were more expensive. The preference of white girls over African girls as sex slaves was noted by the international press, when the slave market was flooded by white girls in the 1850s due to the Circassian genocide, which resulted in the price for white slave girls to become cheaper and Muslim men who were not able to buy white girls before now exchanged their black slave women for white ones. The New York Daily Times reported on August 6, 1856:

In former times a "good middling" Circassian girl was thought very cheap at 100 pounds, but at the present moment the same description of goods may be had for 5 pounds! [...] Formerly a Circassian slave girl was pretty sure of being bought into a good family, where not only good treatment, but often rank and fortune awaited her; but at present low rates she may be taken by any huxter who never thought of keeping a slave before. Another evil is that the temptation to possess a Circassian girl at such low prices is so great in the minds of the Turks that many who cannot afford to keep several slaves have been sending their blacks to market, in order to make room for a newly-purchased white girl. The consequence is that numbers of black women, after being as many as eight or ten years in the same hands, have lately been consigned to the broker for disposal. Not a few of those wretched creatures are in a state quite unfit for being sold. I have it on the authority of a respectable slave-broker that at the present moment there have been thrown on the market unusually large numbers of negresses in the family way, some of them even slaves of pashas and men of rank. He finds them so unsalable that he has been obliged to decline receiving any more. A single observation will explain the reason of this, which might appear strange when compared with the value that is attached even to an unborn black baby in some slave countries. In Constantinople it is evident that there is a very large number of negresses living and having habitual intercourse with their Turkish masters—yet it is a rare thing to see a mulatto. What becomes of the progeny of such intercourse? I have no hesitation in saying that it is got rid of by infanticide, and that there is hardly a family in Stanboul where infanticide is not practiced in such cases as a mere matter of course, and without the least remorse or dread.

African slave girls, who were often bought for both sexual use as well as house slaves, were typically sold for between 1500 and 2500 kurus, while white slave girls were sold for 3000 if they were bought for use as house slaves, or for anything above 6,000 if they were sold for sexual use as concubines; in at least one documented case for as much as 88.000 kurus.

=== Slave traders ===
The Ottoman slave traders were sorted by professional guilds. The slave guilds were categorized by the category of slaves sold. The slave merchants who traded in white slaves were given a higher status: white slaves were viewed as luxury possessions and sold for higher prices, and dealers in white slaves were consequently more wealthy, catered to rich clients, and given highest professional status than slave traders who specialized in black African slaves. In Cairo, for example, slave merchants who dealt in white slaves were (in contrast to their colleagues) allowed to join prestigious merchant guilds.

=== Market sale ===
Slaves were traded in special marketplaces called "Esir" or "Yesir" that were located in most towns and cities, central to the Ottoman Empire. It is said that Sultan Mehmed II "the Conqueror" established the first Ottoman slave market in Constantinople in the 1460s, probably where the former Byzantine slave market had stood. According to Nicolas de Nicolay, there were slaves of all ages and both sexes, most were displayed naked to be thoroughly checked – especially children and young women – by possible buyers.

=== Prices and taxes ===
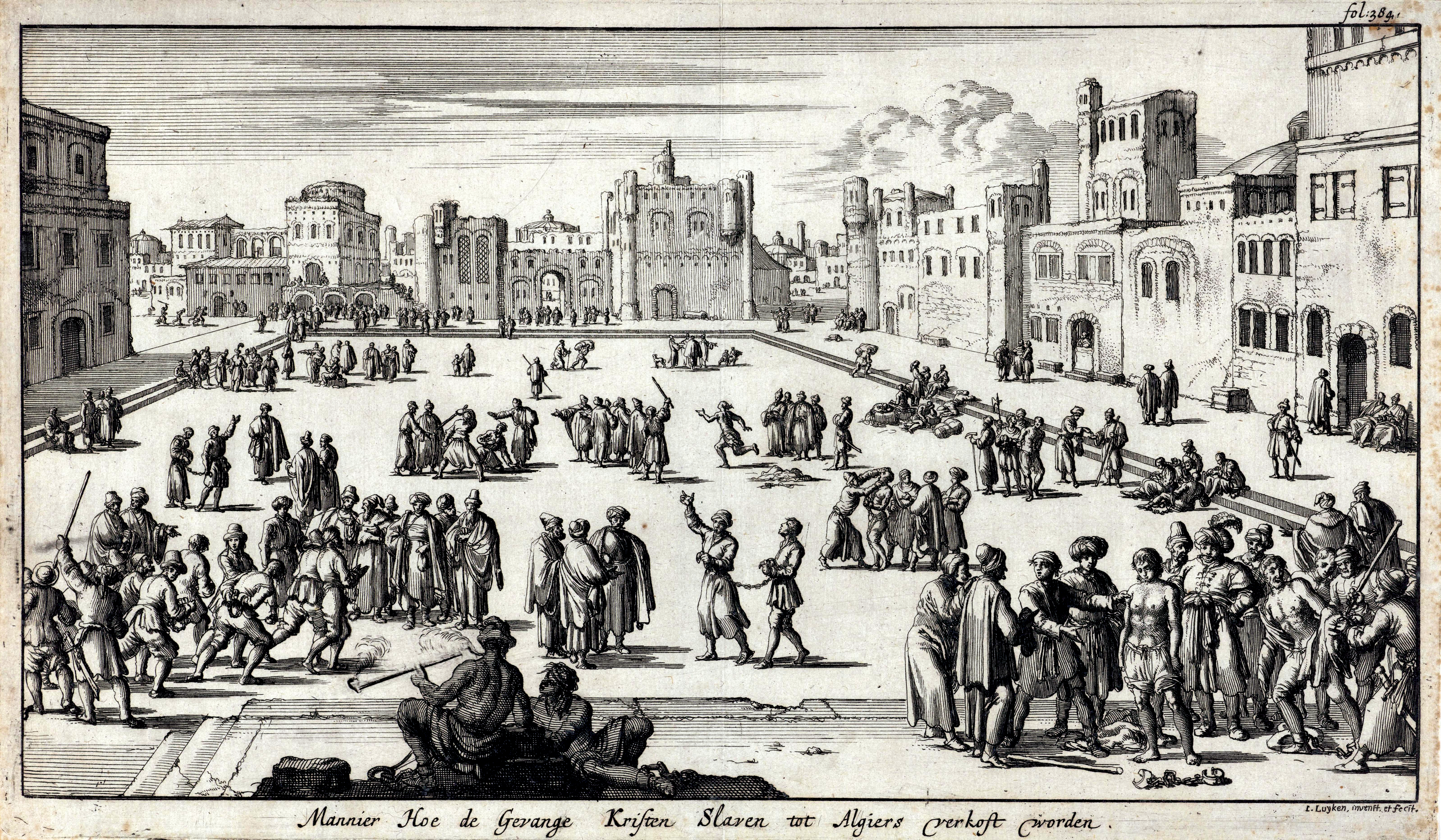
Slave market with Europeans being sold in Algiers, Ottoman Algeria, 1684

A study of the slave market of Ottoman Crete produces details about the prices of slaves. Factors such as age, race, virginity, etc. significantly influenced prices.

The most expensive slaves were those between 10 and 35 years of age, with the highest prices for European virgin girls 13–25 years of age and teenage boys. The cheaper slaves were those with disabilities and sub-Saharan Africans. Prices in Crete ranged between 65 and 150 "esedi guruş" (see Kuruş). But even the lowest prices were affordable to only high income persons. For example, in 1717 a 12-year-old boy with mental disabilities was sold for 27 guruş, an amount that could buy in the same year 462 kg (1,019 lb) of lamb meat, 933 kg (2,057 lb) of bread or 1,385 L (366 US gal) of milk. In 1671 a female slave was sold in Crete for 350 guruş, while at the same time the value of a large two-floor house with a garden in Chania was 300 guruş.

There were various taxes to be paid on the importation and selling of slaves. One of them was the "pençik" or "penç-yek" tax, literally meaning "one fifth". This taxation was based on verses of the Quran, according to which one fifth of the spoils of war belonged to God, to the Prophet and his family, to orphans, to those in need and to travelers. The Ottomans probably started collecting pençik at the time of Sultan Murad I (1362–1389). Pençik was collected both in money and in kind, the latter including slaves as well. Tax was not collected in some cases of war captives. With war captives, slaves were given to soldiers and officers as a motive to participate in war.

The recapture of runaway slaves was a job for private individuals called "yavacis". Whoever managed to find a runaway enslaved person seeking their freedom would collect a fee of "good news" from the yavaci and the latter took this fee plus other expenses from the slaves' master. Slaves could also be rented, inherited, pawned, exchanged or given as gifts.

== Slave market and the function of slaves ==
Slaves were used for a number of different roles and tasks within the Ottoman Empire. There was an informal racial hierarchy among slaves. White male slaves were often used for potentially influential positions as military slaves. White female slaves were preferred by wealthy men as harem concubines, while black female slaves were used as maidservants or domestic laborers.

=== Agricultural laborers ===
On the basis of a list of estates belonging to members of the ruling class kept in Edirne between 1545 and 1659, the following data was collected: out of 93 estates, 41 had slaves. The total number of slaves in the estates was 140; 54 female and 86 male. 134 of them bore Muslim names, 5 were not defined, and 1 was a Christian woman. Some of these slaves appear to have been employed on farms. In conclusion, the ruling class, because of extensive use of warrior slaves and because of its own high purchasing capacity, was undoubtedly the single major group keeping the slave market alive in the Ottoman Empire.

Rural slavery was largely a phenomenon endemic to the Caucasus region, which was carried to Anatolia and Rumelia after the Circassian migration in 1864.

=== Eunuchs ===
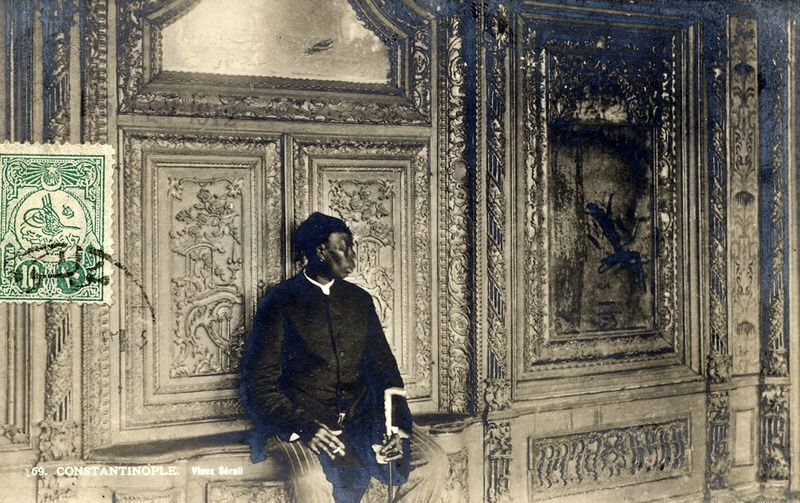
Chief Eunuch of Ottoman Sultan Abdul Hamid II at the Imperial Palace, 1912

During the slavery in the Ottoman Empire, eunuchs were typically slaves imported from outside their domains. A fair proportion of male slaves were imported as eunuchs.

The Ottoman court harem—within the Topkapı Palace (1465–1853) and later the Dolmabahçe Palace (1853–1909) in Istanbul—was under the administration of the eunuchs. These were of two categories: black eunuchs and white eunuchs. Black eunuchs were slaves from sub-Saharan Africa via the Trans-Saharan slave trade, the Red Sea slave trade or the Indian Ocean slave trade, who served the concubines and officials in the Harem together with chamber maidens of low rank.

The white eunuchs were slaves from the Balkans or the Caucasus, either purchased in the slave markets or taken as boys from Christian families in the Balkans who were unable to pay the jizya tax. They served the recruits at the Palace School and were from 1582 prohibited from entering the Harem. An important figure in the Ottoman court was the Chief Black Eunuch (Kızlar Ağası or Darüssaade Ağası). In control of both the harem and a net of spies among the black eunuchs, the Chief Eunuch was involved in almost every palace intrigue and thereby could gain power over either the sultan or one of his viziers, ministers, or other court officials.

One of the most powerful Chief Eunuchs was Beshir Agha in the 1730s, who played a crucial role in establishing the Ottoman version of Hanafi Islam throughout the Empire by founding libraries and schools.

=== Military slavery ===
In the mid-14th century, Murad I built an army of slaves, referred to as the Kapıkulu. The new force was based on the sultan's right to a fifth of the war booty, which he interpreted to include captives taken in battle. The captives were trained in the sultan's personal service.

The devşirme system could be considered a form of slavery because the Sultans had absolute power over them. However, as the 'servant' or 'kul' of the sultan, they had high status within the Ottoman society because of their training and knowledge. They could become the highest officers of the state and the military elite, and most recruits were privileged and remunerated. Though ordered to cut all ties with their families, a few succeeded in dispensing patronage at home. Christian parents might thus implore, or even bribe, officials to take their sons. Indeed, Bosnian and Albanian Muslims successfully requested their inclusion in the system.

=== Sexual slavery ===
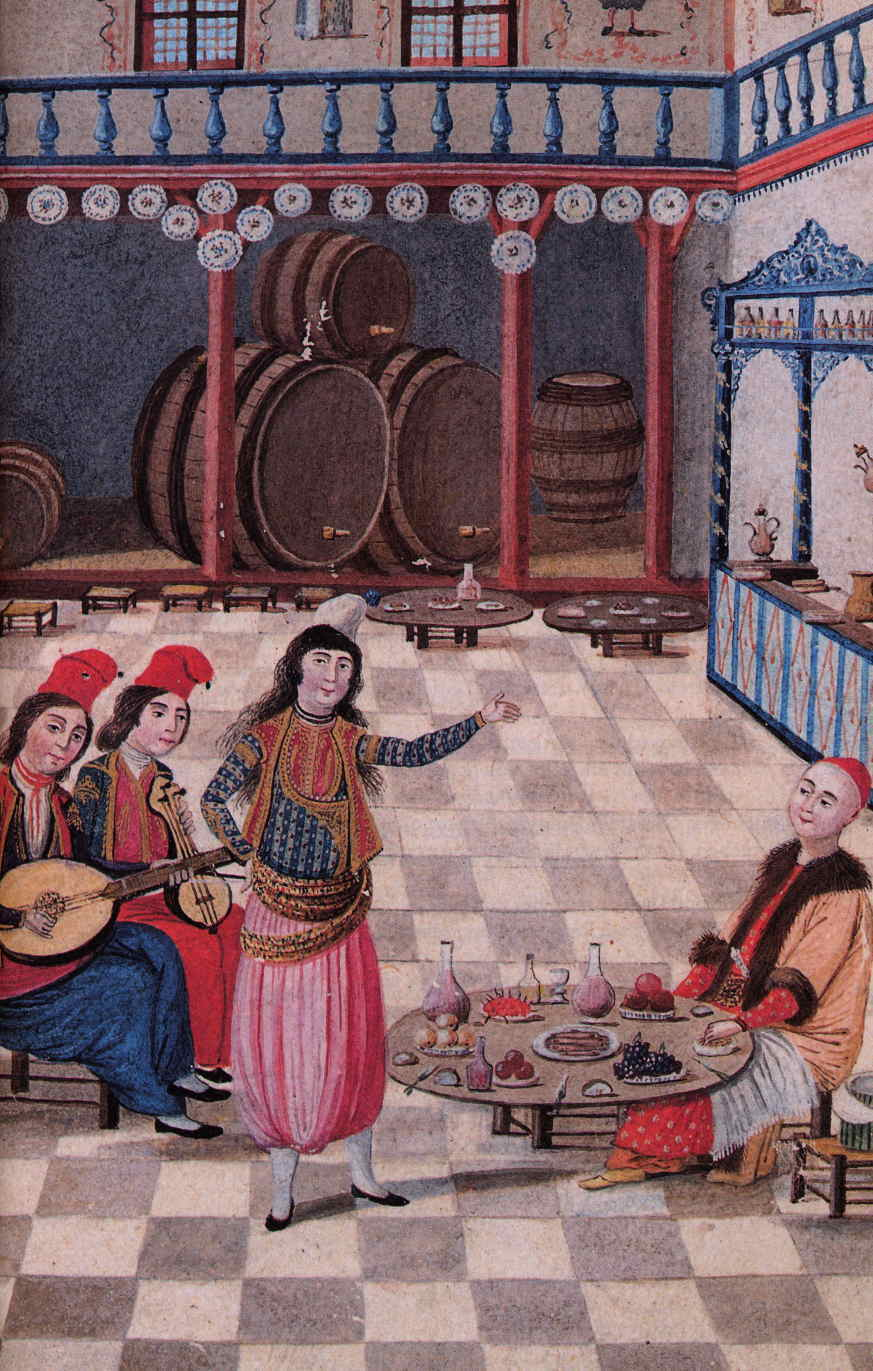
"Performing Köçek", illustration from Hubanname by Enderûnlu Fâzıl, 18th century

In the Ottoman Empire, female slaves owned by men were sexually available to their masters, and their children, if acknowledged by their owners, were considered as legitimate as any child born of a free woman. This means that any child of a female slave could not be sold or given away. However female slaves owned by women could not be available to their masters' husband by law. However, due to extreme poverty, some Circassian slaves and free people in the lower classes of Ottoman society felt forced to sell their children into slavery; this provided a potential benefit for the children as well, as slavery also held the opportunity for social mobility. If a harem slave became pregnant and the owner acknowledged paternity, it also became illegal for her to be further sold in slavery, and she would gain her freedom upon her current owner's death.

Slavery in and of itself was long tied with the economic and expansionist activities of the Ottoman Empire. There was a major decrease in slave acquisition by the late eighteenth century as a result of the lessening of expansionist activities. War efforts were a great source of slave procurement, so the Ottoman Empire had to find other methods of obtaining slaves because they were a major source of income within the empire. The Caucasian War caused a major influx of Circassian slaves into the Ottoman market via the Circassian slave trade and a person of modest wealth could purchase a slave with a few pieces of gold. At a time, Circassian slaves became the most abundant in the imperial harem.

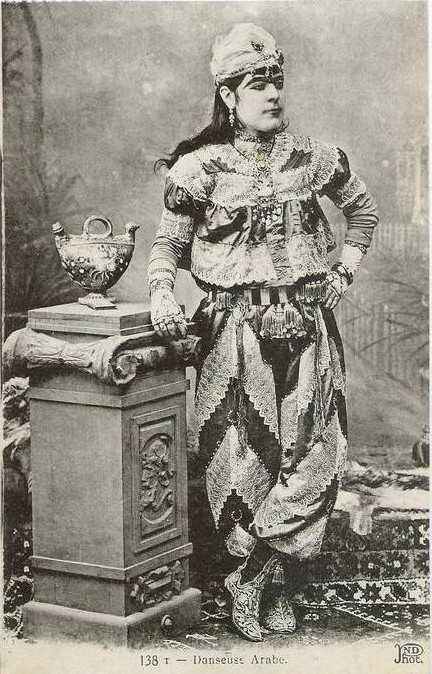
A 19th-century photograph of a Köçek, a cross-dressing young slave boy sometimes used for homosexual purposes

Throughout the 18th and 19th centuries, sexual slavery was not only central to Ottoman practice but a critical component of imperial governance and elite social reproduction. Boys could also become sexual slaves, though usually they worked in places like bathhouses (hammam) and coffeehouses. During this period, historians have documented men indulging in sexual behavior with other men and getting caught. Moreover, the visual illustrations during this period of exposing a sodomite being stigmatized by a group of people with Turkish wind instruments shows the disconnect between sexuality and tradition. However those that were accepted became tellaks (masseurs), köçeks (cross-dressing dancers) or sāqīs (wine pourers) for as long as they were young and beardless. The "Beloveds" were often loved by former Beloveds that were educated and considered upper class.

Some female slaves who were enslaved by women were sold as sex workers for short periods of time. Women also purchased slaves, but usually not for sexual purposes, and most likely searched for slaves who were loyal, healthy, and had good domestic skills. Beauty was also a valued trait when looking to buy a slave because they often were seen as objects to show off to people. While prostitution was against the law, there were very little recorded instances of punishment that came to shari'a courts for pimps, prostitutes, or for the people who sought out their services. Cases that did punish prostitution usually resulted in the expulsion of the prostitute or pimp from the area they were in. However, this does not mean that these people were always receiving light punishments. Sometimes military officials took it upon themselves to enforce extra judicial punishment. This involved pimps being strung up on trees, destruction of brothels, and harassing prostitutes.

In the Islamic world, sex outside of marriage was normally acquired by men not by paying for sex from a prostitute, but rather by a personal sex slave called concubine, which was a sex slave trade that was still ongoing until the 20th century.

Traditionally, prostitution in the Islamic world was historically practiced by way of the pimp temporarily selling his slave to her client, who then returned the ownership of the slave after intercourse. The Islamic Law formally prohibited prostitution. However, since Islamic Law allowed a man to have sexual intercourse with his personal sex slave, prostitution was practiced by a pimp selling his female slave on the slave market to a client, who returned his ownership of her after 1–2 days on the pretext of discontent after having had intercourse with her, which was a legal and accepted method for prostitution in the Islamic world. This form of prostitution was practiced by for example Ibn Batuta, who acquired several female slaves during his travels.

The Ottoman Imperial Harem was similar to a training institution for concubines, and served as a way to get closer to the Ottoman elite. Women from lower-class families had especially good opportunities for social mobility in the imperial harem because they could be trained to be concubines for high-ranking military officials. Concubines had an chance for even greater power in Ottoman society if they became favorites of the sultan. The sultan would keep a large number of girls as his concubines in the New Palace, which as a result became known as "the palace of the girls" in the sixteenth and seventeenth centuries. These concubines mainly consisted of young Christian slave girls. Accounts claim that the sultan would keep a concubine in the New Palace for a period of two months, during which time he would do with her as he pleased. They would be considered eligible for the sultan's sexual attention until they became pregnant; if a concubine became pregnant, the sultan might take her as a wife and move her to the Old Palace where they would prepare for the royal child; if she did not become pregnant by the end of the two months, she would be married off to one of the sultan's high-ranking military men. If a concubine became pregnant and gave birth to a daughter, she might still be considered for further sexual attention from the sultan. The harem system was an important part of Ottoman-Egyptian society as well; it attempted to mimic the imperial harem in many ways, including the secrecy of the harem section of the household, where the women were kept hidden away from males who were outside of their own family, the guarding of the women by black eunuchs, and also having the function of training for becoming concubines.

==== Sexual slavery in the Armenian genocide ====
Prior to the Armenian genocide, the Ottoman government had stressed the link between the payment of jizya and the protected status of the Armenian community. However, the appeal by Armenian leaders to outside powers prior to 1915, to press the Ottomans to make reforms for the Christians, was subsequently cited as a violation of their contract with the state, removing that protected status, including the protection from enslavement.

During the Armenian genocide, numerous Armenian women were raped and subjected to sexual slavery, with women forced into prostitution or forcibly married to non-Armenians, or sold as sex slaves to military officials. Kidnapped Armenian girls were sorted on the basis of their age, beauty and marital status. The "first choice" was given to high-level Ottoman officials. One German reported the sale of girls in Ras al-Ayn and testified that the policemen carried out the trade in girls. A few slave markets were set up in the vicinity of government buildings, while Armenian captive sex slaves were kept in the Red Crescent Hospital in Trebizond. Research has shown that Turkish women were often also complicit in the crimes perpetrated against Armenian women by assisting in selling them into sexual slavery.

=== Slaves in the Imperial Harem ===
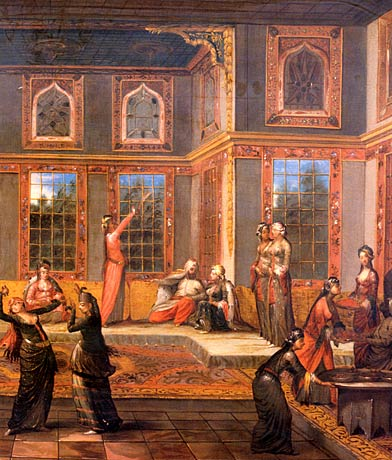
An 18th-century painting of the harem of Sultan Ahmed III, by Jean Baptiste Vanmour

Very little is actually known about the Imperial Harem, and much of what is thought to be known is actually conjecture and imagination. There are two main reasons for the lack of accurate accounts on this subject. The first was the barrier imposed by the people of the Ottoman society – the Ottoman people did not know much about the machinations of the Imperial Harem themselves, due to it being physically impenetrable, and because the silence of insiders was enforced. The second was that any accounts from this period were from European travelers, who were both not privy to the information, and also further distanced from the inner workings of the Royal Harem by virtue of being non-Muslim (kafir) foreigners. Despite this, scandalous stories of the Imperial Harem, and the sexual practices of the sultans there-in were popular, whether they originated from sensationalist claims or uncomfortable truths. Ibrahim, successor to Murad IV, inherited the throne in 1640 and famously squandered public funds to conduct massive orgies in the palace with such frequency that lurid stories of the sexual excesses of the sultanate became emblematic of dynastic life throughout the seventeenth century.

However, European accounts from captives who served as pages in the imperial palace, and the reports, dispatches, and letters of ambassadors resident in Istanbul, their secretaries, and other members of their suites offered more reliable insight than other, often religiously motivated European sources. And further, of this group, the writings of the Venetians in the sixteenth century are considered especially extensive in volume, comprehensiveness, sophistication, and accuracy.

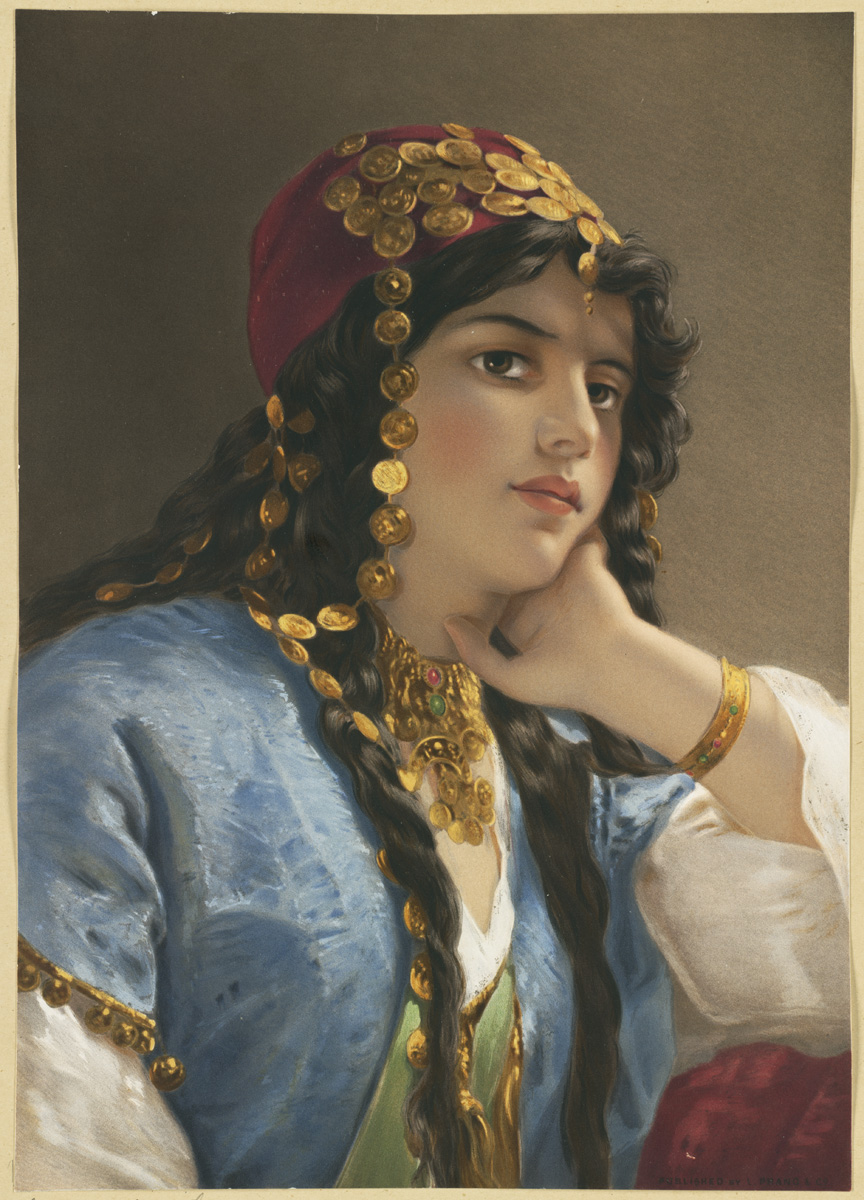
A "cariye" or imperial concubine, painting by Gustav Richter (1823–1884)

The concubines of the Ottoman Sultan consisted chiefly of purchased slaves. The Sultan's concubines were generally of Christian origin (usually European, Circassian, Abkhazian, or Georgian). Most of the elites of the Harem Ottoman Empire included many women, such as the sultan's mother, preferred concubines, royal concubines, children (princes/princess), and administrative personnel. The administrative personnel of the palace harem were made up of many high-ranking slave women officers, they were responsible for the training of Jariyes for domestic chores.

The mother of a sultan, though formally technically a slave, became free when the sultan died, in accordance with the umm al-walad rule for a slave woman who gave birth to a child acknowledged by her enslaver, and as the free mother of the sultan received the high-status title of valide sultan, which could offer her significant informal influence over the ruler of the empire (see Sultanate of Women). The mother of the sultan played a substantial role in decision-making for the Imperial Harem. One notable example was Kösem Sultan, daughter of a Greek Christian priest, who dominated the Ottoman Empire during the early decades of the 17th century. Roxelana (also known as Hürrem Sultan), another notable example, was the favorite wife of Suleiman the Magnificent. Many historians who study the Ottoman Empire rely on the factual evidence of observers of 16th- and 17th-century Islam. The tremendous growth of the harem institution reconstructed the careers and roles of women in the dynasty power structure. There were harem women who were the mothers, legal wives, Kalfas, and concubines of the Ottoman sultan. Only a small amount of these harem women were freed from slavery and married their spouses.

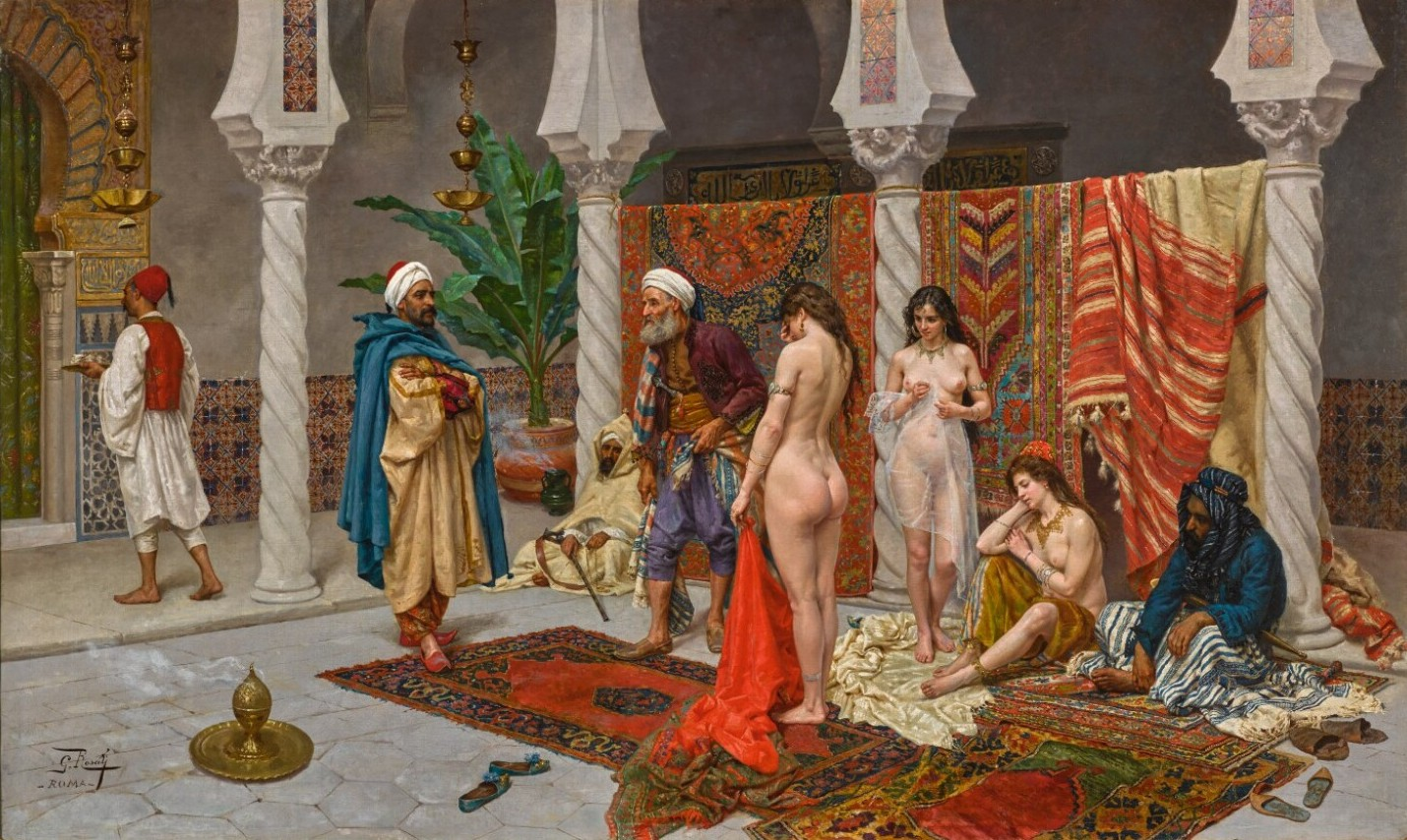
Giulio Rosati, Inspection of New Arrivals, 1858–1917, Circassian beauties

The concubines were guarded by enslaved eunuchs, often from pagan Africa. The eunuchs were headed by the Kizlar Agha ("agha of the [slave] girls"). While some interpretation of Islamic law forbade the emasculation of a man, Ethiopian Christians had no such compunctions; thus, they enslaved members of territories to the south and sold the resulting eunuchs to the Ottoman Porte. Henry G. Spooner claimed that Coptic priests at Abou Gerbe monastery in Upper Egypt participated extensively in the slave trade of eunuchs. Spooner stated that the Coptic priests sliced the penis and testicles off boys around the age of eight in a castration operation.

The eunuch boys were then sold in the Ottoman Empire. According to Spooner, the majority of Ottoman eunuchs endured castration at the hands of the Copts at Abou Gerbe monastery. Boys were captured from the African Great Lakes region and other areas in Sudan like Darfur and Kordofan, enslaved, then sold to customers in Egypt.

While the majority of eunuchs came from Africa, most white eunuchs were selected from the devshirme, Christian boys recruited from the Ottoman Balkans and Anatolian Greeks. Differently from the black eunuchs, who were castrated in their place of origin, they were castrated at the palace. (Note: "Making of Ottoman court eunuchs makes clear that white eunuchs could be recruited among devshirme boys, with the pages and their eunuch supervisors coming from the same background. They were sometimes castrated in the palace, whereas the harem's black eunuchs were more often castrated in their region of origin.") A number of eunuchs of devshirme origin went on to hold important positions in the Ottoman military and the government, such as grand viziers Hadım Ali Pasha, Sinan Borovinić, and Hadım Hasan Pasha.

== Decline and suppression of Ottoman slavery ==
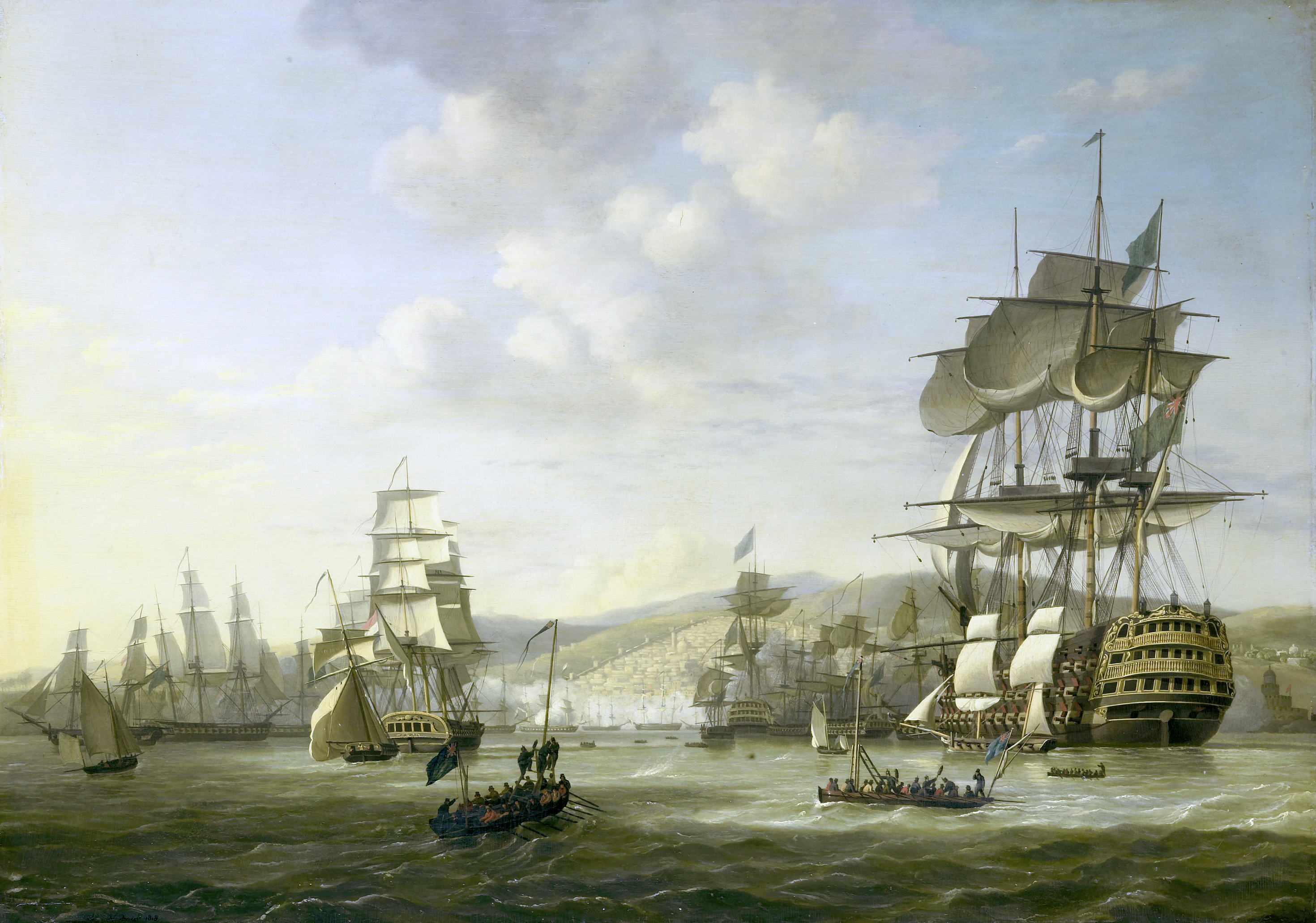
The bombardment of Algiers by the Anglo-Dutch fleet in support of an ultimatum to release European slaves, August 1816

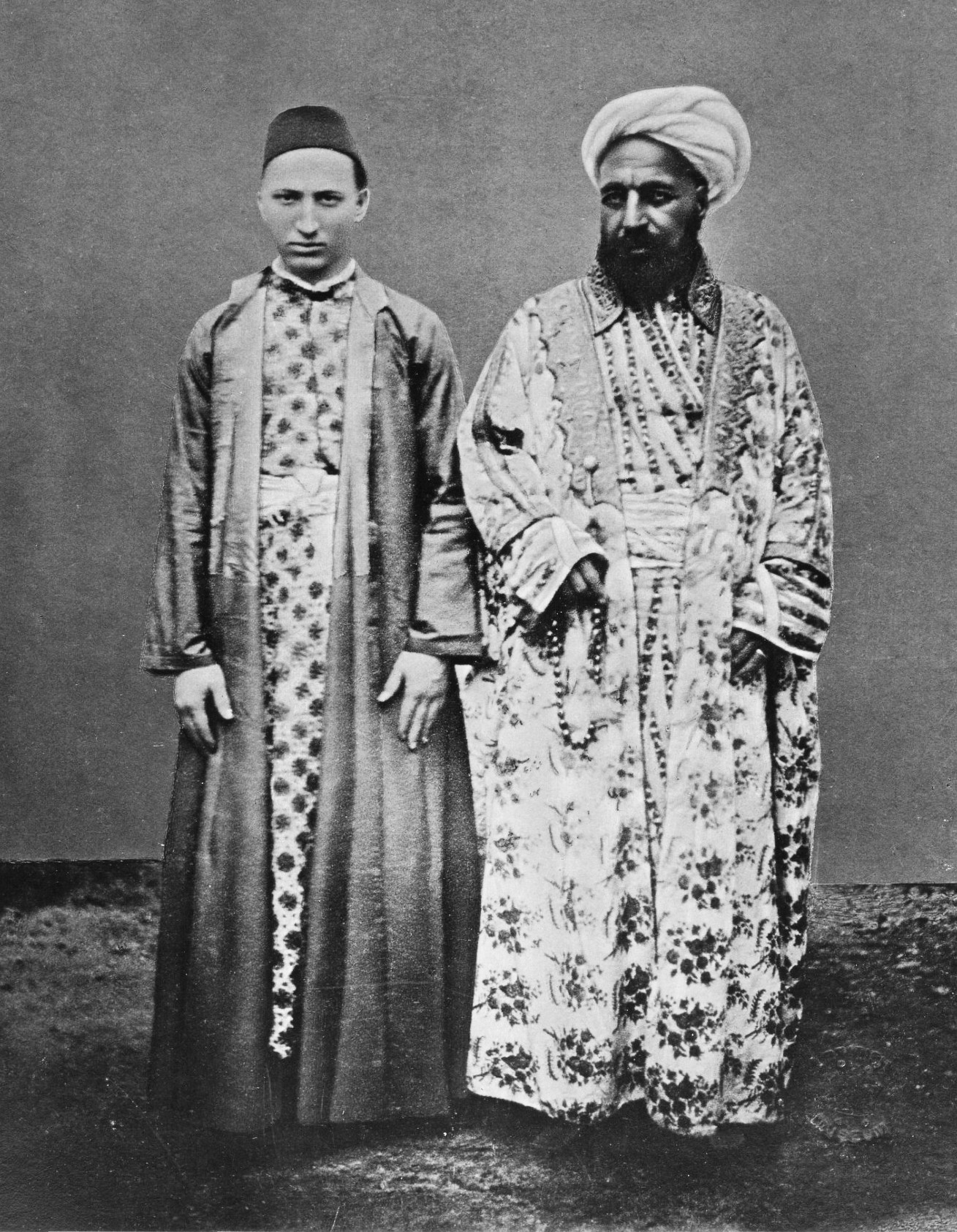
A Meccan slaveowner (right) and his Circassian slave. Entitled 'Vornehmer Kaufmann mit seinem cirkassischen Sklaven' [Distinguished merchant and his circassian slave] by Christiaan Snouck Hurgronje, ca. 1888.

From 1830 onward, the Ottoman Empire issued a number of reforms gradually restricting slavery and slave trade. Among the reforms representing the process of official abolition of slavery in the Ottoman Empire where the Firman of 1830, the Disestablishment of the Istanbul Slave Market (1847), the Suppression of the slave trade in the Persian Gulf (1847), the Prohibition of the Circassian and Georgian slave trade (1854–1855), the Prohibition of the Black Slave Trade (1857), and the Anglo-Ottoman Convention of 1880, followed by the Kanunname of 1889 and the excluding of slavery from the Constitution of 1908.

However, these reforms were mainly nominal. They were introduced for diplomatic reasons after pressure from the West, and in practice, both slavery and the slave trade were tolerated by the Ottoman Empire until the end of the Empire in the 20th century.

=== Decline and reforms ===
Responding to the influence and pressure of European countries in the 19th century, the Empire began taking steps to curtail the slave trade, which had been legally valid under Ottoman law since the beginning of the empire. One of the important campaigns against Ottoman slavery and slave trade was conducted in the Caucasus by the Russian authorities.

A series of decrees were promulgated that initially limited the slavery of white persons, and subsequently that of all races and religions. The Firman of 1830 of Sultan Mahmud II gave freedom to white slaves. This category included Circassians, who had the custom of selling their own children, enslaved Greeks who had revolted against the Empire in 1821, and some others. In practice, it concerned Greek captives enslaved during the Greek War of Independence, which had caused great attention in the West.

In 1847 the Disestablishment of the Istanbul Slave Market closed the open slave market in the Ottoman capital; a cosmetic reform, making the slave trade less visible to criticism by moving it indoors. The same year, the Suppression of the slave trade in the Persian Gulf nominally prohibited the import of African slaves via the route of the Persian Gulf to Ottoman territory. However, the ban was nominal.

The slave trade in primarily white girls intended for the harems attracted attention in the West. Attempting to suppress the practice, another firman abolishing the trade of Circassians and Georgians was issued in October 1854. The decree did not abolish slavery as such, only the import of new slaves. However, in March 1858, the Ottoman Governor of Trapezunt informed the British Consul that the 1854 ban had been a temporary war time ban due to foreign pressure, and that he had been given orders to allow slave ships on the Black Sea passage on their way to Constantinople, and in December formal tax regulations were introduced, legitimizing the Circassian slave trade again. The so-called Circassian slave trade was to continue until the 20th century. The sex slave trade in white girls for sexual slavery (concubinage) did not stop, and the British travel writer John Murray described a batch of white slave girls in the Middle East in the 1870s:

"Their complexion are sallow, and none of them [sic] are even good looking. But the daily Turkish bath, protection from the sun, and a wholesome diet, working upon and excellent constitution, accomplish wonders in a short space of time".

The West also started to pressure on the abolition in slaves from Africa. In 1857, British pressure resulted in the Ottoman Sultan issuing the Firman of 1857 that prohibited the slave trade from the Sudan to Ottoman Egypt and across the Red Sea to Ottoman Hijaz; however, the preceding firman of 1854 had already caused the Hejaz rebellion in the Hijaz Province and resulted in the slave trade in the Hijaz being exempted from the 1857 prohibition of the Red Sea slave trade and the prohibition remained nominal on paper only. The firman of 1857 did not ban slavery as such, nor did it ban slave trade: it merely banned the import of new slaves from foreign landa across the borders to the Ottoman Empire.

Later, slave trafficking was prohibited in practice by enforcing specific conditions of slavery in sharia, Islamic law, even though sharia permitted slavery in principle. For example, under one provision, a person who was captured could not be kept a slave if they had already been Muslim prior to their capture. Moreover, they could not be captured legitimately without a formal declaration of war, and only the Sultan could make such a declaration. As late Ottoman Sultans wished to halt slavery, they did not authorize raids for the purpose of capturing slaves, and thereby made it effectively illegal to procure new slaves, although those already in slavery remained slaves. In November 1874, the British Embassy discussed the increase of slave trafficking in northern Africa with the Ottoman government, with the aims of implementing measures to limit the trade of slaves. Even then, however, the British failed to secure the right to prevent the transportation of enslaved people across the Mediterranean (for example, from North Africa to İstanbul.)

The Anglo-Ottoman Convention of 1880 banned the Red Sea slave trade, and the British were given the right to stop and control all ships suspected of trafficking slaves on Ottoman waters; however, in practice, this prohibition was not enforced in the Hejaz Province.

The Tanzimat anti-slavery reforms were directed toward the public slave trade rather than the institution of slavery as such: by the late 19th and early 20th century, the sale of slaves had often moved from public slave markets to the private homes of the slave traders; the purchase of slaves, who were often bought as children, had come to be officially called adoptions, and the slaves in private households were officially called "servants", with no distinction being made between chattel slaves and domestic servants.

=== Suppression and aftermath ===
In an Imperial firman (decree) of 1887, chattel slavery was declared formally abolished and no longer legally recognized, the decree stating: "The Imperial government not officially recognizing the state of slavery, considers by law every person living in the empire to be free". This law was however nominal and slave trade continued. After British pressure, Sultan Abdul Hamid II promulgated a law against the African slave trade on 30 December 1889, Kanunname of 1889. However, this law did not include any special punishment against slave trade within the empire, and it was not deemed efficient.

The Ottoman Empire and 16 other countries signed the 1890 Brussels Conference Act for the suppression of the slave trade. The Act obliged the Ottoman Empire to manumit all slaves within its borders who had been illegally trafficked, and granted every signure states the right to liberate or demand the liberation of every one of their citizens who had been brought to the Ottoman Empire as slaves since 1889, and this Act was enforced in 1892.

Clandestine slavery persisted into the early 20th century. A circular by the Ministry of Internal Affairs in October 1895 warned local authorities that some steamships stripped Zanj sailors of their "certificates of liberation" and threw them into slavery. Another circular of the same year reveals that some newly freed Zanj slaves were arrested based on unfounded accusations, imprisoned and forced back to their lords. An instruction of the Ministry of Internal Affairs to the Vali of Bassora of 1897 ordered that the children of liberated slaves be issued separate certificates of liberation to avoid both being enslaved themselves and separated from their parents.

George Young, Second Secretary of the British Embassy in Constantinople, wrote in his Corpus of Ottoman Law, published in 1905, that at the time of this writing, his impression that the slave trade in the Empire was practiced only as contraband.

The house slaves, who were often women and children, were referred to as adoptees and domestic servants by the early 20th century, but were in fact still slaves, and given little money or no salary at all. In 1908, a state servant institution was established, the Hizmetçi İdaresi, to assist former female slaves who were often forced to prostitute themselves, but it came to function as a de facto slave market bazaar for women and children. In 1908, female slaves were still being openly sold on the slave market in the Ottoman Empire.

The Young Turks adopted an anti-slavery stance in the early 20th century. The Ottoman intellectuals showed little interest in the abolition of slavery as such, but focused on the closure of one of the most symbolic institutions of slavery: the slaves of the Imperial harem, who were officially released on 31 March 1909. While Sultan Abdul Hamid II's personal slaves were freed in 1909, the members of his dynasty were allowed to keep their slaves. Upper-class people in general kept their slaves also after the release of the Sultan's harem slaves.

Despite the Ottoman reforms introduced to limit and reduce slavery and slave trade in the Empire from 1830 onward, chattel slavery continued to exist in the former Ottoman provinces in the Middle East after the dissolution of the Ottoman Empire in 1917–1920: while slavery in Egypt was phased out after the ban of the slave trade in 1877–1884, existing slaves were noted as late as 1931; slavery in Iraq was banned after British pressure in 1924; slavery in Jordan was ended by the British in 1929; slavery in Lebanon as well as slavery in Syria was banned by the French in 1931; slavery in Palestine still existed under the guise of clientage in 1934; slavery in Libya still existed in 1930s; and slavery in Saudi Arabia lasted until it was abolished after pressure from the US in 1962, with slavery in Yemen being banned between 1962 and 1967.

=== During the Armenian genocide ===
During the Armenian genocide, Henry Morgenthau Sr., who served as the U.S. Ambassador in Constantinople from 1913 until 1916, reported in his Ambassador Morgenthau's Story that there were gangs that traded white slaves during those years. Morgenthau's writings also confirmed reports that Armenian girls were being sold as slaves. Armenian women and children were being displayed naked in Damascus in Ottoman Syria and sold at the slave market. At the end of the Ottoman Empire, chattel slavery was still tolerated by the Ottoman authorities in most provinces.

=== Labour battalions ===
During the course of World War I and the Turkish War of Independence, Turkish authorities enslaved over 500,000 Armenians and Greeks—primarily men, but also women and children—into labour battalions, as part of the Armenian genocide and the Greek genocide.

Enslaved people forced into labour battalions often died quickly and under crippling conditions in quarries, mines, and roads, or were killed by their Turkish guards. In 1921, Turkish authorities made false birth certificates declaring Greek orphans to be older than they actually were. In this way, children were also conscripted into labour battalions. In 1922, Herbert Adams Gibbons relayed a report by the Near East Relief to the U.S. Secretary of State Charles Evans Hughes, which warned that the Greeks were in a condition "worse than slavery", while even Mark Lambert Bristol reported that the Greek men in labour battalions were "treated like animals."

The brutal conditions in these battalions resulted in a very high death rate among victims, reaching from 80% to as high as 99%.

=== Republic of Turkey ===
Mustafa Kemal Atatürk ended legal slavery in the Turkish Republic. Nonetheless, illegal sales of girls were reportedly continued at least into the early 1930s. Turkey waited until 1933 to ratify the 1926 League of Nations convention on the suppression of slavery. Legislation explicitly prohibiting slavery was finally adopted in 1964.

== See also ==
- That Most Precious Merchandise: The Mediterranean Trade in Black Sea Slaves, 1260-1500
- The Twenty Classes
- History of slavery
- History of slavery in the Muslim world
- Islamic views on slavery
- Slavery and religion
- Slavery in the Regency of Algiers
- Slavery in Ottoman Tripolitania
- Slavery in Ottoman Egypt
- Slavery in Ottoman Palestine
- Slavery in Ottoman Syria
- Slavery in Ottoman Iraq
