= Kizlar agha =

Head of the eunuchs who guarded the imperial harem of the Ottoman sultans

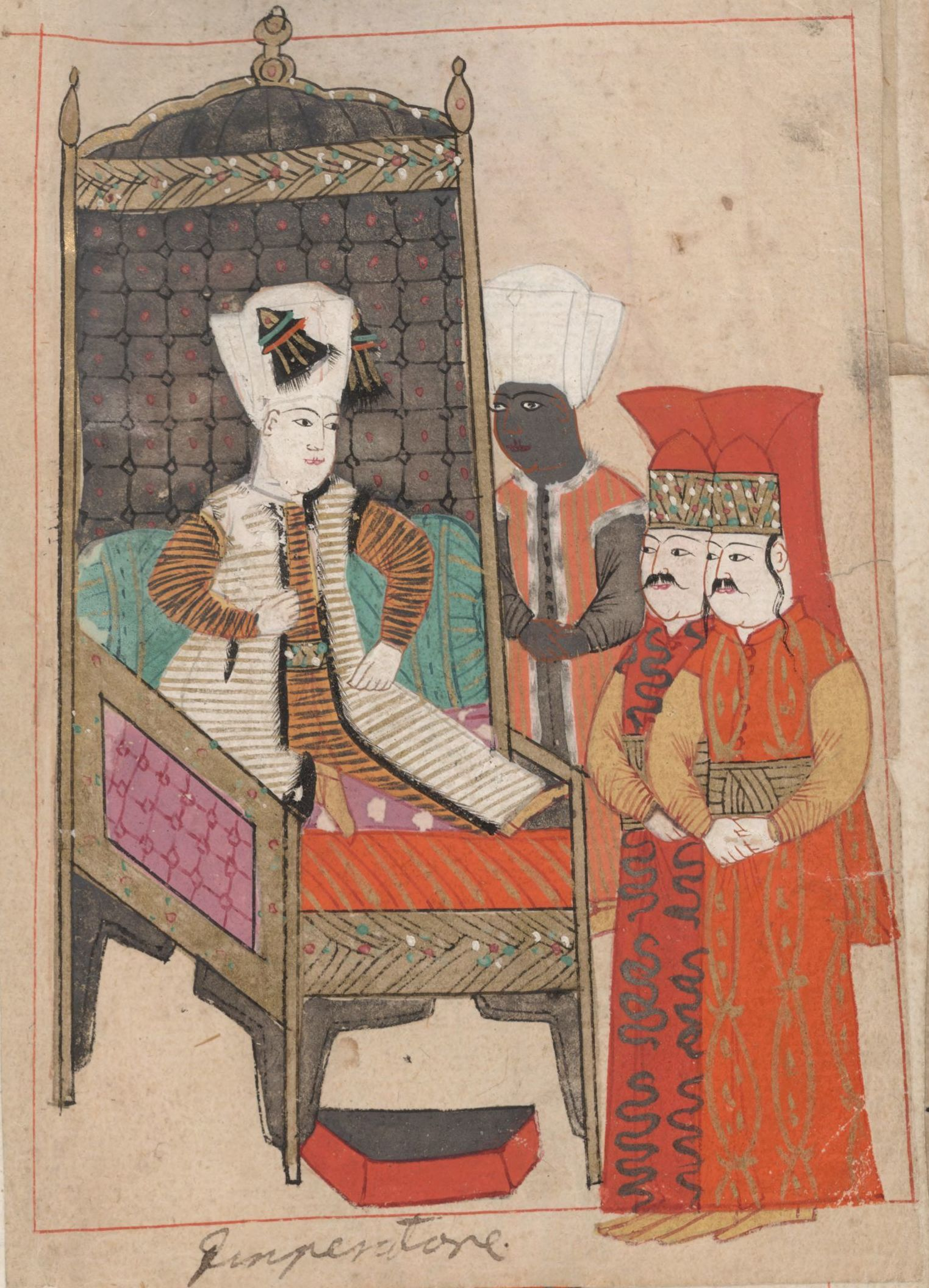
Image of a 17th-century kizlar agha's, from the Rålamb Book of Costumes

The Kizlar Agha (Ottoman Turkish: قيزلر اغاسی, Turkish: kızlar ağası, lit. '"agha of the girls"'), formally the Agha of the House of Felicity (Ottoman Turkish: دار السعاده اغاسي, Turkish: Darüssaade Ağası), was the head of the eunuchs who guarded the Ottoman Imperial Harem in Constantinople.

Established in 1574, the post ranked among the most important in the Ottoman Empire until the early 19th century, especially after the stewardship of the two holy cities of Mecca and Medina and the supervision of all waqfs (charitable foundations) in the Empire came under his purview. The wealth thus amassed, the proximity to the sultan, and the role the harem ladies played in court intrigues ("Sultanate of Women") meant that its occupant had considerable political influence; several kızlar aghas were responsible for the downfall of grand viziers and the accession of sultans. Soon after its creation and until its abolition, close to the abolition of the Ottoman sultanate, the post came to be occupied by Black African eunuch slaves, and hence is also referred to as the Chief Black Eunuch.

== History ==
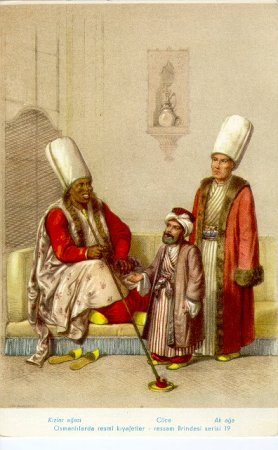
19th-century depiction of the Chief Black Eunuch (left), a court dwarf (middle) and the Chief White Eunuch (right)

The post of the Kizlar Agha was created in the reign of Murad III (r. 1574–1595) in 1574, with the Habeshi Mehmed Agha as its first occupant. Until then, the Ottoman palace had been dominated by the white eunuchs, chiefly drawn from the Christian populations of the Balkans or the Caucasus.

The 16th century, however, saw a rapid rise of the population of the Topkapı Palace, including among eunuchs, whose numbers rose from 40 under Selim I (r. 1512–1520) to over a thousand under Murad III. While black eunuchs had served alongside white eunuchs in the palace, by 1592, for unclear reasons, both a separation of roles as well as the ascendancy of the black eunuchs over the white ones had become established: white eunuchs were restricted to the supervision of the male pages (iç oğlan ("Enderûn (Inner [Palace] Boy)"), while black eunuchs took over the far more prestigious supervision of the private apartments of the sultan and the palace women. Consequently, the "chief black eunuch" quickly eclipsed the "chief white eunuch" or kapı ağası "agha of the gate", who had hitherto been the head of the palace personnel, and rose to become, in the words of the Orientalist scholar Clifford Edmund Bosworth, "in practice the principal officer of the whole palace".

At the height of the post's power in the 17th and 18th centuries, the Kizlar Agha was a vizier of the first rank ("with three tuğs") and came third in the state hierarchy, next only to the Empire's chief minister, the grand vizier, and the chief religious authority, the Shaykh al-Islām.

== Court responsibilities ==
The post’s power derived not only from its close physical proximity to the sultan but also from its intimate association with the sultan’s mother—the powerful valide sultan—who often wielded significant political influence within the court, particularly during the so-called Sultanate of Women period. The Kizlar Agha, as chief of the black eunuchs, served as the de facto gatekeeper between the secluded world of the imperial harem and the Selamlık, the outer, male quarters of the palace. In this role, he oversaw the provisioning and administration of the harem and controlled all correspondence and communication entering or leaving it.

Because of the trust placed in him by both the sultan and the valide sultan, the Kizlar Agha also became an essential political intermediary. He was the only individual permitted to carry written or verbal communications between the grand vizier and the sultan, giving him unique access to matters of state and positioning him as a discreet but influential figure in the empire’s bureaucratic hierarchy. His participation in public ceremonies further underscored this status, as he frequently represented the harem’s interests in formal court functions, religious festivals, and state receptions.

Within the palace, his responsibilities extended beyond political mediation. The Kizlar Agha supervised the education and moral upbringing of the imperial princes until they reached puberty, at which point they were transferred to the palace school to continue their training in governance and court etiquette. Through these combined roles—as guardian of the harem, political emissary, and tutor to the dynasty—the Kizlar Agha became one of the most powerful and enduring figures of the Ottoman court.

== Relation to the harem ==
Within the imperial harem, the reason East Africans were predominantly recruited as eunuchs, rather than those of Caucasian origin, remains unclear. It has been suggested that because white eunuchs already served in the male harem prior to the establishment of the female harem—and given the significant influx of Habeşi slaves at the time of the latter’s creation in Topkapı Palace—black eunuchs were naturally assigned to this newly formed institution. These elite black slaves were selected for the sultan by the Egyptian pasha and Mamluk beys.

Another reason for the employment of black eunuchs was the perceived cultural and geographical differences between the Kizlar Agha and the harem he guarded. The rationale was that such differences would help prevent sexual contact between the guardians and the women of the harem. Ottoman historian Jane Hathaway also suggests that these displaced elite slaves were preferred over free subjects due to concerns about the latter’s loyalty; the East African slaves’ dependence on their new rulers and lack of familial ties were seen as ensuring freedom from regional bias.

Most Kizlar Agha did not remain in service to the imperial harem until their deaths. They were typically dismissed and exiled to Cairo, thereby removed from the center of political power. Although no longer active within the harem of the Ottoman capital, an exiled Kizlar Agha often retained considerable influence through a network of former holders of the office, with whom the new incumbent generally maintained contact.

== Political influence ==
In Ottoman legal theory, the sultan was supposed to conduct affairs of state exclusively via the grand vizier, but in reality this arrangement was often circumvented. As the Ottomanist Colin Imber writes, the sultan "had closer contact with the pages of the privy chamber, the agha of the gate, the agha of the girls or with other courtiers than he did with the grand vizier, and these too could petition the sultan on their own or somebody else’s behalf. He might, too, be more inclined to take the advice of his mother, a concubine or the head gardener at the helm of the royal barge than of the grand vizier". Thus the Kizlar Agha's political power, exercised behind the scenes, was very considerable, influencing imperial policy and at times controlling the appointments to the grand vizierate, or even intervening in dynastic disputes and the succession to the throne. The Kizlar Agha Hacı Mustafa Agha secured the succession of Mustafa I (r. 1617–1618, 1622–1623) on the throne in 1617, and backed Osman II's (r. 1618–1622) attempts at military reform; while in 1651 the Kizlar Agha Lala Süleyman Agha murdered the powerful Valide Sultan Kösem on behalf of her rival and daughter-in-law, Turhan.

The often pernicious involvement of the chief black eunuchs in politics led to at least one attempt, by Grand Vizier Silahdar Damat Ali Pasha in 1715, to curb their influence by prohibiting the recruitment and castration of black slaves, but this was never carried out due to his death soon after. Indeed, the long tenure of Hacı Beshir Agha that followed in 1717–1746 is recognized as perhaps the apogee of the post's power and influence. Beshir Agha was a notable patron of the "Tulip Era" culture then flourishing in the empire, being was engaged in "intellectual and religious pursuits" that according to historian Jateen Lad "contributed to the Ottoman brand of Hanafi Islam and Sunni orthodoxy in general". After the downfall of Sultan Ahmed III in 1730, his influence was such that he was responsible for the elevation of grand viziers and the direction of foreign affairs. In 1731, Grand Vizier Kabakulak Ibrahim Pasha tried to force Beshir's retirement to stop him from interfering in state affairs, but through the influence of the valide sultan, Beshir secured Ibrahim's dismissal instead. Beshir died in 1747 at an advanced age. His successor, also called Beshir, was executed in 1752.

After that, the grand viziers curtailed the kizlar aghas' power. The 1830s reforms of Sultan Mahmud II (r. 1808–1839) finally ended the political power of the kizlar aghas, and those who held the role were confined to their palace and ceremonial role, which continued until the abolition of the office following the Young Turk Revolution in 1908.

=== Administration of the vakifs ===
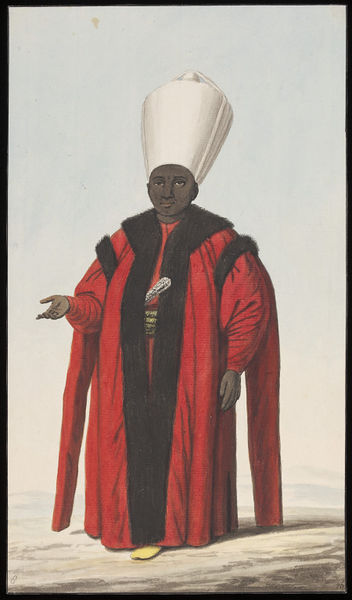
Depiction of a Kizlar Agha, c. 1809

The kizlar agha also held a special role as the nazir "administrator" of the waqfs designated for the upkeep of the two holy cities (al-Haramayn) of Islam, Mecca and Medina, being responsible for their supply as well as for the annual ritual sending of gifts (sürre) to them. Vakifs designated for the upkeep of the Muslim holy places had been established by members of the Ottoman court since early times, and their administration entrusted to special departments already since the late 15th century. Initially under the overall supervision of the Kapi Agha, in 1586 Murad III transferred the responsibility to the kizlar agha.

Control of the waqfs was, in the words of Bernard Lewis, a major "source of power and profit" for the kizlar agha, and the foundation of the office's political influence: its conferment by Murad III marked the start of the office's ascendancy, and its eventual removal by Mahmud II marked its end. As part of the grand viziers' attempts to lessen the power of the kizlar aghas, unsuccessful attempts were made in the reigns of Mustafa III (r. 1757–1774) and Abdul Hamid I (r. 1774–1789) to remove the waqfs from his jurisdiction. Finally, in 1834, Mahmud II deprived the post of the supervision of the waqfs and granted it to a new Ministry of Waqfs.

This began a long process whereby the kizlar agha gradually acquired a sweeping jurisdiction over the various waqfs of the Empire: already in May 1598, he acquired control of the foundations allocated to the upkeep of the imperial mosques in the capital, followed soon after by vakifs in both Constantinople and other parts of the Empire, often entrusted to his care by the ladies of the palace. Among the possessions that fell to the kizlar agha in this way was the city of Athens. According to a—possibly semi-fictional—17th-century account, the administration of the city was originally granted to Basilica, one of Sultan Ahmed I's (r. 1603–1617) favourite concubines, who hailed from the city and who, having received many complaints of its maladministration, obtained its possession as a gift from the sultan. After her death, Athens came under the purview of the kizlar agha.

The administration of the waqfs was exercised through two subordinates, the chief secretary (yazici) and the inspector of waqfs (müfettiş), and was divided into two fiscal departments: the Bureau of Accounts of the Holy Cities (muhasebe-i haremeyn kalemi), which by the late 18th century supervised the imperial mosques and the waqfs of Istanbul and European provinces, and the Bureau of the Leases of the Holy Cities (mukataa-i haremeyn kalemi), which supervised the vakifs of the Asian and African provinces. A special treasury, the haremeyn dolabi, contained the revenue from the vakifs, and the kizlar agha held a weekly divan or council to examine the accounts.

== Recruitment and advancement ==
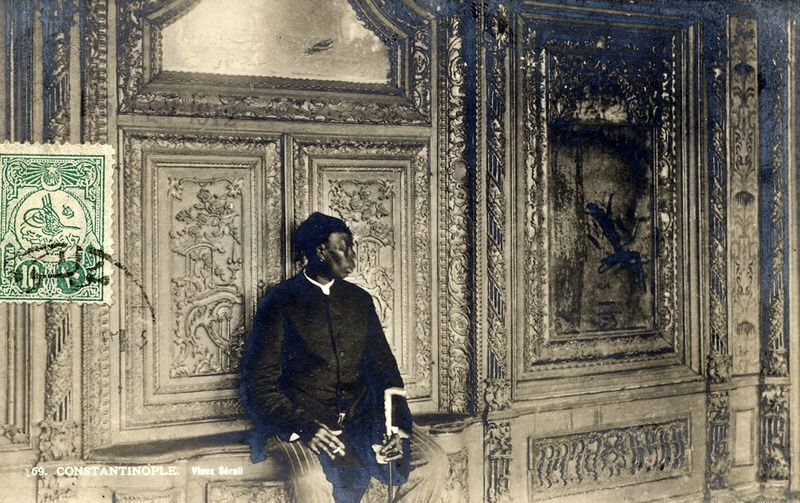
Postcard with the chief black eunuch of Sultan Abdul Hamid II, early 20th century

Most of the office's holders, like most black eunuchs in general, were identified ethnically as Habeşi, meaning Nilotic peoples inhabiting Ethiopia's southern hinterland and Omotic speakers. Black slaves, usually purchased as boys from Nubian slavers, then castrated and inducted into the palace service, had begun to be employed as the guards of the women of the sultan's harem since the time of Murad III's predecessor, Selim II (r. 1566–1574), and continued to be so employed until the Ottoman Empire's end.

Due to Islamic prohibitions on castration, slaves were preferably castrated Copts, Egyptian Jews, and Ethiopian Jews. Also, the people who were castrated due to their crimes were accepted in this job as well. The eunuchs usually received flower names, and after a period of training in the palace school, they entered service in the harem. The eunuchs began at the post of ordinary recruit (en aşağı, literally "the lowest", and acemi ağa, "the untrained"), and gradually advanced through the ranks, from nevbet kalfa ("watch substitute") to senior posts in the guard of the harem. Having completed their training and after a period of service, some were detached from guard duties and transferred to the attendance of the inhabitants of the harem: the sultan's attendants (müsahip ağaları), the seven eunuch servants plus a head eunuch (baş ağa) attached to each valide, principal wife (kadın), or prince (şehzade), the eunuch imams who led harem prayers, the harem's treasurer (hazinedar ağası), or the müsendereci, who supervised the work of the other eunuchs. The senior-most eunuchs were known as hasıllı, from an Arabic word meaning "product".

From these senior posts, a eunuch could be selected and appointed to the post of kizlar agha by imperial decree (hatt-ı hümayun) and the ceremonial receipt of a robe of office (hil'at) from the sultan. Alongside the lands belonging to the office, the kizlar agha usually received a personal fief (hass). In the Topkapi Palace, the kizlar agha had his own spacious apartment near the Aviary Gate, while the other eunuchs under his supervision lived together in cramped and rather squalid conditions in a three-storey barracks. When they were dismissed, the chief black eunuchs received a pension (asatlık, literally "document of liberty") and from 1644 on were exiled to Egypt or the Hejaz. Starting in the late 17th century, many former holders were appointed to head the eunuchs who guarded the Tomb of Muhammad in Medina. As a result, serving kizlar aghas often took care to prepare for a comfortable retirement in Egypt by buying property and establishing vakifs of their own there. In exile, many former kizlar aghas became local grandees, engaging in the patronage of trade, agriculture, and charitable endowments. Given Egypt’s vital role in provisioning the two holy cities of Mecca and Medina—a responsibility traditionally overseen by the Kizlar Agha while in office—the exiled aghas and their agents (vakils) came to occupy a significant position within the economy of Ottoman Egypt.

The careers of a significant number of kizlar aghas are known from the Hamiletü’l-kübera of the late 18th-century Ottoman statesman and historian Ahmed Resmî Efendi, listing the occupants of the office from Mehmed Agha (1574–90) until Moralı Beshir Agha (1746–52). The work is complemented by select biographies in the Sicill-i Osmani by the late 19th-century scholar Mehmed Süreyya Bey, while information on the history and evolution of the office in the institutional framework of the Ottoman palace is contained in Tayyarzade Ahmed Ata's Tarih-i Ata (1876).

== Sources ==
- Al-Abdin, Bashir (2009). "The Political and Administrative Role of the Kizlar a ghas in Egypt During the first Half of the twelfth Century A.H (A.D 1687-1737), in Contemporary Arabic Manuscript Sources". An-Najah University Journal for Research - B (Humanities). 23 (4): 1223–1240. doi:10.35552/0247-023-004-010. hdl:20.500.11888/2625. S2CID 154713768.
- Augustinos, Olga (2007). "Eastern Concubines, Western Mistresses: Prévost's Histoire d'une Grecque moderne". In Buturović, Amila; Schick, İrvin Cemil (eds.). Women in the Ottoman Balkans: Gender, Culture and History. London and New York: I.B. Tauris. pp. 11–44. ISBN 978-1-84511-505-0.
- Bosworth, Clifford Edmund (1986). "Ḳi̊z". In Bosworth, C. E.; van Donzel, E.; Lewis, B. & Pellat, Ch. (eds.). The Encyclopaedia of Islam, Second Edition. Volume V: Khe–Mahi. Leiden: E. J. Brill. pp. 242–243. ISBN 978-90-04-07819-2.
- Davis, Fanny (1986). The Ottoman Lady: A Social History from 1718 to 1918. Greenwood Press. ISBN 0-313-24811-7.
- Freely, John (2000). Inside the Seraglio: Private Lives of the Sultans in Istanbul. Penguin Books. ISBN 0-14-027056-6.
- Hathaway, Jane (1992). "The Role of the Kizlar Aǧasi in 17th-18th Century Ottoman Egypt". Studia Islamica (75): 141–158. doi:10.2307/1595624. JSTOR 1595624.
- Hathaway, Jane (1998). "Egypt in the seventeenth century". In Daly, M. W. (ed.). The Cambridge History of Egypt, Volume 2: From 1517 to the End of the Twentieth Century. Cambridge University Press. pp. 34–58. doi:10.1017/CHOL9780521472111.003. ISBN 978-0-521-47211-1.
- Hathaway, Jane (2005). Beshir Agha: Chief Eunuch of the Ottoman Imperial Harem. Oxford: Oneworld. ISBN 1-85168-390-9.
- Hathaway, Jane (2018). "Chapter 12". The Chief Eunuch of the Ottoman Harem From African Slave to Power-Broker. Cambridge University Press. pp. 276–279. doi:10.1017/9781316257876. ISBN 9781107108295. S2CID 165833400.
- Hathaway, Jane (2019). "Kızlar Ağası". In Fleet, Kate; Krämer, Gudrun; Matringe, Denis; Nawas, John; Rowson, Everett (eds.). Encyclopaedia of Islam (3rd ed.). Brill Online. ISSN 1873-9830.
- Imber, Colin (2002). The Ottoman Empire, 1300–1650: The Structure of Power (First ed.). Basingstoke: Palgrave Macmillan. ISBN 978-0-3336-1386-3.
- Junne, George H. (2016). The Black Eunuchs of the Ottoman Empire: Networks of Power in the Court of the Sultan. Bloomsbury Publishing. ISBN 978-0-8577-2808-1.
- Lad, Jateen (2010). "Panoptic Bodies: Black Eunuchs as Guardians of the Topkapi Harem". In Booth, Marilyn (ed.). Harem Histories: Envisioning Places and Living Spaces. Duke University Press. pp. 136–176. doi:10.1215/9780822393467-009. ISBN 978-0-8223-4869-6. JSTOR j.ctv11g9658.
- Lewis, Bernard (1971). "al-Ḥaramayn". In Lewis, B.; Ménage, V. L.; Pellat, Ch. & Schacht, J. (eds.). The Encyclopaedia of Islam, Second Edition. Volume III: H–Iram. Leiden: E. J. Brill. pp. 175–176. OCLC 495469525.
- Rowoldt Shell, Sandra (2018). Children of Hope: The Odyssey of the Oromo Slaves from Ethiopia to South Africa. Ohio University Press. ISBN 978-0-8214-2318-9.
- Scholz, Piotr O. (2001). Eunuchs and Castrati: A Cultural History. Markus Wiener Publishers. ISBN 978-1-55876-200-8.
