= Beshir Agha =

Ottoman courtier and politician

Kizlar agha
- In office c.1716–1746
- Monarchs: Ahmed III; Mahmud I

Personal details
- Born: 1650’s Abyssinia
- Died: 1746 (aged 90’s) Topkapi Palace, Constantinople, Ottoman Empire

Beshir Agha was an Ottoman eunuch.

== Career ==
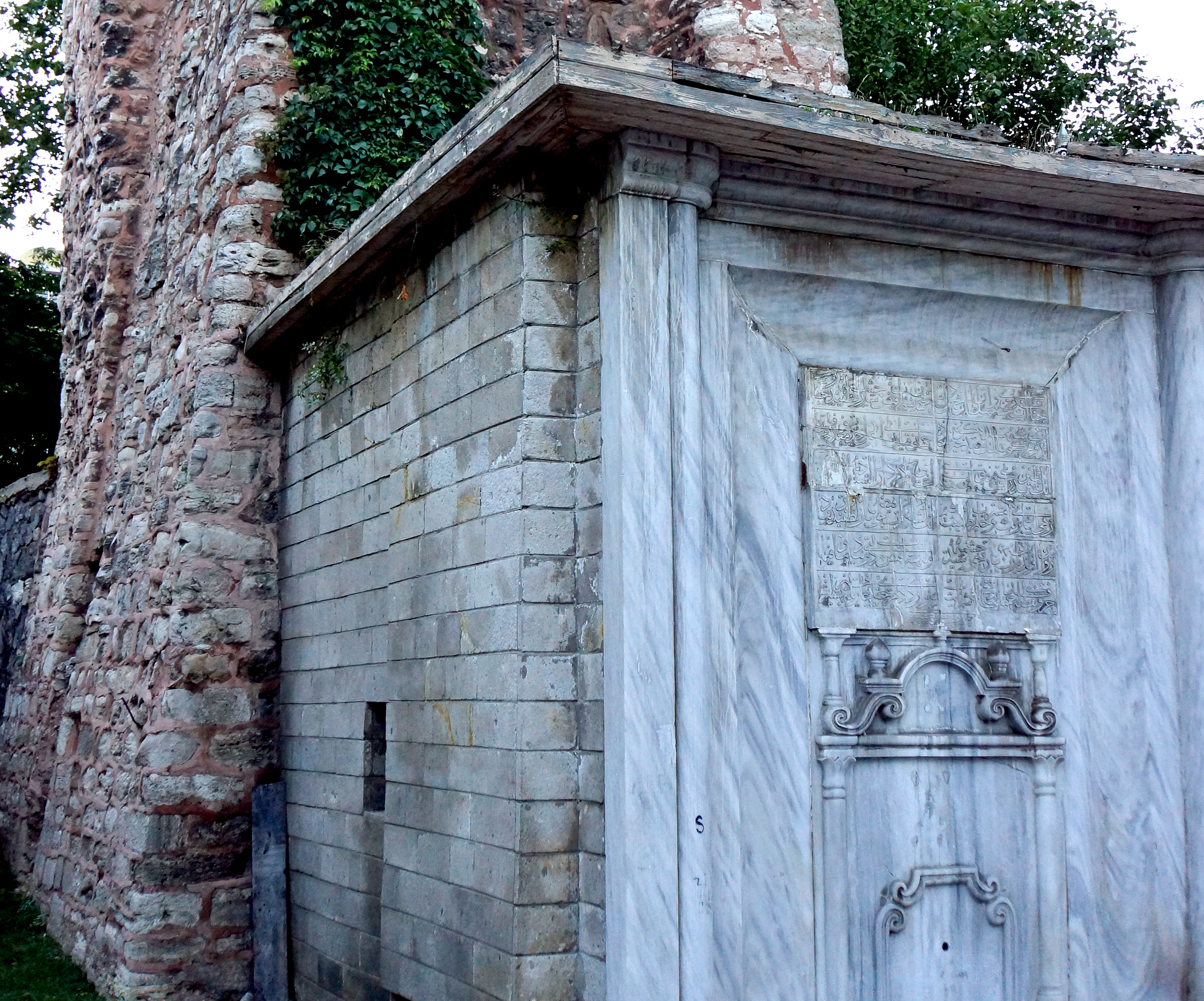
Fountain in Istanbul patronage by Beshir Agha

Agha was born in Ethiopia and was brought to Ottoman Empire as a slave. He held various positions before his 1713 exile to Cyprus for unknown reasons. Despite this, he soon protected the Prophet's Mosque in Medina as one of the numerous eunuchs. Around age 60, he returned to Istanbul and was appointed Chief Harem Eunuch under Sultan Ahmed III in 1716.

Engaging in literary pursuits and politics, Agha deposed the previous grand vizier, promoting Nevşehirli Damat Ibrahim Pasha in his place.

Although Ahmed III was overthrown in 1730, Agha continued as chief eunuch under Sultan Mahmud I, accruing significant authority. As protector of the Holy Places, he influenced the Ottoman interpretation of Sunni Islam, particularly the Hanafi legal rite. At times, his position was second only to the sultan and grand vizier.

By his 1746 death, Agha, in his 90s, had become one of the wealthiest, most powerful, and longest-lived chief harem eunuchs in Ottoman history.
