= Slavery in Turkey =

Slavery in Turkey is illegal, though like many other countries, it suffers from issues relating to human trafficking. Historically, slavery in Turkey was significant during the Ottoman Empire period. It is estimated there are 1.32 million modern slaves in Turkey today. According to Walk Free, Turkey ranks 5th in the world and first in Europe and Central Asia in number of modern slaves.

== Background and history ==
Slavery was a significant part of the Ottoman Empire's economy. Slaves were supplied from Europe via the Barbary slave trade, the Crimean slave trade and the Circassian slave trade; and from Africa via the Trans-Saharan slave trade, the Red Sea slave trade and the Indian Ocean slave trade. From 1830 onward, the Ottoman Empire issued a number of reforms gradually restricting slavery and slave trade. Among the reforms representing the process of official abolition of slavery in the Ottoman Empire where the Firman of 1830, the Disestablishment of the Istanbul Slave Market (1847), the Suppression of the slave trade in the Persian Gulf (1847), the Prohibition of the Circassian and Georgian slave trade (1854–1855), the Prohibition of the Black Slave Trade (1857), and the Anglo-Ottoman Convention of 1880, followed by the Kanunname of 1889 and the excluding of slavery from the Constitution of 1908.

However, these reforms were mainly nominal. They were introduced for diplomatic reasons after pressure from the West, and in practice, both slavery and the slave trade were tolerated by the Ottoman Empire until its dissolution in the early 1920's.

== Modern ==
Turkey is one of the top destinations for victims of human trafficking, according to a report produced by the UNDOC. In 2023 it is estimated there are 1.32 million modern slaves in Turkey today. Turkey is the leading slave state in Europe and Central Asia. It is thought some of the 3000 Yazidi women and children enslaved by ISIS are held today in Turkey. A Walk Free report indicated that the Turkish government is one of the countries taking the least action against slavery. Turkey ranks 5th in the world in terms of modern slavery according to Bianet.

In 2006 it was reported by Salon that Ukrainian women were sold into sex slavery in Turkey. The Salon also reported that Turkish authorities were relatively indifferent to the women's plight.

A 2016 report based on the Global Slavery Index estimated that there may be about "480,000 people in Turkey [who] live like modern slaves".

Many members of the Afro-Turk minority are descendants of the former slaves.

== See also ==
- History of slavery in the Muslim world
- Human rights in Turkey
