= Maid =

Female domestic worker

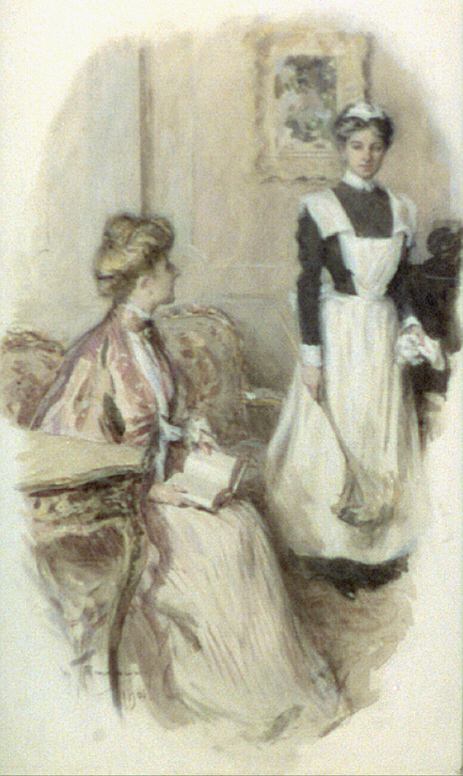
Illustration by William Thomas Smedley, 1906

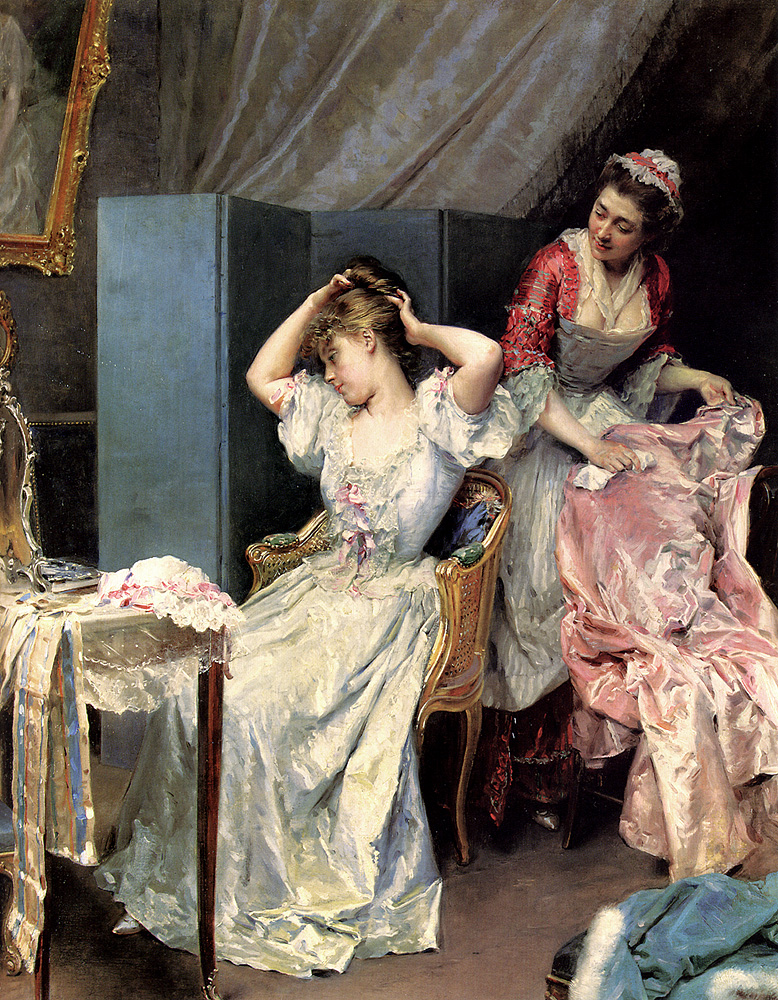
La Toilette by Raimundo de Madrazo y Garreta, c. 1890 – c. 1900

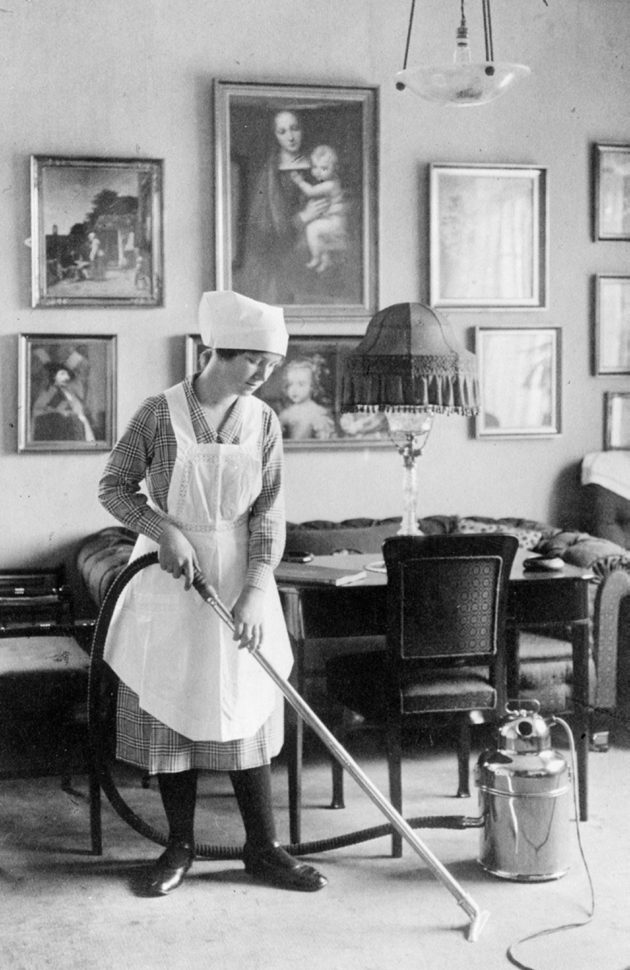
A maid cleaning in Denmark in 1912.

A maid, housemaid, or maidservant is a female domestic worker. In the Victorian era, domestic service was the second-largest category of employment in England and Wales, after agricultural work. In developed Western nations, full-time maids are now typically only found in the wealthiest households. In other parts of the world (mainly in Asia), maids remain common in urban middle-class households.

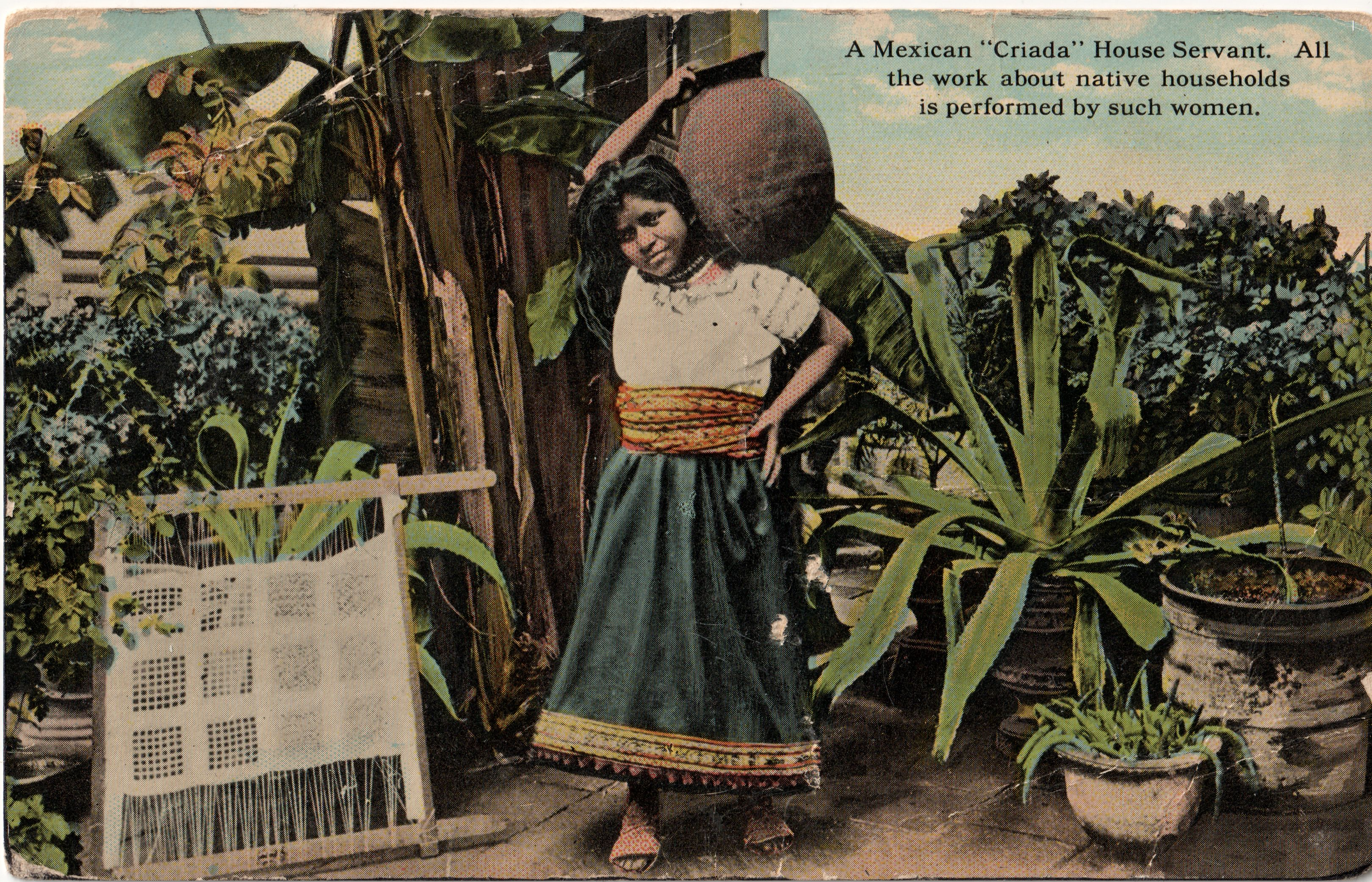
Mexican maid in the early 20th century

Maid in Middle English meant an unmarried woman, especially a young one, or specifically a virgin. These meanings remained persistent in the English language until recent times (and remain familiar in literature and folk music), alongside word's sense as a type of servant.

== Description ==
Maids perform typical domestic chores such as laundry, ironing, cleaning the house, grocery shopping, cooking, and caring for household pets. They may also take care of children, although there are more specific occupations for this, such as nanny. In some poor countries, maids take care of the elderly and people with disabilities. Many maids are required by their employers to wear a uniform.

In the contemporary Western world, comparatively few households can afford live-in domestic help, usually relying on cleaners, employed directly or through an agency (maid service). Many services historically provided by maids have been substituted with home appliances.

In less developed nations, various factors ensure a labour source for domestic work: very large differences in the income of urban and rural households, widespread poverty, fewer educated women, and limited opportunities for the employment of less educated women.

Legislation in many countries makes certain living conditions, working hours, or minimum wage a requirement of domestic service. Nonetheless, the work of a maid has always been hard, involving a full day and extensive duties. Maids would be familiar with hard work and typically worked long hours in a week.

== By location ==
=== Europe ===
==== British Isles ====
Maids were once part of an elaborate hierarchy in great houses, where the retinue of servants stretched up to the housekeeper and butler, responsible for female and male employees respectively. It was the most common way that women could earn money, especially lower-class women. Domestic workers, particularly those low in the hierarchy, such as maids and footmen, were expected to remain unmarried while in service. They sometimes had their own section of rooms in the house, though they were often far away from the other rooms and more simply furnished than the rest of the house.

In Victorian England, all middle-class families would have employed staff, but for most small households, this would be only one employee, the maid of all work. Some households employed maids-of-all-work as young as twelve in 19th-century England. They often worked from five in the morning until late in the evening on a wage of £6 to £9 per year. They typically only had one or two days off in a month.

Historically, many maids suffered from prepatellar bursitis, an inflammation of the prepatellar bursa caused by long periods spent on the knees for purposes of scrubbing and fire-lighting, leading to the condition attracting the colloquial name of "housemaid's knee".

As the end of the 19th century neared, the relationship between employer and servant changed. By the end of the nineteenth century, there was a decline in the demand for domestic staff entirely.

==== Types ====
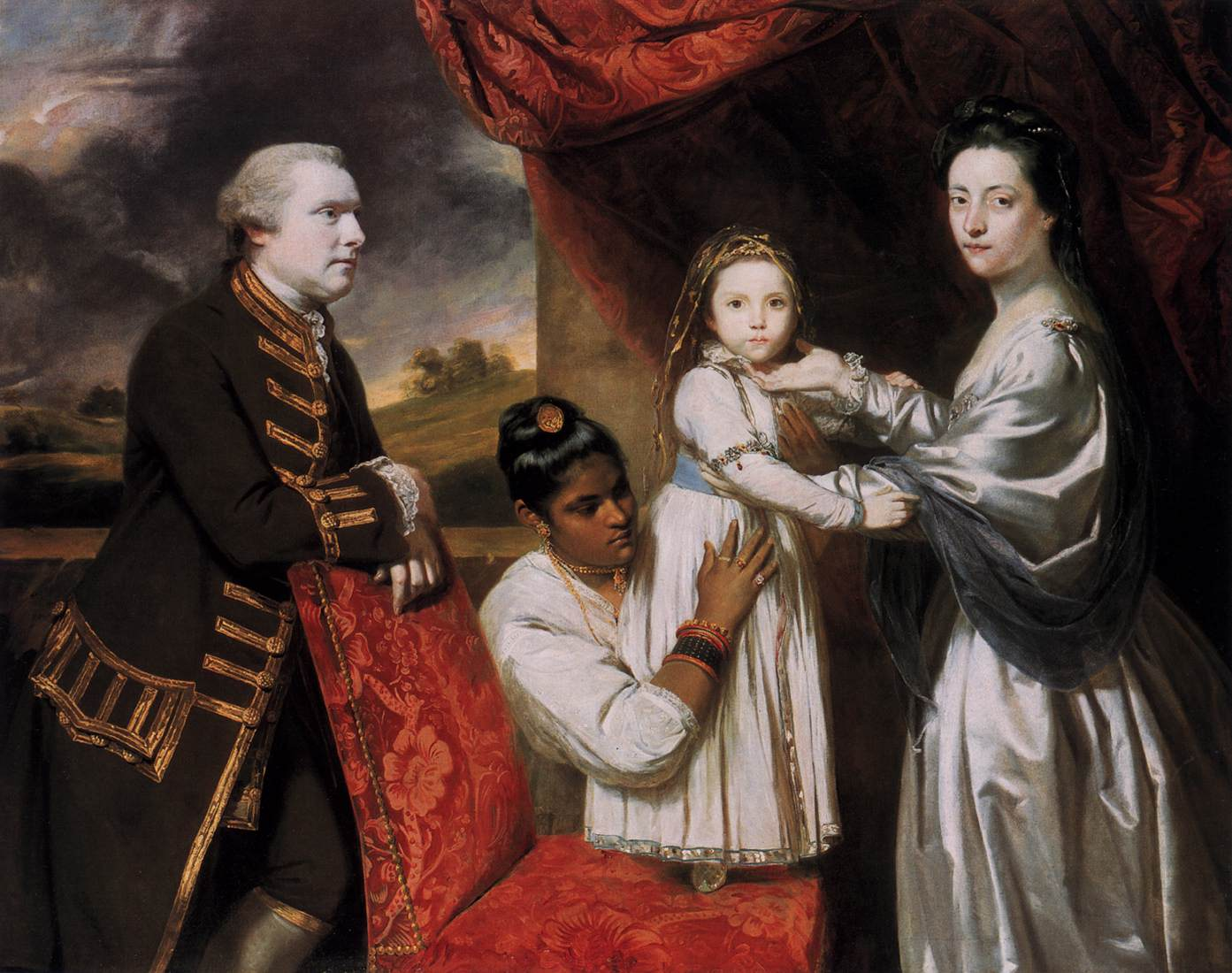
Tysoe Hancock and his family with an Indian maid, Clarinda, painted 1765 by Joshua Reynolds. As she appears to be caring for the child, she may be an aya.

Maids traditionally have a fixed position in the hierarchy of the large households, and although there is overlap between definitions (dependent on the size of the household), the positions themselves would typically be rigidly adhered to. The usual classifications of maid in a large household are:

- Lady's maid: a senior servant who reported directly to the lady of the house, but ranked beneath the housekeeper, and accompanied her lady on travel. She took care of her mistress's clothes and hair, and sometimes served as confidante.
- House-maid: a generic term for maids whose function was chiefly "above stairs", and were usually a little older, and better paid. Where a household included multiple housemaids, the roles were often subdivided as below.
  - Head house-maid: the senior house maid, reporting to the housekeeper. (Also called "house parlour maid" in an establishment with only one or two upstairs maids).
  - Parlour maid: cleaned and tidied reception rooms and living areas by morning, and often served refreshments at afternoon tea, and sometimes also dinner. They tidied studies and libraries, and (with footmen) answered bells calling for service.
  - Chamber maid: cleaned and maintained the bedrooms, ensured fires were lit in fireplaces, and supplied hot water.
  - Laundry maid: maintained bedding and towels. They also washed, dried, and ironed clothes for the whole household, including the servants.
  - Under house parlour maid: performed a parlour maid's duties below stairs.
- Nursery maid: also an "upstairs maid", but one who worked in the children's nursery, maintaining fires, cleanliness, and good order. Reported to the nanny rather than the housekeeper. The nursemaid would often stay with one family for years or as long as their services were needed.
- Kitchen maid: a "below stairs" maid who reported to the cook, and assisted in running the kitchens.
  - Head kitchen maid: where multiple kitchen maids were employed, the "head kitchen maid" was effectively a deputy to the cook, engaged largely in the plainer and simpler cooking (sometimes cooking the servants' meals).
  - Under kitchen maid: where multiple kitchen maids were employed, these were the staff who prepared vegetables, peeled potatoes, and assisted in presentation of finished cooking for serving.
- Scullery maid: the lowest grade of "below stairs" maid, reporting to the cook, the scullery maids were responsible for washing cutlery, crockery, and glassware, and scrubbing kitchen floors, as well as monitoring ovens while kitchen maids ate their own supper.
- Between maid, sometimes known as a "tweeny": roughly equivalent in status to scullery maids, and often paid less, between maids in a large household waited on the senior servants (butler, housekeeper, and cook) and were therefore answerable to all three department heads, often leading to friction in their employment.
- Still room maid: a junior maid employed in the still room; as the work involved the supply of alcohol, cosmetics, medicines, and cooking ingredients across all departments of the house, the still room maids were part of the "between staff", jointly answerable to all three department heads.

In more modest households, a single maid-of-all-work or skivvy was often the only staff. It is possible this word originates from the Italian for slave ("schiavo"—"owned person").

=== Asia ===
An ayi (aunt in Mandarin) works as a domestic helper in China, and occasionally provides personalized childcare.

=== Middle East ===
In the history of slavery in the Muslim world, domestic servitude was one of the driving forces behind the slave trade. The ideal of Islamic sex segregation made it difficult for free Muslim women to work as servants, at the same time, the sex segregation made it difficult for male servants to access the harem women's quarter of the house, resulting in difficulty in Muslim women to have access to domestic servants. This dilemma resulted in the Muslim world using house slaves for domestic servants rather than free servants. By Islamic law, slaves owned by Muslims were to be foreign non-Muslims (kafirs) who were by definition legitimate targets for enslavement, since the Muslim world of dar al-islam was by definition at war with the non-Muslim world of dar al-harb ("House of War"). Female slaves were thus not subjected to the same Islamic customs. It also made it possible for male slaves to be made eunuchs. This solved both the dilemma of female servants being able to work in the household of a family as well as for a male servant to enter the women's quarter of a home. The slave trade to the Muslim world prioritized women and children, though men were also trafficked. In bigger households there were typically a mix of male and female house slaves.

In the Islamic world, female slaves were normally purchased for one of two reasons: for the purpose of sexual slavery as concubines or as domestic servants, and used for service in the harems. Women domestic slaves were purchased to perform chores for the sex segregated women in the harem. Women domestic slaves were used for all sorts of household chores normally performed by women, and could also be sent outside of the harem to perform tasks for the harem women in the city outside of the home. Black African women were most commonly used for domestic slave labor in Egypt, the Arab world and the Ottoman Empire. In the Islamic Middle East, African women – trafficked via the trans-Saharan slave trade, the Red Sea slave trade and the Indian Ocean slave trade – were primarily used as domestic house servants and not exclusively for sexual slavery, while white women, trafficked via the Black Sea slave trade and Circassian slave trade, were preferred for the use of concubines (sex slaves) or wives, and there was therefore a constant demand for them in the Middle East. The women of the family monitored the work of the domestic slaves, decided what to do with the leftovers of food, and made sure that the slaves performed the Islamic prayers.

Most of the Middle East were included in the Ottoman Empire. When the slavery in the Ottoman Empire were nominally abolished by the Kanunname of 1889, the former house slaves normally continued to work as nominally free maidservants; their employers could however now fire them instead of selling them on the slave market, creating a class of free servants. After the closure of the slave market Avret Pazari in Constantinople by the Disestablishment of the Istanbul Slave Market, the Young Turks founded the Hizmetçi İdaresi as a Servant Institution to assist former female slaves to find employment as domestic workers and maidservants in order to escape prostitution to survive, though the institution is reported to have functioned, in practice, as a slave market.

House slaves were used in the Muslim Middle East until the mid 20th-century. Despite the Ottoman anti slavery reforms introduced in the 19th-century, chattel slavery continued to exist in the former Ottoman provinces in the Middle East after the dissolution of the Ottoman Empire in 1917–1920: while slavery in Egypt was phased out after the ban of the slave trade in 1877–1884, existing slaves were noted as late as 1931; slavery in Iraq was banned after British pressure in 1924; slavery in Jordan was ended by the British in 1929; slavery in Lebanon as well as slavery in Syria was banned by the French in 1931; slavery in Palestine still existed under the guise of clientage in 1934; slavery in Libya still existed in 1930s; and slavery in Saudi Arabia lasted until it was abolished after pressure from the US in 1962, with slavery in Yemen being banned between 1962 and 1967.

After the abolition of slavery in the Middle East in the 20th-century, chattel slavery was succeeded by the kafala system. Today, foreign women are employed in Saudi Arabia, Kuwait, Qatar, Lebanon, Singapore, Hong Kong, Japan and United Arab Emirates in large numbers to work as maids or other roles of domestic service, and are often vulnerable to multiple forms of abuse.

=== Southern Africa ===
In some areas in the region, the word "maid" is avoided and is often referred to as a "helper" instead. This is most likely due to the fact that it sounds like a racially derogatory term in Afrikaans. The Afrikaans word for a mite (small arachnid) has been used demeaningly to refer to women of colour. The English word for a friend, "mate", is also avoided for this reason. Maids in South Africa were referred to as domestic servants and they included men, women, and children. They were subject to low wages, lack of a social life, unfavorable working conditions, and unaccommodating work hours.

== In popular culture ==
La Grève des bonnes, a 1906 satire about French maids going on strike

One of the most in-depth and enduring representations of the lives of several types of maid was seen in the 1970s television drama Upstairs, Downstairs, set in England between 1903 and 1936. The lives of maids were well represented in the Downton Abbey series, set in England between 1912 and 1926 and shown from 2010 onward.

The American television drama The Gilded Age, set in the 1880s in New York City, depicts the lives of maids living and working in the great houses of the era.

The main characters in the NAMIC Vision Award-nominated television series Devious Maids are four housemaids.

== See also ==
- Au pair
- Charwoman
- Foreign domestic helpers in Hong Kong
- French maid
- Janitor
- Servant
- The Maid Narratives
