= Slavery in Syria =

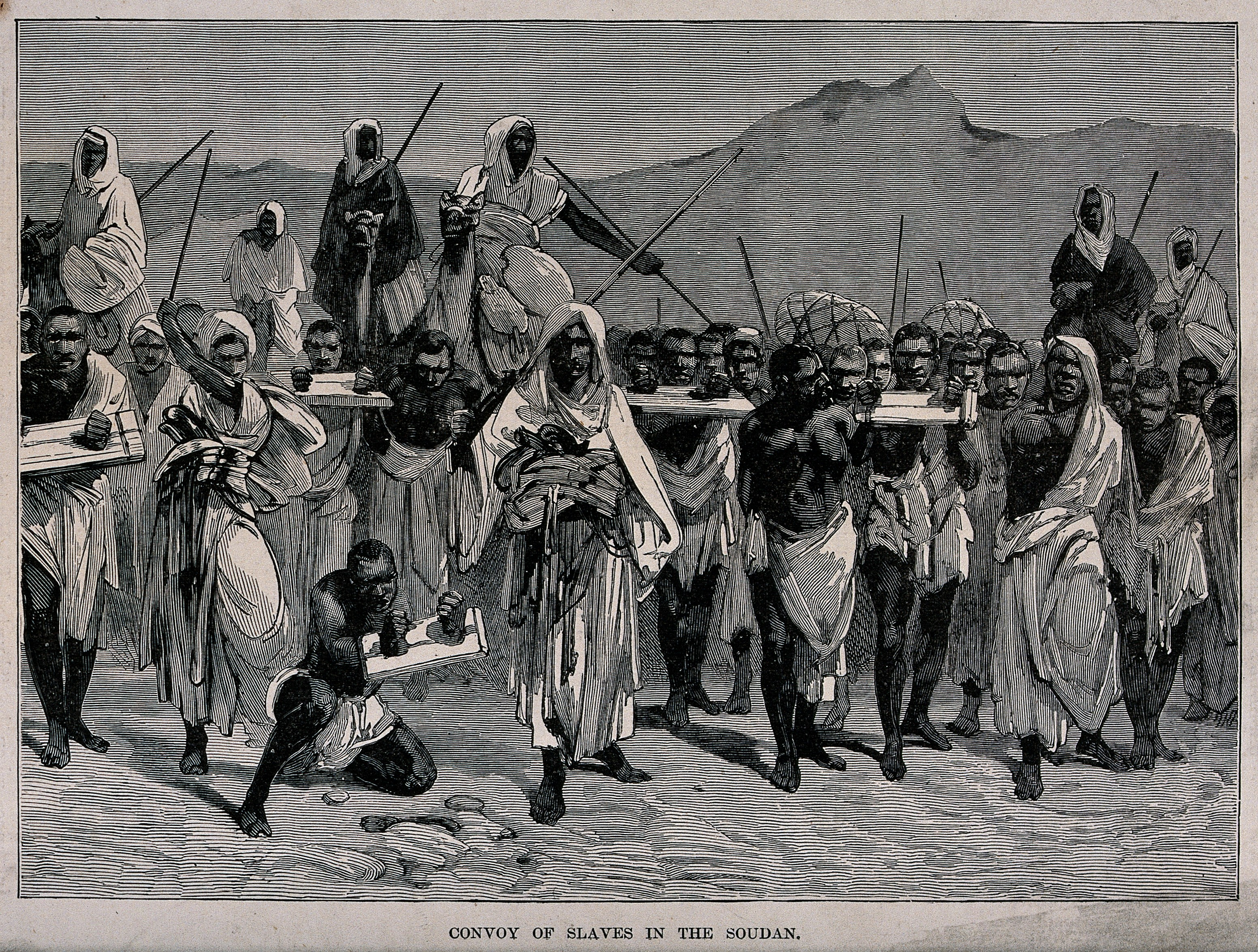
Arab slavers

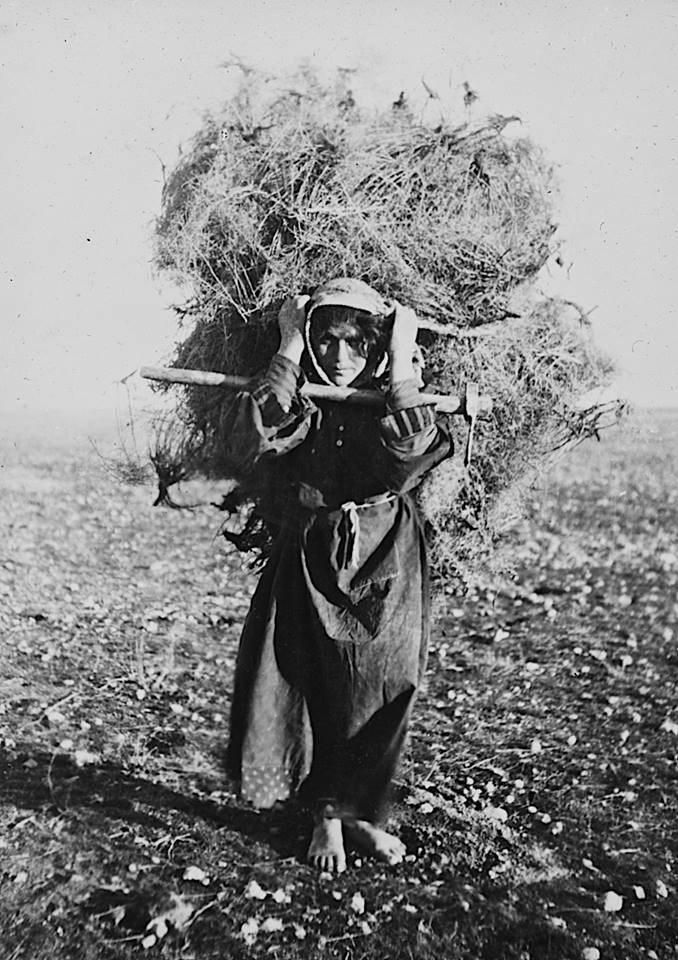
An Armenian woman in slavery after the genocide bears thistles to fuel home.

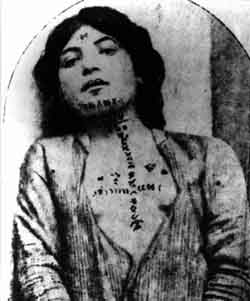
Armenian woman put up for auction, 1915

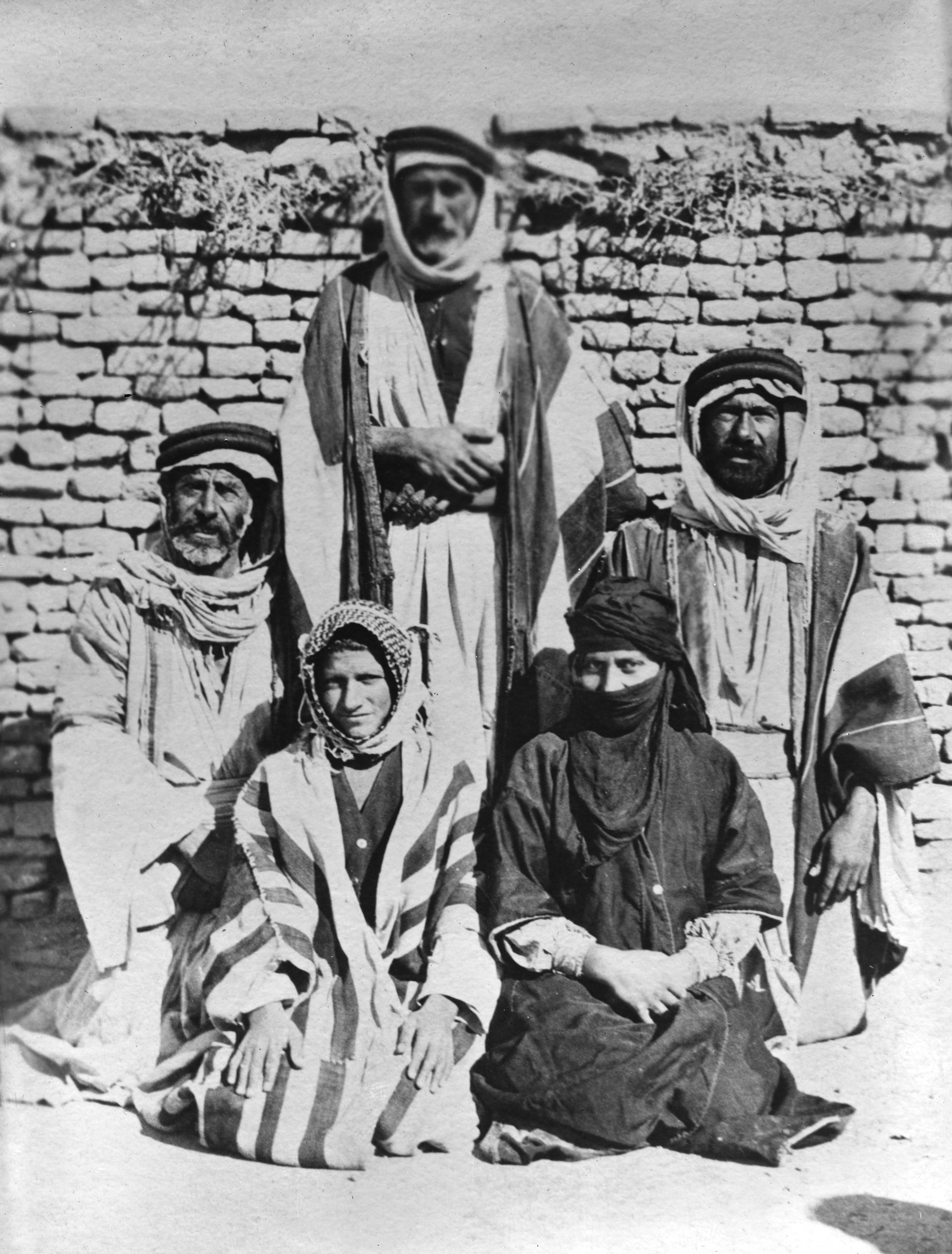
Islamized Armenians who were "rescued from Arabs" after the First World War and the Armenian genocide

Chattel slavery existed in the territory of the modern state of Syria until the 1920s.

Syria was one of the destinations of the Red Sea slave trade and the Indian Ocean slave trade of enslaved Africans until the late 19th century. During the Armenian genocide in 1915–1923, many Armenians were enslaved by Muslims in Ottoman Syria and Iraq, many of whom were liberated when the areas was conquered by the British during the first world war. Slavery was formally abolished in Syria by the French colonial authorities in 1931. Many members of the Afro-Syrian minority are descendants of the former slaves.

In the 21st century, Islamist extremists again practiced slavery in areas under their control in Syria and Iraq.

== Background ==
Present-day Syria was historically a part of many different states and cultures. The institution of slavery in the region of the later Iraq was reflected in the institution of slavery in the Rashidun Caliphate (632–661) slavery in the Umayyad Caliphate (661–750), slavery in the Abbasid Caliphate (750–1258), slavery in the Fatimid Caliphate, slavery in the Mamluk Sultanate (1260–1516) and finally slavery in the Ottoman Empire.

== Ottoman Syria (1516–1918) ==
=== Slave trade ===
==== Export ====
Syria both exported and imported slaves. There was a centuries-old export of Syrian girls. Ibn Battuta met a Syrian Arab Damascene girl who was a slave of a black African governor in Mali in the 14th century. Ibn Battuta engaged in a conversation with her in Arabic. The black man was a scholar of Islam and his name was Farba Sulayman.

In the 20th-century, women and girls for the harem market were kidnapped not only from Africa and Baluchistan, but also from the Trucial States, the Nusayriyah Mountains in Syria, and the Aden Protectorate.

In 1936, Saudi Arabia formally banned the import of slaves who were not already slaves prior to entering the kingdom, a reform which was however on paper only. King Ibn Saud officially expressed his willing cooperation with the anti -slavery policy of the British, but in 1940, the British were well aware that the king imported concubines from Syria, had received a gift of twenty slaves from Qatar and that British subjects from Baluchistan were trafficked to Saudi Arabia via Oman.

Syrian girls were trafficked from Syria to slavery in Saudi Arabia right before World War II and married to legally bring them across the border but then divorced and given to other men. A Syrian Dr. Midhat and Shaikh Yusuf were accused of engaging in this traffic of Syrian girls to supply them to Saudis.

==== Red Sea slave trade ====
A major slave route to Ottoman Syria was that of African slaves trafficked from the Red Sea slave trade to Jeddah, and by caravan via the Hajj pilgrime passage from Mecca over the desert to the slave market i Damascus in Syria, which received about 200 slaves annually.

The slave market in Damascus was held annually when the pilgrims returned home to Damascus from Hajj and the slave market of Mecca. A Western traveller described the Damascus slave market in the 1870s as smaller than those of Constantinople and Cairo, but that in contrast to them, it was held openly and not hidden away from foreigners, and that he witnessed the sale of African women and boy eunuchs as house slaves.

After a number of regulations against the slave trade caravans from Mecca by the local governor, only sixteen slaves were officially reported to have arrived at the Damascus slave market in the year of 1880.

==== Indian Ocea slave trade ====
One slave route to Ottoman Syria was the Indian Ocean slave trade by way of Ottoman Iraq.

In 1847, the British consulate in Baghdad reported:

The average import of slaves into Bussorah is 2000 head - in some years the numbers have reached 3000, but for the year 1836, owing, it is supposed, to the discouragement which the traffic has sustained from the Imam of Muscat, no more than 1000 slaves were imported. [...] Of the slaves imported, one half is usually sent to the Muntefik town on the Euphrates, named Sook-ess-Shookh, from whence they are spread all over Southern Mesopotamia, and Eastern Syria; a quarter are exported directly to Baghdad and the remainder are disposed of in the Bussorah market.

Ottoman Syria was a province close enough to Constantinople to be more affected by the official abolitionist policies to curb the slave trade initiated by the Ottoman regime during the Tanzimat Era than many other, and while the slave trade to Syria did not end, it slowed down during the late 19th-century, at least according to official reports.

==== Circassian slave trade ====
In the late Ottoman period, almost all slaves where of African origin. However, there was a small import of white slaves from the Black Sea. When the Crimean slave trade was discontinued, the Circassian slave trade continued to supply the area of Syria and Lebanon with white slaves.

The Anti-slavery Society reported from Beirut 25 January 1877:

"The sale of white Circassian female slaves is not carried on to any great extent in Syria, though not less than 100 of them are annually introduced into the country for the domestic use of the wealthy Moslems. It is the decided opinion of the writer that unless more efficacious measures be taken, the Turks will never consent to the abolition of slavery, it being an intrinsic part of their system".

==== Armenian slave trade ====
During the Armenian genocide in 1915–1923, many Armenians, primarily women, girls and boys under the age of twelve, were enslaved by Muslims in Ottoman Syria and Iraq. Throughout the genocide the men were given free licence to do as they pleased with Armenian women. Armenian women and children were displayed naked in auctions in Damascus, where they were sold as sex slaves. The trafficking of Armenian women as sex slaves was an important source of income for accompanying soldiers. In Arab areas, enslaved Armenian women were sold at low prices. The German consul at Mosul reported that the maximum price for an Armenian woman was "5 piastres" (about 20 Pence Sterling at the time).

=== Function and conditions ===
Female slaves were primarily used as either domestic servants, or as concubines (sex slaves), while male slaves were used in a number of tasks.

Slaves in Islam were mainly directed at the service sector – concubines and cooks, porters and soldiers – with slavery itself primarily a form of consumption rather than a factor of production. The most telling evidence for this is found in the gender ratio; among slaves traded in Islamic empire across the centuries, there were roughly two females to every male.

Outside of explicit sexual slavery, most female slaves had domestic occupations. Often, this also included sexual relations with their masters – a lawful motive for their purchase and the most common one.

In Ottoman Syria, it was common for wealthy people, both Muslims, Christians and Jews, to own enslaved African women used as domestic servants. According to Ottoman law, non-Muslims or dhimmi were not allowed to own slaves, but this prohibition was normally not enforced, especially not in Syria and Lebanon, which had a big Christian and Jewish population.

In May 1842 however, the Governor of Damascus, Najib Pasha, encouraged the Muslims to attack Christians and Jews to liberate their slaves, since sharia allowed only for Muslims to own slaves. On request from the European consuls, the Christian and Jewish communities then liberated their slaves, to avoid a violent attack from the Muslims. This parcial emancipation did however not affect the people enslaved by the Muslims.

In the 1870s, it was reported that there was about 5000 African slaves (women or boys) in Damascus alone, the majority of them women, as well as about 100 Circassian slave women imported each year.

== Activism against slave trade ==
The Ottoman Empire issued decrees to restrict and gradually prohibit the slave trade and slavery between 1830 and 1909 in response to Western pressure. The Firman of 1830 officially mandated liberation of white slaves; the Suppression of the slave trade in the Persian Gulf (1847) banned the import of African slaves via the Persian Gulf route; the Prohibition of the Circassian and Georgian slave trade (1854–1855) banned the import of white slaves; the Prohibition of the Black Slave Trade (1857) banned the import of African slaves regardless of route; and the Anglo-Ottoman Convention of 1880 gave the British permission to search all suspected slave ships on route to Ottoman harbours. Further more, the Disestablishment of the Istanbul Slave Market (1847), which closed the open slave market in the Ottoman capital, in practice advised the other Ottoman cities to remove the open slave markets indoors to conduct slave trade more discreetly. These laws were however not strictly enforced in the Ottoman provinces in practice. Islamic law permitted slave trade, which made it difficult to enforce the laws. Further, while the open slave trade was progressively more restricted, slavery itself remained legal.

The British liberated many enslaved Armenians when the occupied Ottoman Syria and Iraq during World War I. When the British conquered Aleppo, Deir Zor and Cilicia in 1918, many enslaved Armenian were liberated, bought free or voluntarily handed over to the British.

After the truce, the Ottoman government in Constantinople ordered the local governors in the Ottoman Empire to localise (enslaved) Christian women and children and hand them over to Christian bodies. Syria was de facto ruled by king Faisal I of Syria, who was a British ally and who ordered all Arabs to return (enslaved) Christian women and children to "their people".

Egyptian Armenians organized squads to rescue enslaved Armenians from Bedouins in Syria and Mesopotamia (Iraq); one of these, led by Rupen Herian, reported that they had liberated 533 enslaved women and children between June and August 1919.

Several actors, among them the League of Nations, the British Friends of Armenia, the Syrian Armenian Relief Society and Karen Jeppe, worked to ensure the liberation of the enslaved Armenians, some of them active as late as in the 1930s. In her report to the League of Nations in Geneva in May 1927, Karen Jeppe stated that 1600 enslaved Armenians had been liberated from slavery in a five-year period, foremost from Syria; however, many thousands of Armenians remained in slavery.

=== Abolition ===
In 1923, former Ottoman Syria was transformed in to the Mandate for Syria and the Lebanon under colonial French rule. On 20 July 1931, France ratified the 1926 Slavery Convention on behalf of both Syria and Lebanon, which was enforced on 25 June 1931. In 1956, Syria ratified the 1926 Slavery Convention a second time, this time as an independent nation.

Many members of the Afro-Syrian minority are descendants of the former slaves.

== 21st-century ==
For the revival of slavery in territories in Iraq and Syria occupied by the Islamic State in the 21st-century, see Slavery in 21st-century jihadism and Genocide of Yazidis by the Islamic State#Sexual slavery and reproductive violence.

== See also ==
- That Most Precious Merchandise: The Mediterranean Trade in Black Sea Slaves, 1260-1500
- Afro-Syrians
- Human trafficking in Syria
- Slavery and religion
- Islamic views on slavery
- History of slavery
- History of slavery in the Muslim world
- History of concubinage in the Muslim world
- Human trafficking in the Middle East
- Kafala system
- Slavery in 21st-century jihadism
- Slavery in Africa
- Slavery in Asia
- Slavery in Iraq
- Slavery in Mauritania
- Slavery in Oman
- Slavery in Saudi Arabia
- Slavery in Sudan

== Works cited ==
- Akçam, Taner (2012). The Young Turks' Crime against Humanity: The Armenian Genocide and Ethnic Cleansing in the Ottoman Empire. Princeton University Press. ISBN 978-0691153339.
- Segal, Ronald (2001). Islam's Black Slaves: The Other Black Diaspora. New York: Farrar, Straus and Giroux. ISBN 9780374527976.
