= Slavery in Lebanon =

Slavery existed in the territory of modern Lebanon until the 20th century. It was formally abolished by the French in 1931. Many members of the Afro-Arabian minority are descendants of the former slaves. Slavery of people from Africa and East Asia was succeeded by the modern Kafala system of poor workers from the same region where slaves had previously been imported.

== History ==
Historically, the institution of slavery in the region of the later Lebanon was reflected in the institution of slavery in the Rashidun Caliphate (632–661) slavery in the Umayyad Caliphate (661–750), slavery in the Abbasid Caliphate (750–1258), slavery in the Mamluk Sultanate (1258–1517) and finally slavery in the Ottoman Empire (1517–1918).

=== Ottoman Lebanon (1516–1920) ===
Lebanon belonged to Ottoman Empire in 1516–1920. African slaves were imported from the Red Sea slave trade via Damascus, and from the Trans-Saharan slave trade via Egypt; there were also a small import of Caucasian (mostly Circassian) girls for the rich. Eunuchs and female slaves were used for domestic service in private households (harems).

The Ottoman Empire issued decrees to restrict and gradually prohibit the slave trade and slavery between 1830 and 1909 in response to Western pressure. The Firman of 1830 officially mandated liberation of white slaves; the Suppression of the slave trade in the Persian Gulf (1847) banned the import of African slaves via the Persian Gulf route; the Prohibition of the Circassian and Georgian slave trade (1854–1855) banned the import of white slaves; the Prohibition of the Black Slave Trade (1857) banned the import of African slaves regardless of route; and the Anglo-Ottoman Convention of 1880 gave the British permission to search all suspected slave ships on route to Ottoman harbours. Furthermore, the Disestablishment of the Istanbul Slave Market (1847), which closed the open slave market in the Ottoman capital, in practice advised the other Ottoman cities to remove the open slave markets indoors to conduct slave trade more discreetly. These laws were however, not strictly enforced in the Ottoman provinces in practice. Islamic law permitted slave trade, which made it difficult to enforce the laws. Further, while the open slave trade was progressively more restricted, slavery itself remained legal.

By the 1870s, the slave market in Beirut was conducted away from the public eye and mainly consisted of private importation and private sale. In 1877, there were about 4,500 "negresses" in the private households in Beirut, with an average of 450 being imported annually, in addition to about 100 white (Circassian) women each year.

The Prohibition of the Black Slave Trade had formally banned the import of African slaves in 1857, which gave the British an opportunity to interfere in the slave trade. The British Consul-General in Beirut attempted to interfere in the slave trade in Beirut, but rarely with success, since slavery as such was not banned. On one occasion, the Consul Mr. J. Eldridge made an attempt to liberate a "negro lad" who had fallen victim to the slave trade, and the case took six months before he finally succeeded.

It was noted that runaway slaves, mostly "negresses", sought refuge at the British Consulate in this period, but that there was in practice very little he was legally able to do to help, and that he was often forced to hand over the slave to the Ottoman authorities, who then returned her to her enslaver: "All he can do is to bring the matter to the knowledge of the local authorities, deliver the poor creature to them, and ask them to do her justice, which request is always met with kind, but vague, promises. When once the victim is given up to the officer in charge she is sure either to return to her masters house, where she is kept under double custody, but if she should escape again, or in case of her master not wishing to keep her anymore, she is sent to a neighbouring city to be sold."

By the late 19th-century, almost all slaves in Beirut where of African origin, since all other slave routes had been stopped by then. An exception was the Circassian slave trade, that still supplied rich men in Beirut with a small minority of white slaves. The Anti-slavery Society reported from Beirut 25 January 1877:

"The sale of white Circassian female slaves is not carried on to any great extent in Syria, though not less than 100 of them are annually introduced into the country for the domestic use of the wealthy Moslems. It is the decided opinion of the writer that unless more efficacious measures be taken, the Turks will never consent to the abolition of slavery, it being an intrinsic part of their system".

=== Abolition ===
Open slavery became defunct in practice when Lebanon and Syria was transformed in to the French Mandate for Syria and the Lebanon (1923–1946), and on 20 July 1931, France ratified the 1926 Slavery Convention on behalf of both Syria and Lebanon, which was enforced on 25 June 1931.

Many members of the Afro-Lebanese minority are descendants of the former slaves. After the abolition of slavery, poor migrant workers were employed under the Kafala system, which have been compared to slavery.

== After abolition ==
Before the start of the Lebanese Civil War young girls, aged ten and upwards, who came from poor Lebanese families or from other countries such as Syria, Palestine and Egypt were employed in Lebanese households. The girl's parents collected their salary annually though the girls remained with their employers until they got married. Following the beginning of the Lebanese Civil War, many Arab domestic workers decided to leave due to a general economic decline and a crisis in security. That in turn left a gap in the country's domestic workforce. A change in situation came about with the arrival of African and Asian migrant workers. The first migrants arrived in the late 1970s. Initially, the highest percentage of migrant workers were male until that is the 1980s and early 1990s when an increasing feminization of the migrant labour force became evident.

The migrants, mostly from Sri Lanka and Philippine, arrived together in large groups through both illegal and semi-legal channels.

=== Kafala system ===
The Kafala system is a sponsorship arrangement in which a sponsor assumes legal responsibility for a migrant domestic worker during the contract period, resulting in the worker's legal dependence on the sponsor. The Kafala system is not legally binding in Lebanon because recruiters cannot act as a sponsor. Instead the system is made up of a number for administrative regulations, customary practices and legal requirements which bind the worker to the recruiter temporarily.. Once in Lebanon, the migrant domestic worker is assigned an employer. A worker may not change employer or break the terms of the contract unless the employer signs a release waiver. This must be done before a notary public and Lebanese authorities give an official release. A worker becomes illegal if they leave without the consent of their sponsor and the official release from the authorities. Human Rights Watch has said that the Kafala system in Lebanon puts workers at risk of exploitation and abuse, while Anti-Slavery International has said that the system is one of the major causes of vulnerability of migrant workers. The Kafala system means that the sponsor of the migrant domestic worker is legally responsible for the migrant and the state's responsibility for 'alien surveillance' is then passed on to the employer.

In April 2019, Amnesty International urged Lebanon government to end the Kafala system which has led to the abuse of thousands of domestic workers in the Mediterranean country.

By suspending the implementation of a new standard unified contract, Lebanon's State Shura Council caused a sharp blow to the migrant domestic worker rights. The new contract allowed workers to terminate their contract without the consent of their employer, dismantling a key abusive aspect of the kafala system.

== See also ==
- Human trafficking in Lebanon
- History of slavery in the Muslim world
- History of concubinage in the Muslim world
- Human trafficking in the Middle East
