= House slave =

Slavery by type

A house slave was a slave who worked, and often lived, in the house of the slave-owner, performing domestic labor. House slaves performed essentially the same duties as all domestic workers throughout history, such as cooking, cleaning, serving meals, and caring for children; however, their slave status could expose them to more significant abuses, including physical punishments and use for sexual slavery.

== In antiquity ==
In classical antiquity, many civilizations had house slaves.

=== In Greece ===
The study of slavery in Ancient Greece remains a complex subject, in part because of the many different levels of servility, from traditional chattel slavery through various forms of serfdom, such as Helots, Penestai, and several other classes of a non-citizen.

Athens had various categories of slave, such as:

- House-slaves, living in their master's home and working at home, on the land, or in a shop.
- Freelance slaves, who didn't live with their master but worked in their master's shop or fields and paid him taxes from the money they got from their own properties (insofar as society allowed slaves to own property).
- Public slaves, who worked as police officers, ushers, secretaries, street-sweepers, etc.
- War captives (andrapoda) who served primarily in unskilled tasks at which they could be chained: for example, rowers in commercial ships or miners.

Houseborn slaves (oikogeneis) often constituted a privileged class. They were, for example, entrusted to take the children to school; they were "pedagogues" in the first sense of the term. Some of them were the offspring of the master of the house, but in most cities, notably Athens, a child inherited the status of its mother.

==== Sexual reproduction and "breeding" ====
The Greeks did not breed their slaves during the Classical Era. However, the proportion of house-born slaves seems to have been relatively large in Ptolemaic Egypt and in manumission inscriptions at Delphi. Sometimes, the cause of this was natural; mines, for instance, were exclusively a male domain.

Also known as a writer of Socratic dialogues, Xenophon advised that male and female slaves should be lodged separately, that "nor children born and bred by our domestics without our knowledge and consent—no unimportant matter, since, if the act of rearing children tends to make good servants still more loyally disposed, cohabiting but sharpens ingenuity for mischief in the bad." The explanation is perhaps economic; even a skilled slave was cheap, so it may have been cheaper to purchase a slave than to raise one. Additionally, childbirth placed the enslaved mother's life at risk, and the baby was not guaranteed to survive to adulthood.

==== In Socratic dialogues and Greek plays ====
A house slave appears in the Socratic dialogue, Meno, which was written by Plato. At the beginning of the dialogue, the slave's master, Meno, fails to benefit from Socratic teaching and reveals himself to be intellectually savage. Socrates turns to the house-slave, who is a boy ignorant of geometry. The boy acknowledges his ignorance, learns from his mistakes, and finally establishes proof of the desired geometric theorem. This is another example of the slave appearing more clever than his master, a popular theme in Greek literature.

The comedies of Menander show how the Athenians preferred to view a house slave: as an enterprising and unscrupulous rascal, who must use his wits to profit from his master, rescue him from his troubles, or gain him the girl of his dreams. Most of these plays survive in translations by Plautus and Terence, suggesting that the Romans liked the same genre.

== In the Americas ==
The leader of the Haitian Revolution, Toussaint L'Ouverture, was a former house slave.

=== Haiti ===
In Haiti, before leading the Haitian Revolution, Toussaint Louverture had been a house slave.

Toussaint is thought to have been born on the plantation of Bréda at Haut de Cap in Saint-Domingue, owned by the Comte de Noé and later managed by Bayon de Libertat. Tradition says that he was a driver and horse trainer on the plantation. His master freed him at age 33 when Toussaint married Suzanne. He was a fervent Catholic, and a member of high degree of the Masonic Lodge of Saint-Domingue. In 1790 slaves in the Plaine du Flowera rose in rebellion. Different forces coalesced under different leaders. Toussaint served with other leaders and rose in responsibility. On 4 April 1792, the French Legislative Assembly extended full rights of citizenship to free people of color or mulattoes (gens de couleur libres) and free blacks.

=== United States ===
In many households, the treatment of slaves varied according to the slave's skin color. Darker-skinned slaves worked in the fields, while lighter-skinned house servants had comparatively better clothing, food and housing. Referred to as "house negroes", they had a higher status and standard of living than a field slave or "field negro" who worked outdoors.

As in Thomas Jefferson's household, the presence of lighter-skinned slaves as household servants was not merely an issue of skin color. Sometimes planters used mixed-race slaves as house servants or favored artisans because they were their children or other relatives. Several of Jefferson's household slaves were possibly children of his father-in-law John Wayles and the enslaved woman Betty Hemings, whom Jefferson's wife inherited upon her father's death. In turn, Jefferson had sexual relations with the daughter of Betty and John Wayles, Sally Hemings, the half-sister to Thomas Jefferson's wife. The Hemings children grew up to be closely involved in Jefferson's household staff activities. Two sons trained as carpenters. Three of his four surviving mixed-race children with Sally Hemings passed into white society as adults.

The term "house negro" appears in print by 1711. On 21 May of that year, The Boston News-Letter advertised that "A Young House-Negro Wench of 19 Years of Age that speaks English to be Sold." In a 1771 letter, a Maryland slave-owner compared the lives of his slaves to those of "house negroes" and "plantation negroes", refuting an accusation that his slaves were poorly fed by saying they were fed as well as "plantation negroes", though not as well as the "house negroes". In 1807, a report of the African Institution of London described an incident in which an old woman was required to work in the field after she refused to throw salt-water and gunpowder on the wounds of other slaves who had been whipped. According to the report, she had previously enjoyed a favored status as a "house negro".

Margaret Mitchell made use of the term to describe a slave named Pork in her famed 1936 Southern plantation fiction, Gone with the Wind.

African-American activist Malcolm X commented on the cultural connotations and consequences of the term in his 1963 speech "Message to the Grass Roots", wherein he explained that during slavery, there were two types of slaves: "house negroes" who worked in the master's house, and "field negroes" who performed outdoor manual labor. He characterized the house negro as having a better life than the field negro, thus being unwilling to leave the plantation and potentially more likely to support existing power structures that favored whites over blacks. Malcolm X identified with the field negro.

=== Use in contemporary politics ===
House negro has been used in the contemporary era as a pejorative term to compare a contemporary black person to such a slave. The term has been used to demean individuals, in critiques of attitudes within the African-American community, especially against politically right-leaning African-Americans, and as a borrowed term in contemporary social critique.

In New Zealand in 2012, Hone Harawira, a Member of Parliament and leader of the socialist Mana Party, aroused controversy after referring to Maori MPs from the ruling New Zealand National Party as "little house niggers" during a heated debate on electricity privatisation, and Waitangi Tribunal claims.

In June 2017, white American comedian Bill Maher used the term self-referentially during a live broadcast interview with Ben Sasse, saying, "Work in the fields? Senator, I'm a house nigger [...]. It's a joke!" Maher apologized for the comment.

In April 2018, Wisconsin State Senator Lena Taylor used the term during a dispute with a bank teller. When the teller refused to cash a check for insufficient funds, Taylor called the teller a "house nigger". Both Taylor and the teller are African Americans.

== In the Muslim Middle East ==
In the history of slavery in the Muslim world, domestic servitude was one of the driving forces behind the slave trade. The ideal of Islamic sex segregation made it difficult for free Muslim women to work as servants, at the same time, the sex segregation made it difficult for male servants to access the harem women's quarter of the house, resulting in difficulty in Muslim women to have access to domestic servants. This dilemma resulted in the Muslim world using slaves for domestic servants rather than free servants. By Islamic law, slaves owned by Muslims were to be foreign non-Muslims (kafirs) who were by definition legitimate targets for enslavement, since the Muslim world of dar al-islam was by definition at war with the non-Muslim world of dar al-harb. Female slaves were thus not subjected to the same Islamic customs. It also made it possible for male slaves to be made eunuchs. This solved both the dilemma of female servants being able to work in the household of a family as well as for a male servant to enter the women's quarter of a home. The slave trade to the Muslim world prioritized women and children, though men were also trafficked. In bigger households there were typically a mix of male and female house slaves.

=== Male house slaves ===
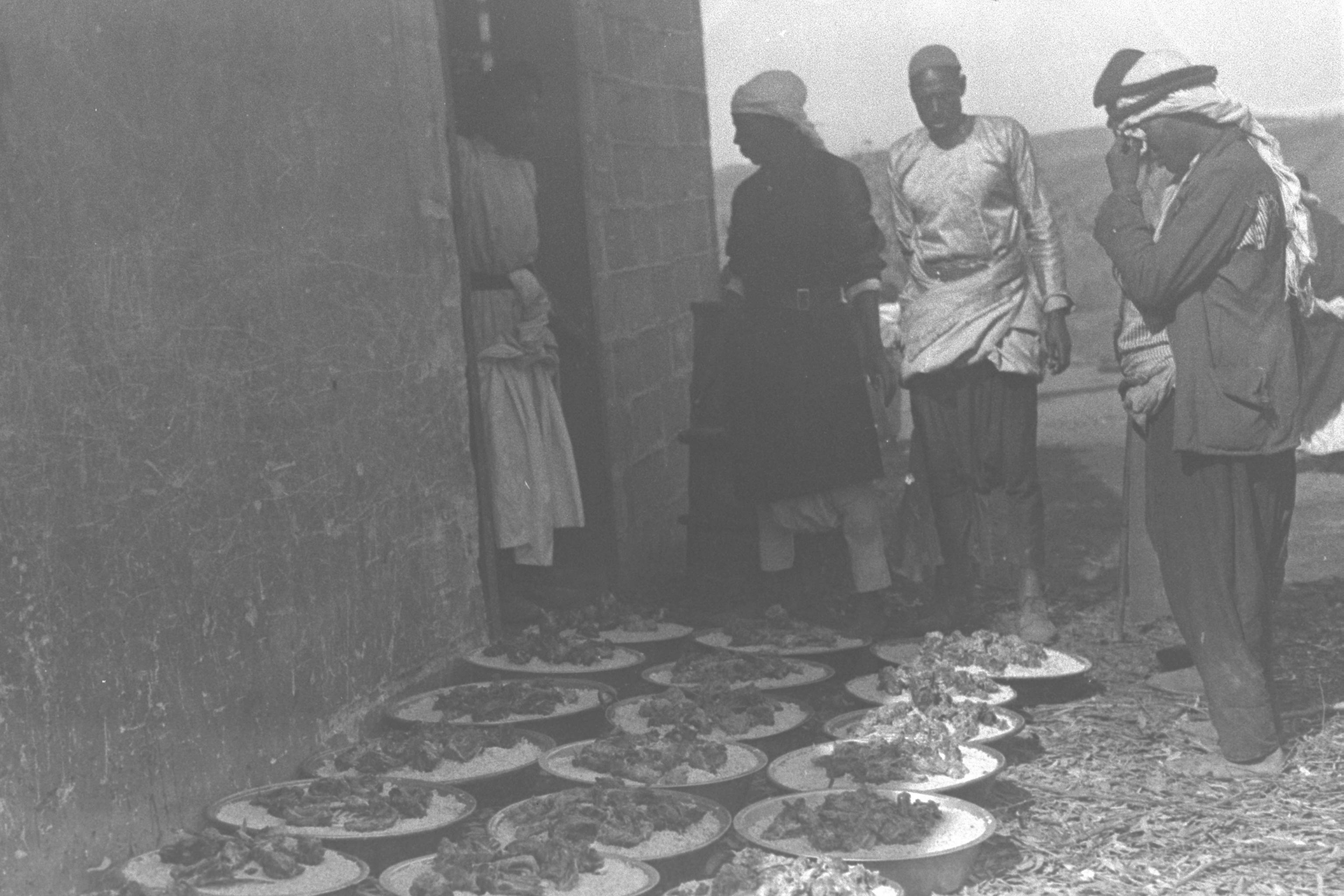
Servants waiting to serve bowls of rice and roast lamb to guests attending an Arab farmer's wedding in the Negev, 1933.

Male domestic slaves were used for gardening, stable hands, carpenters, blacksmiths and for a number of craftsmanships and household repair work. Male domestic slaves were also typically used for gardening work, such as the commonly cultivated palm trees and date trees that was often cultivates by private households in the gardens.

Male domestic slaves served the male members of the family in the Majlis in the male quarters of the house, made and served coffee to male guests in the Majlis, accompanied their masters outside of the house as bodyguards. Male domestic slaves were typically used as messengers and errands to the outside world for both men and women of the family, and referred to as Mtareesh (Mitrash) eller Merassil (Mersal), "messengers"; they acted as links between households, families and tribes, bringing messengers of weddings, birth, sickness, death and invitations between families, gifts and trade goods between households.

Male domestic slaves in the Muslim world were often eunuchs. Being eunuchs, they could move freely between both the male and women's quarter of the house and could be used for a number of different tasks, which made them very valuable slaves in the Muslim world. The custom of using eunuchs as servants for women inside the Islamic harems had a preceding example in the life of Muhammad himself, who used the eunuch Mabur as a servant in the house of his own slave concubine Maria al-Qibtiyya; both of them slaves from Egypt.

=== Female house slaves ===
In the Islamic world, female slaves were normally purchased for one of two reasons: for the purpose of sexual slavery as concubines or as domestic servants, and used for service in the harems. Female slaves used for sexual services, concubines, were referred to by a number of different terms such as surriya or jariya. In Islamic custom, the principle that legitimized the right to sexual intercourse was the term of the man's ownership of the woman's sexual organs: which within marriage was represented by a marriage contract, and outside of marriage by the ownership of a slave girl. Female slaves could be bought by a man for sex, or for his wife as a domestic servant, or they could be directly bought by a woman, which gave them different rights. A Muslim man was by Islamic law allowed to have sexual intercourse with a female slave whom he owned, though not with a slave owned by his wife. In the era of slavery in al-Andalus, female slaves were physically examined by matrons employed by the muntashib and categorized as 'distinguished', which meant they were deemed suitable to be sold for sexual slavery or as entertainers; or as 'gross', which meant they were classified as suited only to be sold as house slaves for household work. Female domestic slaves were often slave women who had previously been used as concubines, and who, when they were no longer considered useful as concubines, were now used for domestic labor, serving the slave concubines and wives in the harem of their enslaver.

Women domestic slaves were purchased to the harems to the perform chores for the sex segregated women in the harem. Women domestic slaves were used for all sort of household chores normally performed by women, and could also be sent outside of the harem to perform tasks for the harem women in the city outside of the home. Black African women were most commonly used for domestic slave labor in Egypt, the Arab world and the Ottoman Empire. In the Islamic Middle East, African women – trafficked via the trans-Saharan slave trade, the Red Sea slave trade and the Indian Ocean slave trade – were primarily used as domestic house servants and not exclusively for sexual slavery, while white women, trafficked via the Black Sea slave trade and Circassian slave trade, where preferred for use as concubines (sex slaves) or wives, and there was therefore a constant demand for them in the Middle East. The women of the family monitored the work of the domestic slaves, decided what to do with the leftovers of food, and made sure that the slaves performed the Islamic prayers.

The household of the Royal Harems were essentially a larger version of the men of other classes. It was normal for Islamic royal dynasties to use slave concubines for procreation. By Islamic law the sexual intercourse between a Muslim man and his female slave was not defined as extramarital sex (zina), and if the father chose to acknowledge paternity, the child was born free and its mother umm walad and free upon his death. Because of this, Islamic dynasties often used slave concubines for procreation to avoid in-laws. Royal harems often purchased many slave girls, of which some were selected to become concubines, and the rest were used for domestic service. In the slavery in the Ottoman Empire such domestic harem slaves were referred to as odalisque. Female slaves were rarely manumitted unless they were arranged to be married to a Muslim man, since women could not survive on their own in a Muslim society.

=== Sexual reproduction and "breeding" ===
The customary Islamic sex segregation was, albeit in a lower degree, observed also for the slaves when possible. Female slaves were normally kept away from contact with (non-eunuch) male slaves, unless their enslavers arranged for two slaves to marry each other in order to produce more slaves for their masters. Enslavers sometimes bought women slaves in order to marry them to male slaves to produce slave children; the slave children would commonly be selected to be playmates to the children of the enslaver's family, and then became the personal slave servant of the child when they became adult.

=== Legacy ===
Most of the Middle East were included in the Ottoman Empire. When the slavery in the Ottoman Empire were nominally abolished by the Kanunname of 1889, the former house slaves normally continued to work as nominally free maidservants; their employers could however now fire them instead of selling them on the slave market, creating a class of free servants. After the closure of the slave market Avret Pazarları in Constantinople by the Disestablishment of the Istanbul Slave Market, the Young Turks founded the Hizmetçi İdaresi as a Servant Institution to assist former female slaves to find employment as domestic workers and maidservants in order to escape prostitution to survive, though the institution is reported to have functioned, in practice, as a slave market.

House slaves were used in the Muslim Middle East until the mid 20th-century. Despite the Ottoman anti slavery reforms introduced in the 19th-century, chattel slavery continued to exist in the former Ottoman provinces in the Middle East after the dissolution of the Ottoman Empire in 1917–1920: while slavery in Egypt was phased out after the ban of the slave trade in 1877–1884, existing slaves were noted as late as 1931; slavery in Iraq was banned after British pressure in 1924; slavery in Jordan was ended by the British in 1929; slavery in Lebanon as well as slavery in Syria was banned by the French in 1931; slavery in Palestine still existed under the guise of clientage in 1934; slavery in Libya still existed in 1930s; and slavery in Saudi Arabia lasted until it was abolished after pressure from the US in 1962, with slavery in Yemen being banned between 1962 and 1967.

After the abolition of slavery in the Middle East, chattel slavery was succeeded by the kafala system. In the 21st-century, foreign women are employed in Saudi Arabia, Kuwait, Qatar, Lebanon, Singapore, Hong Kong, Japan and United Arab Emirates in large numbers to work as maids or other roles of domestic service, and are often vulnerable to multiple forms of abuse. In Qatar, Asian workers employed via the kafala system were employed as mostly as housemaids and low-skilled workers and in the United Arab Emirates, the labor previously performed by slaves were now performed by poor migrant workers employed under the Kafala system, which has been compared to slavery.

The Afro-Arabs of the Middle East are sometimes referred to by the term abeed, which is a pejorative term for slave. Many members of the Black Palestinian minority are descendants of the former slaves. The community in northern Jericho have often been called "the slaves of Duyuk" even in modern times. The African Palestinians who now live in the two compounds near al-Aqsa mosque have called the area home since 1930. They have experienced prejudice, with some Palestinian Arabs referring to them as "slaves" (abeed) and to their neighbourhood as the "slaves' prison" (habs al-abeed).

== See also ==
- Slave breeding in the United States
- Slavery in ancient Rome
- Slavery in ancient Egypt
- History of concubinage in the Muslim world
- Houseboy
- Uncle Tom § Epithet, another term used for an overly subservient black person
