= Treaty of Jeddah (1927) =

Treaty between Great Britain and Ibn Saud, King of Hejaz and Nejd

- The letters attached to the treaty, along with the subsequent modifications

The 1927 Treaty of Jeddah, formally the Treaty between His Majesty and His Majesty the King of the Hejaz and of Nejd and Its Dependencies was signed between the United Kingdom and Ibn Saud.

It was signed by Sir Gilbert Clayton on behalf of the United Kingdom and Prince Faisal bin Abdulaziz on behalf of Kingdom of Hejaz and Nejd on 20 May 1927. The treaty recognized the independence of Ibn Saud and sovereignty over what was then known as the Kingdom of Hejaz and Nejd. The two regions were unified into the Kingdom of Saudi Arabia in 1932. In return, Ibn Saud agreed to stop his forces from attacking and harassing neighbouring British protectorates.

The Treaty of Jeddah also addressed the issue of the Red Sea slave trade of Africans to slavery in the Kingdom of Hejaz. The King formally agreed to cooperate with the British Legation in fighting the slave trade. Article 7 of the treaty explicitly stipulated the right of the British Legation in Jeddah to manumit enslaved Africans seeking asylum, and according to the British Foreign Office, 263 Africans were freed in this way between 1926 and 1938.

The Treaty superseded the 1915 Treaty of Darin.

It was published in Treaty Series No. 25 (1927), Command 2951 and was slightly modified by two further exchanges of Notes in 1936 (Treaty Series No. 10 (1937) Command 5380) and 1943 (Treaty Series No. 13 (1947), Command 7064).

== See also ==
- Anglo-Ottoman Convention of 1880
