= Human trafficking in Syria =

Incidents and responses to trafficking of Syrian women and children

As of 2008, Ba'athist Syria was a destination and transit country for women and children trafficked for commercial sexual exploitation and forced labor. A significant number of women and children in the large and expanding Iraqi refugee community in Syria were reportedly forced into commercial sexual exploitation by Iraqi gangs or, in some cases, their families. Similarly, women from Somalia and Eastern Europe were trafficked into commercial sexual exploitation. Foreign women recruited for work in Syria as cabaret dancers were not permitted to leave their work premises without permission, and they had their passports withheld - indicators of involuntary servitude. Some of these women may also have been forced into prostitution. Anecdotal evidence suggests that Syria may have been a destination for sex tourism from other countries in the region. In addition, women from Indonesia, the Philippines, Ethiopia, and Sierra Leone were recruited for work in Syria as domestic servants, but some face conditions of involuntary servitude, including long hours, non-payment of wages, withholding of passports, restrictions on movement, threats, and physical or sexual abuse. Syria may also have been a transit point for Iraqi women and girls trafficked to Kuwait, the United Arab Emirates (U.A.E.), and Lebanon for forced prostitution. The Assad regime did not fully comply with the minimum standards for the elimination of trafficking and did not make significant efforts to do so. Syria again failed to report any law enforcement efforts to punish trafficking offenses over the last year. In addition, the government did not offer protection services to victims of trafficking and may have arrested, prosecuted, or deported some victims for prostitution or immigration violations.

The U.S. State Department's Office to Monitor and Combat Trafficking in Persons placed the country in "Tier 3" in 2017 and 2023, noting that it was one of eleven countries which were seen as having a documented government policy or pattern of human trafficking.

By mid-2024, Syria has not ratified the 2000 UN TIP Protocol.

== Prosecution (2008) ==
The Government of Syria made no discernible efforts to criminally punish trafficking crimes during 2008. Syria does not specifically prohibit any form of trafficking in persons, but its government could use statutes against kidnapping, pimping, and sexual assault to prosecute some trafficking cases. In addition, Article 3 of Law 10 of 1961 prohibits prostituting a minor less than 16 years old, with a prescribed penalty of one to seven years’ imprisonment. This penalty is sufficiently stringent and commensurate with the penalty for other grave crimes, such as rape. Decree 81 sets guidelines for conditions of domestic workers; prescribed penalties for violation are imprisonment for an unspecified length of time or fines of only $2, which are not sufficiently stringent to deter the offense of forced labor. During this reporting period, Syria did not report any investigations, arrests, prosecutions, convictions, or punishments of trafficking offenses. In addition, despite reports that many police officials take bribes to ignore prostitution, the government reported no law enforcement efforts to combat government complicity in trafficking.

== Protection (2008) ==
During the year 2009 the Syrian government made limited progress in protecting trafficking victims. The government does not have a shelter to protect victims of trafficking, but in December, the Ministry of Social Affairs and Labor approved the opening of an International Organization for Migration (IOM)-operated shelter. The government also approved the creation of a formal system for police, immigration officers, judges, and other government officials to refer victims of trafficking to the planned IOM shelter; to date, no one has been referred by the government to an existing shelter run by Caritas Syria. The government continues to lack formal victim identification procedures to identify potential trafficking victims among vulnerable populations, such as illegal migrants or women arrested for prostitution. As a result, victims of trafficking were arrested and charged with prostitution or violating immigration laws. Anecdotal reports also suggest that some foreign women in prison on prostitution charges have been beaten by prison officials. Another source reported that Syrian authorities will often release incarcerated Iraqi women and minors in prostitution to their traffickers. Child victims of commercial sexual exploitation are housed in juvenile detention facilities, rather than referred to protective services offered by NGOs. Syria does not actively encourage victims to assist in investigations or prosecutions of their traffickers and does not provide foreign victims with legal alternatives to their removal to countries in which they may face hardship or retribution. The government does not fund anti-trafficking training for law enforcement officers, but officials from the Ministry of Interior received training organized and funded by IOM on victim sensitivity.

== Prevention (2008) ==
Syria took minimal steps to prevent trafficking over the year. In January 2008, the Ministry of Interior co-sponsored with IOM a three-day conference designed to raise awareness among parliamentarians and journalists on trafficking. In addition, Syria did not conduct any public awareness campaigns to educate employers and workers on the rights of domestic workers. Syria also did not take any measures to reduce the demand for commercial sex acts. Similarly, the government did not undertake any public awareness campaigns targeting citizens traveling to known child sex tourism destinations abroad.

== See also ==
- Human rights in Syria
- Slavery in Syria
- Abduction of Syrian children and the role of Western charity organizations
