= Disestablishment of the Istanbul Slave Market =

1847 Ottoman Imperial decree

The Disestablishment of the Istanbul Slave Market was an Imperial decree (firman; Turkish: ferman) issued by Sultan Abdülmecid I in 1847. The edict closed the public slave market in the Ottoman capital of Istanbul. The reform was a cosmetic one and removed the visible slave trade in the capital by moving it from the street to indoors, thereby making it less visible to foreign criticism during the Tanzimat modernization era.

== Background and firman ==
It was one of a number of reforms that officially abolished slavery in the Ottoman Empire, including the Firman of 1830, Disestablishment of the Istanbul Slave Market (1847), Suppression of the slave trade in the Persian Gulf (1847), the Prohibition of the Circassian and Georgian slave trade (1854–1855), Prohibition of the Black Slave Trade (1857), and the Anglo-Ottoman Convention of 1880.

The Firman was issued at a time when the Ottoman Empire was subject to growing diplomatic pressure from the West to suppress the slave trade and slavery in the Ottoman Empire. In the 1840s, the slave market in Istanbul was the biggest in the Ottoman Empire and Europe. Slaves were trafficked to it from the Circassian slave trade, the Trans-Saharan slave trade, the Red Sea slave trade and the Indian Ocean slave trade. The public sale of slaves in the Ottoman capital shocked foreign visitors from the West and created bad publicity for the Ottoman Empire, which was painted as barbaric. In the market bazaar for female slaves, the Avret Pazarları, for example, slave girls were exposed naked on the auction block and tied in position for prospective buyers to inspect.

The edict ordered the closure of the public slave market in Istanbul. The slave market was closed from December 1846, during the 1846–1847 financial year. The edict resulted in the end of the visible slave market in Istanbul. The consequence was that the slave market in Istanbul was no longer visible to foreign visitors or the subject of criticism and bad publicity, contributing to a more modern image of the Ottoman capital consistent with the modernization efforts of the Tanzimat era.

However, the reform was mainly a cosmetic one. Neither the slave trade as such or the institution of slavery itself was banned when the public slave market in Constantinople was closed. The slave market in Istanbul simply moved indoors, away from the visibility of foreigners, and now took place in the private houses and homes of the slave traders rather than in an open public slave market. Formally illegal, it was clandestinely tolerated. A foreign visitor in Istanbul commented in 1869, that while the public sale of slaves in the city had ended twenty years before, the slave market in the city was known to still be in operation away from public scrutiny. The reform in fact worsened the conditions of the slave market, by moving it away from state control and supervision.

The example of the Disestablishment of the Istanbul Slave Market, where the open slave market was closed in favor of less visible and more discreet slave trade in the houses of the slave traders, was a development which was gradually followed by most of the other big cities in the Ottoman Empire, were the slave trade went underground during the last decades of the 19th-century.

When slave trade itself was formally banned by the Kanunname of 1889, former house slaves continued to work as house servants: there was no difference in their status, and domestic servants were viewed as synonymous with slaves. However, they became easier to dispose of by firing them, which created a class of free domestic servants. The state institution Hizmetçi İdaresi was established as a work agency for domestic servants, which in practice functioned as a slave market. The working conditions of the new class of free domestic servants were not to become good, and in many parts of the Ottoman Empire were to develop in to the kafala system.

== See also ==
- Firman of 1854
- Anglo-Egyptian Slave Trade Convention
