= Suppression of the slave trade in the Persian Gulf =

1847 Firman by the Ottoman Empire

The Suppression of the slave trade in the Persian Gulf, refers to the Imperial Firman or Ferman (Decree) issued by Sultan Abdülmecid I in 1847. It formally prohibited the import of African slaves to Ottoman territory via the Indian Ocean slave trade of the Persian Gulf. The decree did not address the other slave trade routes trafficking slaves to the Empire.

== Background and firman ==
It was one of the reforms representing the process of official abolition of slavery in the Ottoman Empire, including the Firman of 1830, Disestablishment of the Istanbul Slave Market (1847), Suppression of the slave trade in the Persian Gulf (1847), the Prohibition of the Circassian and Georgian slave trade (1854–1855), Prohibition of the Black Slave Trade (1857), and the Anglo-Ottoman Convention of 1880.

The Firman was issued in a time period when the Ottoman Empire was subjected to a growing diplomatic pressure from the West to suppress slave trade and slavery in the Ottoman Empire. Abolitionist policy was also consistent with the modernization reform efforts of the Tanzimat era.

In January 1847, the Sultan formally prohibited the import of African slaves via the Persian Gulf in to Ottoman territory. Specifically this concerned Ottoman Iraq. The Sultan ordered his Governor in Baghdad to prohibit the import of slaves from the Persian Gulf under Ottoman flag, and gave permission to the British to control suspected slave ships and liberate any potential slaves in the Persian Gulf.

The edict was however mainly nominal. In 1847, the British consulate in Baghdad reported:

The average import of slaves into Bussorah is 2000 head - in some years the numbers have reached 3000, but for the year 1836, owing, it is supposed, to the discouragement which the traffic has sustained from the iman of Muscat, no more than 1000 slaves were imported. [...] Of the slaves imported, one half is usually sent to the Muntefick town on the Euphrates, named Sook-ess-Shookh, from whence they are pread all over Southern Mesopotamia, and Eastern Syria; a quarter are exported directly to Baghdad and the remainder are disposed of in the Bussorah Market.

Slaves from the Swahili coast of East Africa where still trafficked via the Indian Ocean slave trade to the Persian Gulf in the 1930s. Slavery in Iraq as such where not abolished until 1924.

== See also ==
- Firman of 1854
- Anglo-Egyptian Slave Trade Convention
- Anglo-Ottoman Convention of 1880
- Kanunname of 1889
