= Firman on slavery (1830) =

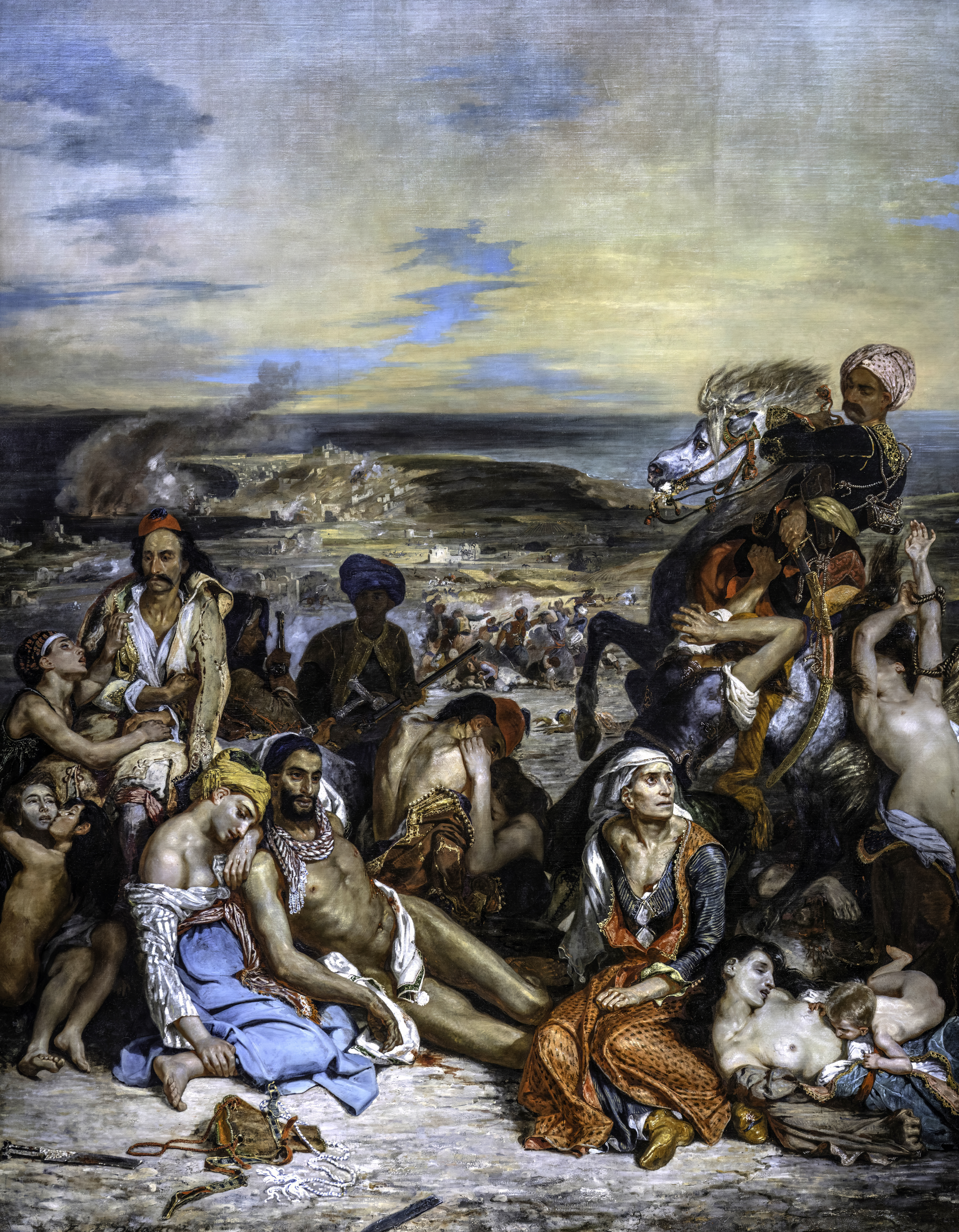
Eugène Delacroix, The Massacre at Chios, 1824.

The Firman of 1830 refers to the Imperial Firman or Ferman (Decree) issued by Sultan Mahmud II in 1830. It declared the official liberation of Christian slaves of the Ottoman Empire. In practice it concerned the liberation of the Greek war captives who had been enslaved during the Greek War of Independence (1821–1829).

It was one of the reforms representing the process of official abolition of slavery in the Ottoman Empire, including the Firman of 1830, the Disestablishment of the Istanbul Slave Market (1847), the Suppression of the slave trade in the Persian Gulf (1847), the Prohibition of the Circassian and Georgian slave trade (1854–1855), the Prohibition of the Black Slave Trade (1857), and the Anglo-Ottoman Convention of 1880.

== Background and the Firman ==
The Firman was issued in a time period when the Ottoman Empire was subjected to a growing diplomatic pressure from the West to suppress slave trade and slavery in the Ottoman Empire. Responding to the influence and pressure of European countries in the 19th century, the Empire began taking steps to curtail the slave trade, which had been legally valid under Ottoman law since the beginning of the empire. One of the important campaigns against Ottoman slavery and slave trade was conducted in the Caucasus by the Russian authorities.

The Ottoman Empire practiced the Islamic Law, which allowed Muslims to enslave non-Muslim (kafir) war captives. During the Greek War of Independence, many Greek men, women and children had been captured and sold as slaves in Ottoman slave markets. One such incident was the Chios massacre of 1822. This had caused great indignation in Europe on behalf of the Christian Greeks.

In 1830, a firman of Sultan Mahmud II declared "white slaves" of the Empire to be manumitted. Technically, the decree applied to people who had been Christian at the time of their capture and enslavement, and in practice, it was enforced for the Greeks who had been enslaved during the recent Greek War of Independence (1821–1829).

== See also ==
- Firman of 1854
- Anglo-Egyptian Slave Trade Convention
- Anglo-Ottoman Convention of 1880
