= Hizmetçi İdaresi =

Hizmetçi İdaresi, was a state organization for servants in the Ottoman Empire, founded in 1908. It worked as an asylum to formerly enslaved women and children, and an employment agency for female domestic servants.

== History ==
In the Ottoman Empire and the Muslim world, there was no tradition with free maidservants. Free Muslim women where expected to live in sex segregation in as high degree as possible. This made it difficult for Muslim women to work as domestic servants in the home of another family. It also made it difficult to employ free male servants. The domestic servants of private homes in the Islamic world where therefore normally house slaves; female slaves or eunuchs, purchased as children. To work as domestic servants was one of the two main tasks for female slaves during the era of slavery in the Muslim world, alongside that of sexual slavery (concubinage in Islam). When a slave was freed, they rarely had no other option than to continue to work for their former owners, with no true difference in their conditions or status.

Slavery in the Ottoman Empire was nominally abolished by the Reform of 1889, and the slave market Avret Pazarları was officially closed by the Disestablishment of the Istanbul Slave Market. From this point on the house slaves where referred to as servants rather than slaves, but where de facto still slaves. The nominal emancipation made it easier for employers to get rid of slaves they no longer wanted, by firing them rather than to sell them. Consequently, a class of free maidservants was created.

By this point in time the new concept of free employed maidservants was first described in Ottoman literature, where they were described with suspicion as potential untrustworthy seductresses and criminals. Former female slaves rarely had other options than to continue to work for their former enslavers. If they were fired, they were often forced to rely on prostitution to survive.

The Young Turks founded the Hizmetçi İdaresi as a Servant Institution to assist former female slaves to find employment as domestic workers and maidservants in order to escape prostitution to survive. In practice, however, the institution is reported to have functioned as a slave market. In Ottoman society, 'free' and 'enslaved' domestic workers often worked under similar terms and conditions. While many enslaved workers were captives in war or purchased at slave markets, others were freeborn people entered into a contractual relationship of servitude with specified terms (including payment) and often for a specified period of time. Freeborn young women of the lower classes would frequently enter into such an arrangement until they either found a husband or reached a specified age. Though these women (called emanetçi) were legally bound in servitude, they could not generally be sold off like slaves whom their masters held in right; and, unlike other female slaves, they were generally exempt from sexual slavery (as the expectation was that their service would expire/they would be manumitted upon marriage). Whether purchased, captured, or freeborn-contractual, slaves of the Ottoman Empire had nominal legal rights in accordance with their religious identity, although in practice the enforcement of these rights varied widely.

== See also ==
- Women in the Ottoman Empire
