= Prohibition of the Circassian and Georgian Slave Trade =

1854 Ottoman imperial decree

The Firman of 1854, sometimes called the Prohibition of the Circassian and Georgian Slave Trade, refers to the Imperial Firman or Ferman (Decree) issued by Sultan Abdülmecid I in October 1854, prohibiting the slave trade in Circassian and Georgian slaves to the Ottoman Empire. It was specifically directed toward the Circassian slave trade in slave girls from the Caucasus, for sexual slavery as concubines in Ottoman harems. It did not ban slavery as such, only the trade in slaves. The decree was only enforced for four years, and retracted in 1858.

It was one of the reforms representing the process of official abolition of slavery in the Ottoman Empire, including the Firman of 1830, the Disestablishment of the Istanbul Slave Market (1847), the Suppression of the slave trade in the Persian Gulf (1847), the Prohibition of the Circassian and Georgian Slave Trade (1854–1855), the Prohibition of the Black Slave Trade (1857), and the Anglo-Ottoman Convention of 1880.

== Background ==
The Firman was issued in a period when the Ottoman Empire was subjected to growing diplomatic pressure from the West to suppress slave trade and slavery in the Ottoman Empire. The Firman of 1830 had officially liberated all white slaves in the Empire. It was followed by the closure of the open slave market in Constantinople by the Disestablishment of the Istanbul Slave Market in 1847. After this date, slaves were sold behind the scenes rather than in the open, and no longer visible to foreigners.

In this time period, the trafficking in girls from the Caucasus across the Black Sea to the Ottoman Empire attracted attention in the West. Young girls were sold to slave traders and trafficked to Constantinople, where they were sold into sexual slavery as concubines in the private harems of wealthy men. One of these harems were the Imperial harem.

The so-called Circassian slave trade was a successor of the old Crimean slave trade and was viewed as a luxury trade in the Ottoman Empire, where many aristocratic men had bought concubines or future daughters-in-law from this trade. In the West, this trade caused a growing opposition. After 1846, the open slave market in Constantinople was closed. After this the Circassian slave girls were sold discreetly from the private houses of the slave traders, instead of in public. During the Crimean war, the pressure on the Ottoman empire from both Britain and France was intense.

== Firman ==
In 1854, the Ottoman Empire banned the trade in white women after pressure from Great Britain and France. The Firman banned the slave trade in white slaves from Caucasus and Georgia. The governors of the provinces were ordered to prevent the sale of Caucasus children and to confiscate and liberate Caucasian children in possession of the slave traders. The Caucasian slave boys were to be escorted back to their families by some appointed trustworthy person, unless they had converted to Islam, in which case they were to be enlisted in military service; as for the girls, those who had converted to Islam were to have marriages arranged for them.

The pressure from Western powers continued. In 1855, the trade in African slaves to Crete and Janina was banned. In the firman of 1857, the Ottoman Empire formally banned the African slave trade. Abolitionist policy was also consistent with the modernization reform efforts of the Tanzimat era.

The Firman of 1854 was one of the causes of the Hejaz rebellion of 1855-1856. Abdulmuttalib Efendi, emir of Mecca, gathered support by asking the notables of Jeddah to write a letter of 1 April 1855 to the sharif and ulema of Mecca, where they condemned the Firman as concession to Europeans, since it authorized the Ottoman governors to ban slave trade, permitted non-Muslims to erect edifices in the Arab Peninsula, allow non-Muslim men to marry Muslim women and prohibited the interference in women's dress, and the notables of Jeddah petitioned the emir to petition the Sultan. On 11 January 1856 Seyhülislam Arif Efendi ruled that the firman did not violate sharia to the dignitaries of Mecca, and that while it did prohibit the trade in slaves, it did not prohibit slavery itself, and did not threaten the slaveowners' possession of their human property. When the firman of 1857 was introduced the following year, banning the African slave trade, the Hejaz was excluded from the prohibition.

== Aftermath ==
The Firman was only enforced for four years. The enforcement caused a great price inflation of white slave girls on the Ottoman slave market. In March 1858, the Ottoman governor of Trapezunt informed the British Consul that the 1854 ban had been a temporary war time ban due to foreign pressure, and that he had been given orders to allow slave ships on the Black Sea to pass on their way to Constantinople. In December 1858, formal tax regulations were introduced, legitimizing the Circassian slave trade again.

Western diplomats protested repeatedly against the fact that the Circassian slave trade had been resumed despite the Firman of 1854 but was routinely met with the reply that the Firman of 1854 had merely been a temporary war-time measure, and no longer applied. The sex slave trade in white girls for sexual slavery (concubinage) did not stop, and the British travel writer John Murray described a batch of white slave girls in the Middle East in the 1870s:

"Their complexion are sallow, and none of them [sic] are even good looking. But the daily Turkish bath, protection from the sun, and a wholesome diet, working upon and excellent constitution, accomplish wonders in a short space of time".

The Circassian slave trade, while practiced gradually more discreetly, continued until the end of the Ottoman Empire in the early twentieth century.

== See also ==
- Anglo-Egyptian Slave Trade Convention
- Anglo-Ottoman Convention of 1880
- Kanunname of 1889
