= Prohibition of the Black Slave Trade =

Ottoman law abolishing the slave trade

The Firman of 1857, also referred to as the Prohibition of the Black Slave Trade, refers to the Imperial Firman or Ferman (Decree) issued by Sultan Abdülmecid I in 1857.

The decree formally prohibited the import of African slaves to the Ottoman Empire. However, the decree was introduced because of diplomatic pressure, was not enforced and remained nominal on paper only. It also excluded the Hejaz Province, which was the main destination of the Red Sea slave trade.

== Background and firman ==
It was one of the reforms representing the process of official abolition of slavery in the Ottoman Empire, including the Firman of 1830, Disestablishment of the Istanbul Slave Market (1847), Suppression of the slave trade in the Persian Gulf (1847), the Prohibition of the Circassian and Georgian slave trade (1854–1855), Prohibition of the Black Slave Trade (1857), and the Anglo-Ottoman Convention of 1880.

The Firman was issued in a time period when the Ottoman Empire was subjected to a growing diplomatic pressure from the West to suppress slave trade and slavery in the Ottoman Empire. Abolitionist policy was also consistent with the modernization reform efforts of the Tanzimat era. The Firman of 1854 had banned the slave trade from the Caucasus. In 1855, the trade in African slaves to Crete and Janina was banned. This was a ban against one route of the African slave trade to the Ottoman Empire.

In 1857, British pressure resulted in the Ottoman Sultan issuing a firman (decree) that prohibited the slave trade from the Sudan to Ottoman Egypt and across the Red Sea to Ottoman Hijaz. The firman did not prohibit slavery as such, nor did it prohibit slave trade as such: it merely prohibited the import of African slaves from lands outside of the empire across the borders to the Ottoman Empire.

== Aftermath ==
However the previous prohibition of white slave trade had already caused the Hejaz rebellion in the Hijaz Province, which resulted in the slave trade in the Hijaz being exempted from the prohibition of the Red Sea slave trade and the prohibition remained nominal on paper only. Ultimately, the Firman of 1857 was never enforced in practice. The Red Sea slave trade across the Red Sea to the Ottoman Arabia continued, as did the Trans-Saharan slave trade via Ottoman Libya, as well as the slave trade to Ottoman Egypt via Sudan.

The non-enforcement of the Firman of 1857 resulted in a continuing British pressure. It was succeeded by the Anglo-Egyptian Slave Trade Convention in 1877.

== See also ==
- Firman of 1854
- Anglo-Egyptian Slave Trade Convention
- Anglo-Ottoman Convention of 1880
- Kanunname of 1889
