= Anglo-Egyptian Slave Trade Convention =

Treaty between the United Kingdom and the Khedivate of Egypt

The Anglo-Egyptian Slave Trade Convention, also known as Anglo-Egyptian Convention for the Suppression of the Slave Trade or Anglo-Egyptian Convention for the Abolition of Slavery, was a treaty between the United Kingdom of Great Britain and Ireland and the Khedivate of Egypt from 1877. The first version of 1877 was followed by an addition in 1884 and a second addition in 1895. It formally banned the slave trade to Egypt. While slavery itself was not abolished, existing slaves were granted the right to apply for manumission, which managed to phase out slavery by the early 20th-century.

== Background ==
The British had an ongoing policy of pressure against the Ottoman Empire to prohibit the slave trade. The Anglo-Egyptian Slave Trade Convention was preceded by the Firman of 1857, which prohibited the trade in African slaves in to the Ottoman Empire, which Ottoman Egypt formally belonged to. However the Firman of 1857 was nominal on paper only, and the British pressure therefore continued in the issue.

== Convention ==
The treaty of 1877 officially banned the slave trade from Sudan, thus formally putting an end on the import of slaves from Sudan. Sudan was at this time the main import of male slaves to Egypt. This ban was followed in 1884 by a ban on the import of white women; this law was directed against the import of white women (mainly from Caucasus and usually Circassians via the Circassian slave trade), which were the preferred choice for harem concubines among the Egyptian upper class.

The addition of 1895 prohibited any interference of the "full liberty of action of an enfranchised slave", thereby assuring them the right to marry and inherit, which had often been deprived them by their former owners; slave trading was now to be addressed by the domestic criminal courts instead of the courts-martials, which made it more efficient, increased penalties and authorized vigilance preventing the slave traffic from the Red Sea slave trade in to Egypt.

== Aftermath ==
The import of male slaves from Sudan as soldiers, civil service and eunuchs, as well as the import of female slaves from Caucasus as harem women were the two main sources of slave import to Egypt, thus these laws were, at least on paper, major blows on Slavery in Egypt. Slavery itself was not banned, only the import of slaves. However a ban on the sale on existing slaves was introduced alongside a law giving existing slaves the legal right to apply for manumission at the British Consulate or at four Bureaus of Manumission established in different parts of the country, and thousands of slaves used the opportunity to apply a certificate of liberation.

British abolitionists in Egypt opened a home for former female slaves to assist them and protect them from falling victim to prostitution, which was in operation from 1884 until 1908. In 1901 a French observer shared his impression that slavery in Egypt was over "in fact and in law"; the Egyptian census of 1907 no longer listed any slaves, and in 1911 Repression of Slave Trade Departments were closed and transformed to Sudan. While it was acknowledged that slavery itself was not banned and still existed by 1908, it was by then no longer visible enough to be a focus of Western criticism.

== See also ==
- History of Anglo-Egyptian Sudan
- Firman of 1854
- Anglo-Ottoman Convention of 1880
- Kanunname of 1889
- Frere Treaty
