= Kanunname of 1889 =

1889 law

The Kanunname of 1889 was a kanunname (Code of law) issued by Sultan Abdul Hamid II on 30 December 1889. It prohibited the importation and sale of African slaves from foreign lands to the Ottoman Empire. It was introduced due to British diplomatic pressure in anticipation of the Brussels Anti-Slavery Conference 1889–90 and enforced in 1892. The law included the previous anti-slavery decrees in to one code of law. It was the first anti-slavery law that was actually enforced in the Ottoman Empire, and resulted in a reduction of the slave trade.

== Background ==
The British had a long-standing campaign issuing pressure on the Ottoman Empire to restrict the slave trade and slavery in the Ottoman Empire. The Firman of 1854 and the Firman of 1857 had nominally banned the Circassian slave trade and the African slave trade respectively; the Anglo-Egyptian Slave Trade Convention had banned the import of African slaves via Ottoman Egypt; and the Anglo-Ottoman Convention of 1880 had given the British the right to search every suspected slave ship in Ottoman waters.

However, the Ottoman anti-slave trade decrees were largely nominal, introduced for the benefit of international diplomacy due to Western pressure, and the provincial Ottoman authorities normally did not enforce the legislation. Due to the nominal nature of the previous non-enforced anti-slavery legislation, the British anti-slavery campaign of diplomatic pressure continued. In 1882, the British introduced a memorandum of a proposed anti slavery legislation for the Porte, and in 1883, they put forward a second draft law. The campaign was however long unsuccessful.

== The law code of 1889 ==
In anticipation of the Brussels Anti-Slavery Conference 1889–90, which was due to take place in November 1889, the British diplomatic campaign on the Porte finally had a breakthrough. The British Foreign Office pointed out to the Porte that the Ottoman Empire was due to be met with criticism for their bad enforcement of the Anglo-Ottoman Convention of 1880 at the upcoming Brussels Anti-Slavery Conference unless they took action before then, but that serious anti-slavery action would win the Ottoman Empire the European opinion.

The British diplomatic pressure finally gave results when Sultan Abdul Hamid II introduced the Kanunname of 1889 on 30 December 1889.

The law code was composed of ten articles that largely summarized all the earlier decrees against slavery and slave trade in one law code. In contrast to the previous legislation, the Kanunname of 1889 was not a decree but a law code. It also importantly introduced a legal procedure to search and investigate the crime, as well as an actual punishment, with a fine of five Ottoman lira for slave trade.

The law code did meet most of the demands put forward by the British and was largely a copy of the 1883 draft law. It banned all import of African slaves from foreign lands across the borders to the Ottoman Empire; however it did not introduce any punishment for the sale of slaves within the borders of the Empire, which did attract some British criticism for being weak. Furthermore, the law addressed the slave trade from Africa, not the trade in non-African slaves, and thus did not prohibit the Circassian slave trade of non-African slaves.

== Aftermath ==
The Kanunname of 1889 was introduced in order for the Ottoman Empire to be able to attend the Brussels Anti-Slavery Conference without being subjected to criticism for their bad enforcement of the previous Anglo-Ottoman Convention of 1880, and this goal was achieved. The Ottoman Empire was one of the signature states of the Brussels Conference Act of 1890. This act obliged the Ottoman Empire to free all slaves that had been illegally imported to the Empire, and to allow all foreign embassies to retrieve their citizens who had been enslaved in the Empire from 1889 onward, and this act was enforced in 1892.

The Kanunname of 1889 was the first Ottoman law against slavery to be enforced by the Ottoman authorities. While slavery as such continued to be tolerated, the African slave trade was reduced from the 1890s onward. The slave trade did, however, continue in a smaller scale until the end of the Ottoman Empire in the 20th century, where slaves where still openly sold in public as late as 1908.

== See also ==
- Anglo-Egyptian Slave Trade Convention
- Anglo-Ottoman Convention of 1880
- Hizmetçi İdaresi
