= Red Sea slave trade =

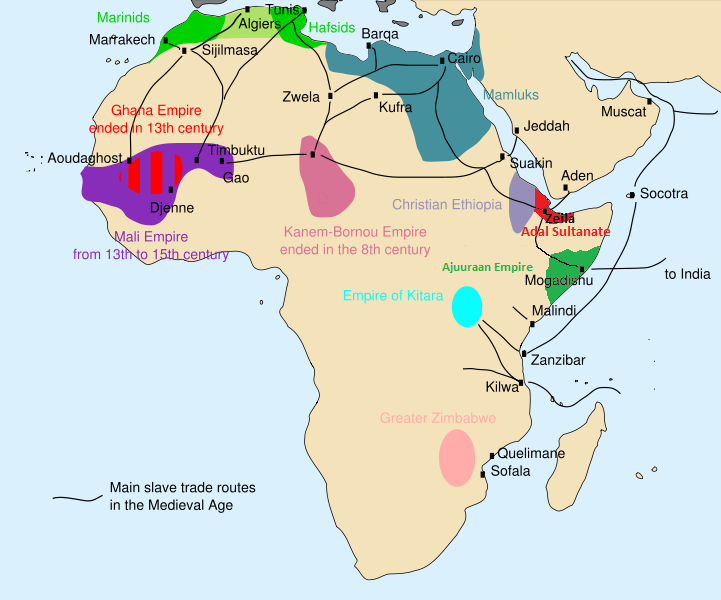
African slave trade

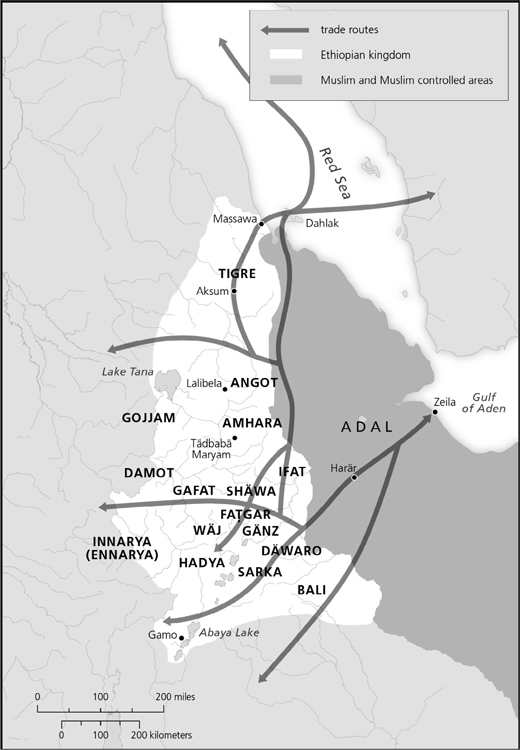
Slave trade routes of the Ethiopian Empire

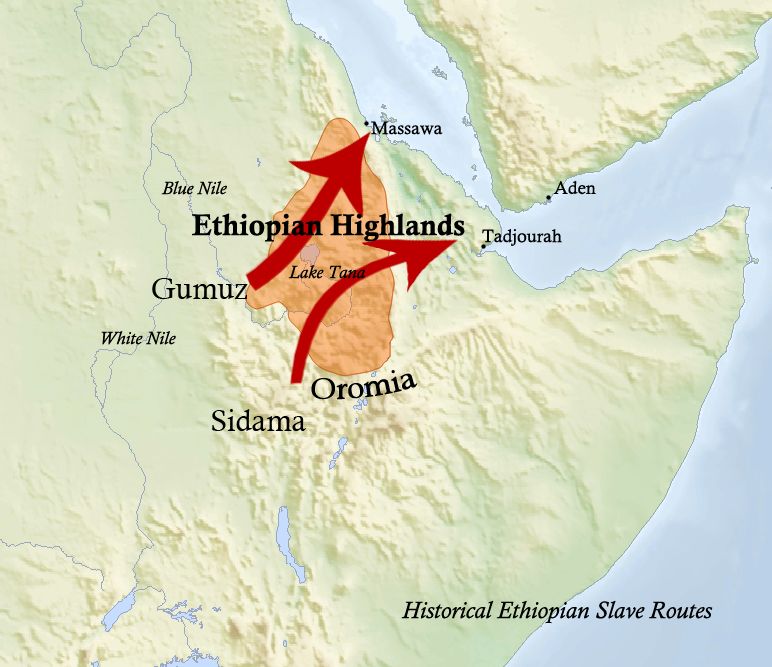
Slave trade routes through Ethiopia

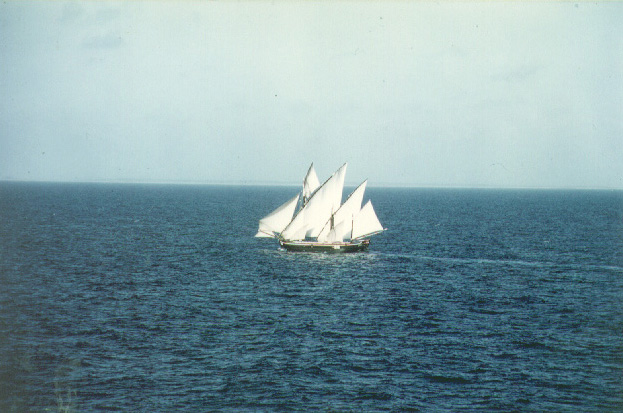
Dhows were used to transport goods and slaves.

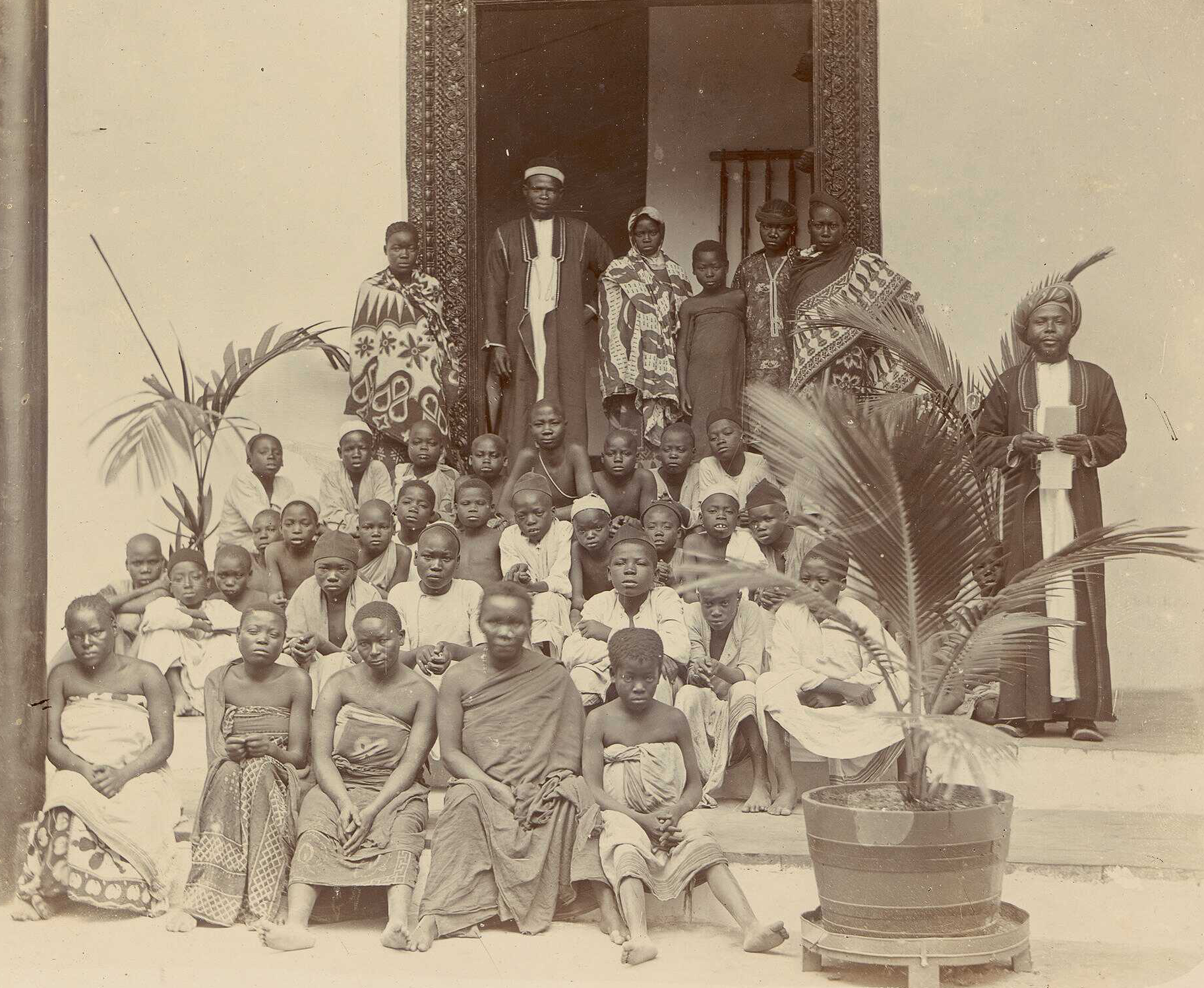
Slaves captured from a dhow.

The Red Sea slave trade, sometimes known as the Islamic slave trade, Arab slave trade, or Oriental slave trade, was a slave trade across the Red Sea trafficking Africans from Sub-Saharan Africa in the African continent to slavery in the Arabian Peninsula and the Middle East from antiquity until the mid-20th century.

The Red Sea slave trade is known as one of the longest enduring slave trades in the world, as it is known to have existed from Ancient times until the 1960s, when slavery in Saudi Arabia and Yemen were abolished. When other slave trade routes were stopped, the Red Sea slave trade became internationally known as a slave trade center during the interwar period. After World War II, growing international pressure eventually resulted in its final official stop in the mid 20th-century.

The Red Sea, the Sahara, and the Indian Ocean were the three main routes by which East African slaves were transported to the Muslim world.

== Overview history ==
The slave trade from Africa to Arabia via the Red Sea had ancient roots. While in Pre-Islamic Arabia, Arab war captives were common targets of slavery, importation of slaves from Ethiopia across the Red Sea also took place. The Red Sea slave trade appears to have been established at least from the 1st-century onward, when enslaved Africans were trafficked across the Red Sea to Arabia and Yemen.

In the 9th century, slaves were transported from the Red Sea slave trade to Jeddah, Mecca, and Medina, and by caravan over the desert to Baghdad and slavery in the Abbasid Caliphate. The slave trade was still going on a many centuries later, when it was noted by Western travelers.

Richard Francis Burton described the slave market in Medina in the 1850s:

"The bazar at Al-Madinah is poor and as almost all the slaves are brought from Meccah by the Jallabs or drivers after exporting the best to Egypt the town receives only the refuse.... some of these slaves come from Abyssinia: the greater part are driven from the Galla country and exported at the harbours of the Somali coast, Berberah, Tajoura and Zayla. As many as 2000 slaves from the former place, and 4000 from the later, are annually shipped off to Mocha, Jeddah, Suez and Maskat. [...] It is a large street roofed with matting and full of coffee-houses. The merchandise sat in rows parallel with the walls. The prettiest girls occupied the highest benches. Below were the plainer sort and lowest of all the boys. They were all gaily dressed in pink and other light-colored muslins with transparent veiles over their heads; and whether from the effect of such unusual splendor or from the re-action succeeding to their terrible land-journey and sea-voyage, they appeared perfectly happy."

According to a British report, 320 slaves were shipped via the Red Sea slave trade to Jeddah in May 1879.

Slaves were marched in shackles from the West Lakes to the coasts of Sudan, Ethiopia and Somalia, placed upon dhows and trafficked across the Indian Ocean to the Gulf or Aden, or across the Red Sea to Arabia and Aden, with weak slaves being thrown in the sea.

After World War I, the East coast of the Red Sea formed an independent nation as the Kingdom of Hejaz (1916–1925). Hejaz did not consider itself obliged to obey the laws and treaties signed by the Ottoman Empire in regard to slavery and slave trade. During the Interwar period, the Kingdom of Hejaz was internationally known as a regional slave trade center.

== Supply sources and routes ==
The sources that supplied the slave trade across the Red Sea was mainly situated in Africa. They included routes directly across the Red Sea from mainland Africa, as well as a route connected to the Indian Ocean slave trade, in which the slaves were originally trafficked via the Indian Ocean slave trade and then in to the Red Sea past Yemen. The origin of the slaves were mainly African, but there were a minority of other ethnicities provided via the Indian Ocean slave trade, mainly Asians.

=== East Africa ===
East Africa came to act as a supply source for slaves to the Arabian Peninsula via the Indian Ocean slave trade since at least the Middle Ages. While the majority of these slaves appear to have been shipped to the Arabian Peninsula via Oman and Muscat rather than via the Red Sea, the Red Sea was also a route for the slave trade between East Africa and the Arabian Peninsula. It also acted as a route for slaves to Egypt.

In the 12th century, Muhammad al-Idrisi trafficked African children from present day Kenya to Arabia.

The slave trade had two major routes to Hejaz. African slaves were trafficked from primarily South Sudan and Ethiopia. Primarily children and young women were bought or given as tribute by their parents to Ethiopian chiefs, who sold them to slave traders. The parents were told that their children were going to be given a better life as slaves in Arabia. The slaves were delivered to Arabian slave traders by the coast and shipped across the Red Sea to Jeddah.

Eunuchs, female concubines and male laborers were the occupations of slaves sent from Ethiopia to Jidda and other parts of Hejaz. The southwest and southern parts of Ethiopia supplied most of the girls being exported by Ethiopian slave traders to India and Arabia. Female and male slaves from Ethiopia made up the main supply of slaves to India and the Middle East.

Egypt and Hejaz were also the recipients of Indian women trafficked via Aden and Goa.

Since Britain banned the slave trade in its colonies, 19th century British ruled Aden was no longer a recipient of slaves and the slaves sent from Ethiopia to Arabia were shipped to Hejaz instead.

=== India ===
India was supply source of slaves to the Arabian Peninsula since Ancient times, although it was to a lesser extent than slaves from Africa.

During the 13th century, Indian boys, women and girls intended for sexual slavery, were trafficked from India to Arabia and to Egypt across the Red Sea via Aden.

=== Madagascar and the Indian Ocean islands ===
Slaves were also trafficked to Red Sea ports from Madagascar and adjacent Indian Ocean islands, such as the Comorian Archipelago, after Arab Muslim traders, along with their Swahili allies, gained control of Zanzibar and the Swahili Coast in the 9th century. From the 9th to the 17th centuries, an estimated 2,000-3,000 East African and Malagasy slaves were trafficked annually from the Indian Ocean coast to slave ports along the Red Sea and other parts of Arabia. By the mid-17th century, this number had surged to over 3,000 to 6,000 slaves trafficked each year from just Madagascar (not including the Comoros Islands) to the Red Sea by non-European Muslim slave traders (Swahili, Comorian, Arab and Hadrami).

Some historians estimate that during the 17th century as many as 150,000 Malagasy slaves were exported from Boeny in northwest Madagascar to the Muslim world including the Red Sea Coast (Jeddah), Hejaz (Mecca), Arabia (Aden), Oman (Muscat), Zanzibar, Kilwa, Lamu, Somalia (Barawa), and possibly Sudan (Suakin), Persia (Bandar Abbas), and India (Surat). Given the racial diversity of Madagascar, which was populated by a mix of Austronesian and Bantu settlers, the Malagasy slaves included people with Southeast Asian, African and hybrid phenotypes.

European traders also took part in the lucrative slave trade between Madagascar and the Red Sea. In 1694, a Dutch East India Company (VOC) ship transported at least 400 Malagasy slaves to an Arabian port on the Red Sea (presumably Jeddah) where they were sold to Arab Muslim traders to be enslaved in Mecca, Medina, Mocha, Aden, al-Shihr, and Kishn. To varying degrees, Portuguese, French, Dutch, English and Ottoman merchants were known to have participated in the Malagasy slave trade as well.

=== Pilgrimage route ===
A major slave route were connected to the Hajj pilgrimage. Already in the Middle Ages, the Hajj played a role in the slave trade. In 1416, al-Maqrizi told how pilgrims coming from Takrur (near the Senegal River) brought 1,700 slaves with them to Mecca.

The annual pilgrimage to Mecca, the Hajj, was biggest vehicle for enslavement. When the open Trans-Saharan slave trade died out, Muslim-African Hajj pilgrims across the Sahara were duped or given low-cost travel expenses by tribal leaders; when they arrived at the East Coast, they were trafficked over the Red Sea in the dhows of the Red Sea slave trade or on small passenger planes, and discovered upon arrival in Saudi Arabia that they were to be sold on the slave market rather than to perform the Hajj.

Slave traders trafficked primarily women and children in the guise of wives, servants and pilgrims to Hejaz, where they were sold after arrival. The victims of this trafficking route were sometimes tricked, and taken on Hajj under false pretenses. Slave traders trafficked women to Hejaz by marrying them and then taking them on the Hajj, where they were sold: afterwards, their families were told that their women had died during the journey.

In a similar fashion, parents entrusted their children to slave traders under the impression that the slave traders were taking their children on Hajj, as servants, or as students. This category of traffic victims came from all over the Muslim world, as far away as the East Indies and China. Some travelers sold their servants or poor travel companions in the Hajj, in order to pay for their travel costs.

The English traveler Charles M. Doughty, who visited Central Arabia in the 1880s, noted that African slaves were brought up to Arabia every year during the hajj, and that "there are bondsmen and bondwomen and free negro families in every tribe and town".

In the 1920s, action was taken against the Red Sea slave trade by the British during their campaign against slavery in Sudan by taking better control of the Hajj pilgrimage, establishing a clearinghouse in Port Sudan for slaves repatriated by the British from slavery in the Kingdom of Hejaz, resulting in over 800 slaves resettled between 1925 and 1935.

In the 1950s, in connection to the Ad Hoc Committee on Slavery and the Supplementary Convention on the Abolition of Slavery, Barnett Janner commented:

The shipping of slaves occurs in only one particular area of the world, in the seas around Arabia. The warships most likely to search such slavers would be British, and I feel sure that there would not be any abuse of the right to search. I am sorry that we gave up the fight for that right. As far as I know, Saudi Arabia and Yemen are the only States in the world where chattel slavery is still a legal institution. Only a year or so ago a French Deputy—the person, I assume, to whom my hon. Friend referred—investigated the situation and found that every year ignorant Africans are lured on by agents to make a pilgrimage to Mecca. They are not told, of course, that they need a Saudi Arabian visa. When they arrive in Saudi Arabia without a visa they are arrested and put into prison for a few days and then handed over to licensed slave dealers. In addition, raids are made in Baluchistan and the Sheikdoms of the Persian Gulf and people are captured and carried off by land and sea, taken to small Saudi Arabian ports and sold in slave markets.

== Activism against the slave trade ==
=== Before World War II ===
Ottoman anti slavery laws where not enforced in the late 19th-century, particularly not in Hejaz; the first attempt to ban the Red Sea slave trade in 1857, the Firman of 1857, resulted in Hejaz being exempted from the ban after the Hejaz rebellion. The Anglo-Ottoman Convention of 1880 formally banned the Red Sea slave trade, but it was not enforced in the Ottoman Provinces in the Arabian Peninsula.

The British fought the slave trade by patrolling the Red Sea. In 1880, the Ottoman Empire conceded to Britain the right to search and seize any vessel to Ottoman territories suspected of carrying slaves. However, these controls were not effective, since the slave traders would inform the European Colonial authorities that the slaves were their wives, children, servants or fellow Hajj pilgrims, and the victims themselves were convinced of the same, unaware that they were being shipped as slaves.

Since the British consulate had opened in Jeddah in the 1870s, the British had used their diplomatic privileges to manumit the slaves escaping to the British Consulate to ask for asylum. Royal slaves were exempted from this right. The French, Italian, and Dutch consulates also used their right to manumit the slaves who reached their consulate to ask for asylum. However, the activity of France and Italy was very limited, and only the Dutch were as willing to use this right as much as Britain. The right for manumission by seeking asylum could be used by any slave who managed to reach the consul office or a ship belonging to a foreign power. Most slaves who used this right were citizens of these nations' colonies, who had traveled to Arabia without being aware that they would be sold as slaves upon arrival. The manumission activity of the foreign consuls was met with formal cooperation by the Arabian authorities but greatly disliked by the local population, and it was common for slaves seeking asylum to disappear between seeking asylum and the moment the consul could arrange a place for them on a boat.

The slavery and slave trade in the Arabian Peninsula, and particular in Saudi Arabia (Kingdom of Hejaz), attracted attention by the League of Nations and contributed to the creation of the 1926 Slavery Convention, obliging the British to combat the slave trade in the area.

In order to combat the Red Sea slave trade, which was strongly connected to the Hajj pilgrimage, the Inter-Sanitary Conference in Alexandria of 1927 declared that pilgrims were to travel only by steamers or motorboats in order to avoid the dhow slave boats, but this regulation proved to be difficult to enforce in practice, and pilgrims continued to cross the Red Sea by dhow to land at places difficult to control.

In 1930 Le Matin published an article about the Red Sea slave trade from French Djibouti, describing how Arab slave traders dumped slaves alive in the Red Sea to avoid the anti slavery patrol ships, aware that they would stop to pick up the slaves rather than keep pursuing the slave ships (dhows); the article attracted a lot of attention and contributed to French support for the foundation of the Committee of Experts on Slavery.

In 1933 Nigeria introduced a new passport system that required Hajj pilgrims to deposit funds to cover the expenses and return fares in order to prevent their enslavement during the Hajj.

Between 1928 and 1931, the British consulate in Jeddah helped 81 people to be manumitted, 46 of whom were repatriated to Sudan and 25 to Massawa in Eritrea. The vast majority of slaves originated from Africa, but the fact that the majority of them had been trafficked as children posed a problem for the authorities. They could not remember exactly where they had come from or where their family lived, could no longer speak any language other than Arabic, and thus had difficulty supporting themselves after repatriation, all of which in the 1930s had caused a reluctance from the authorities to receive them.

In 1936, Saudi Arabia formally banned the import of slaves who were not already slaves prior to entering the kingdom, a reform which was however on paper only.

=== After World War II ===
After World War II, there was growing international pressure from the United Nations to end the slave trade. In 1948, the United Nations declared slavery to be a crime against humanity in the Universal Declaration of Human Rights, after which the Anti-Slavery Society pointed out that there was about one million slaves in the Arabian Peninsula, which was a crime against the 1926 Slavery Convention, and demanded that the UN form a committee to handle the issue.

The British Anti-Slavery Society actively campaigned against the slavery and slave trade in the Arabian Peninsula from the conclusion of World War II until the 1970s, and particularly publicized Saudi Arabia's central role in 20th-century chattel Slavery within the United Nations, but their efforts was long opposed by the lack of support from London and Washington. The British Foreign office's internal reports noted an upswing in the slave trade to Saudi Arabia after WII, but preferred to turn a blind eye to it to avoid international exposure of their own Gulf Sheikh allies’ complicity in the slave trade.

The US Eisenhower administration sought to undermine the Bricker Amendment by a retreat from the UN, and made Saudi Arabia a cornerstone of the Eisenhower Doctrine, and therefore abstained from the United Nations Supplementary Convention on the Abolition of Slavery, the Slave Trade, and Institutions and Practices Similar to Slavery. The British Anti-Slavery Society failed to pass stricter enforcement at the 1956 UN Supplementary Convention on Slavery, but the issue started to attract international attention.

== Abolition ==
When President John F. Kennedy took office, the issue of slavery within the US ally Saudi Arabia had caused growing domestic and international attention and caused damage to the Kennedy administration's liberal world-order rhetoric and the US-Saudi partnership, and Kennedy pressed Saudi leaders to "modernize and reform" if they wished US military assistance during the Yemeni Civil War. Kennedy wished to strengthen the UN, which in turn also strengthened the long going abolition campaign of the British Anti Slavery Society within the UN and gave it gravitas. The Kennedy administration also experienced international pressure from influential secular Middle East regional leaders like Gamal Abdel Nasser, as well as from the newly decolonized African states, whose own citizens were the most common victims of the slave trade to the Arabian Peninsula, and whose good will was necessary Kennedy's anti Soviet New Frontier agenda in the Global South. The Kennedy administration therefore put pressure on Saudi Arabia to introduce "modernization reforms", a request which was heavily directed against slavery.

In 1962, Saudi Arabia abolished slavery officially; however, unofficial slavery is rumored to exist. The same year, 1962, slavery in Yemen was banned as well, followed by Dubai in 1963 and Oman in 1970.

However, the slave trade continued illegally until at least the 1980s. A testimony from 1971 reported that the chattel slave trade to Saudi Arabia still continued secretly, despite the fact that it had been officially banned nine years prior; and 11 years later, in 1982, 20 years after the official abolition, there was another testimony of illegal trafficking of chattel slaves to Saudi Arabia. In 1971, Dr. Oliver Ransom reported that African children were still being trafficked across the Red Sea to the port cities alongside the Arabian coast and sold to the highest bidder as chattel slaves. In 1982, John Laffin reported that poor pilgrims from Africa were still illegally trafficked over the Red Sea and sold as chattel slaves upon their arrival, and stated that the slave trade had in fact become more easy when it no longer had to rely on boats but slaves could be transported by plane. No testimony is published about occurring slave trade after the 1980s, however, when the chattel slave trade appear to have been replaced by the kafala system.

== Legacy ==
Research has indicated links between the Red Sea slave trade and female genital mutilation. An investigation combining contemporary from data on slave shipments from 1400 to 1900 with data from 28 African countries has found that women belonging to ethnic groups historically victimized by the Red Sea slave trade were "significantly" more likely to suffer genital mutilation in the 21st-century, as well as "more in favour of continuing the practice". Women trafficked in the Red Sea slave trade were sold as concubines (sex slaves) in the Islamic Middle East up until as late as in the mid 20th-century, and the practice of infibulation was used to temporarily signal the virginity of girls, increasing their value on the slave market: "According to descriptions by early travelers, infibulated female slaves had a higher price on the market because infibulation was thought to ensure chastity and loyalty to the owner and prevented undesired pregnancies".

== Depictions in media and fiction ==
- The Red Sea Sharks

== Gallery ==
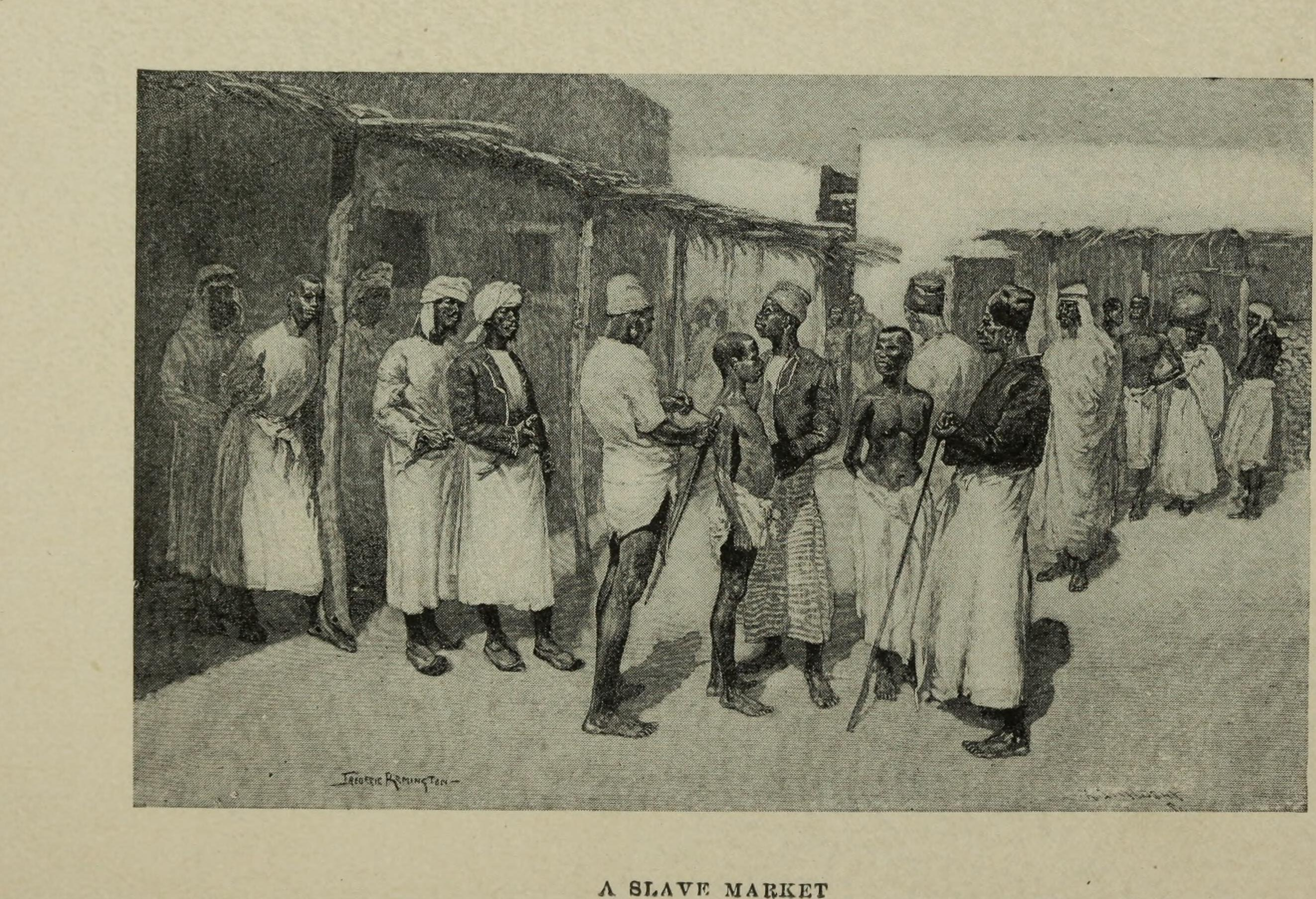
Slave Market, 1893

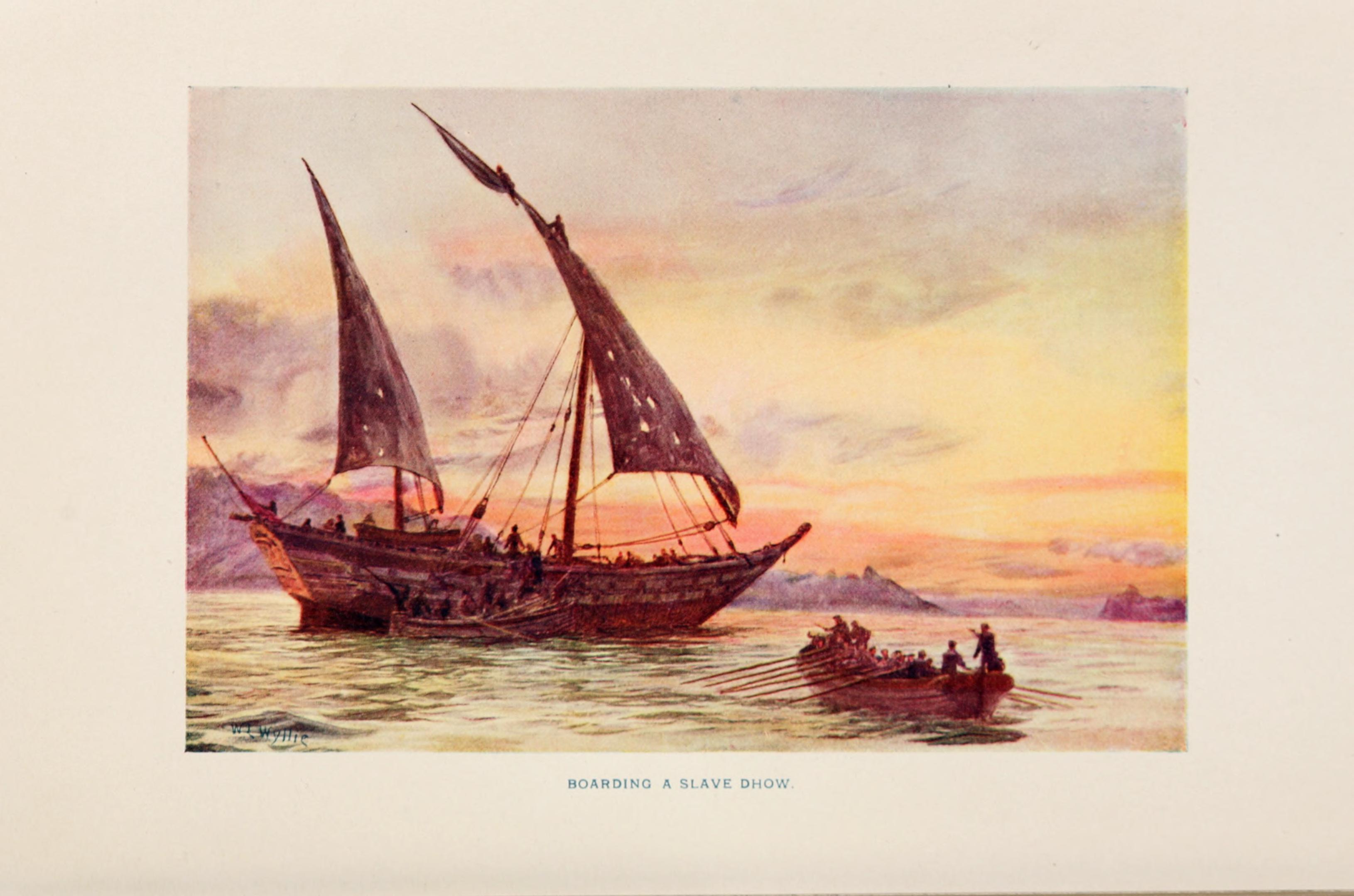
Boarding a Slave Dhow

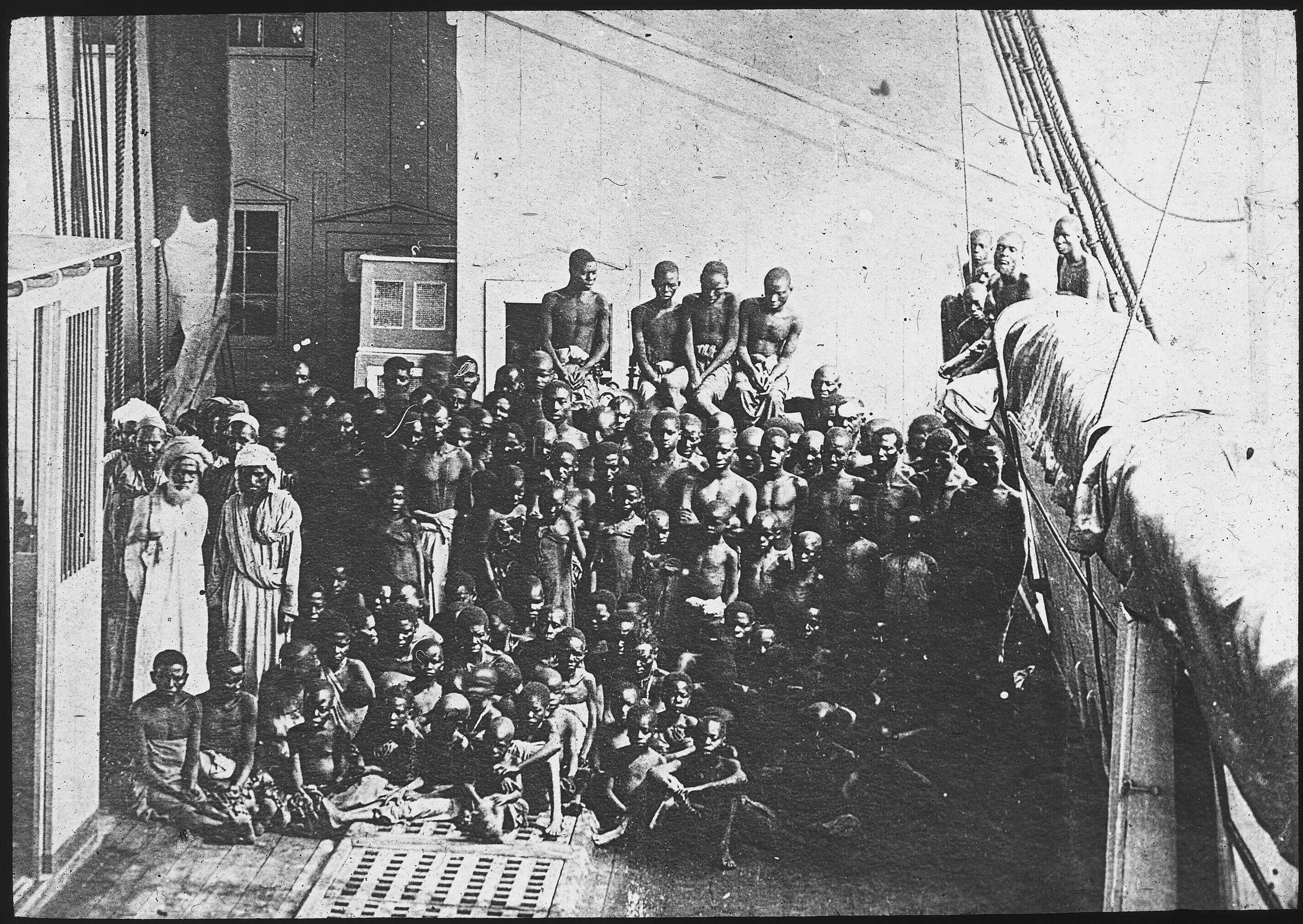
Freed Slaves

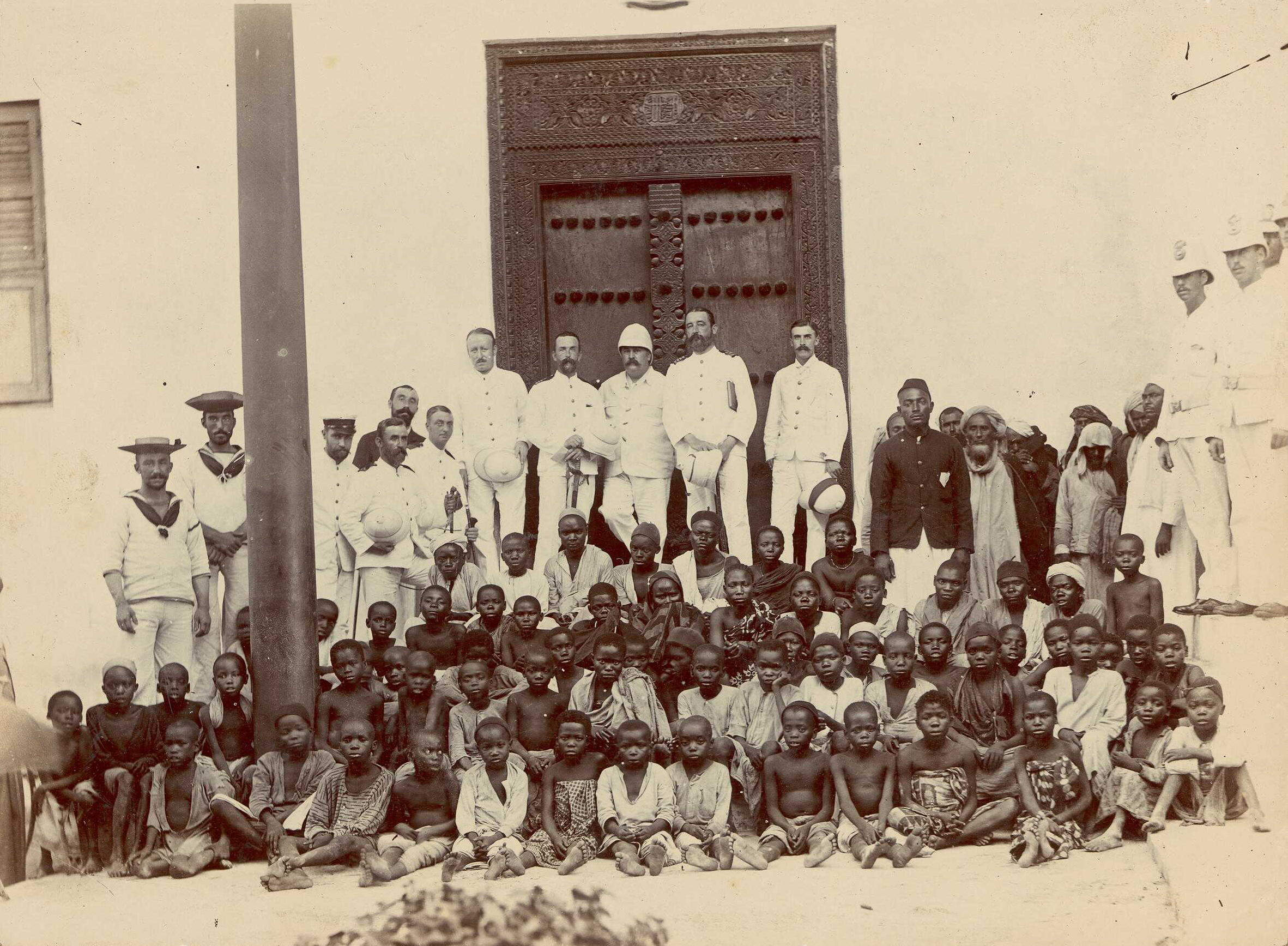
Slaves captured from a dhow

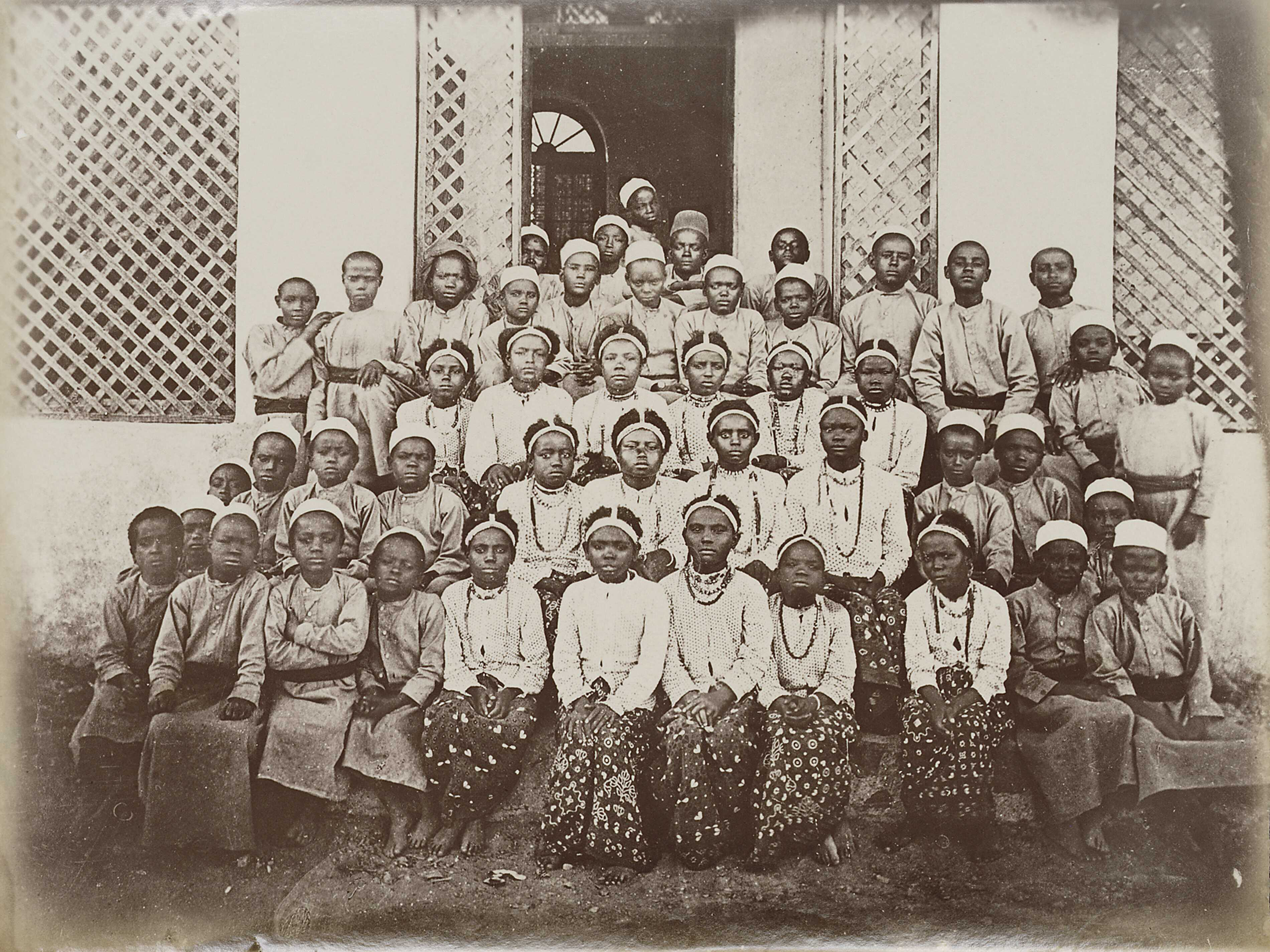
A group of freed children

== See also ==
- Comoros slave trade
- Zanzibar slave trade
- Slavery in Saudi Arabia
- Afro-Saudis
- Treaty of Jeddah (1927)
- History of slavery in the Muslim world
- Human trafficking in Saudi Arabia
- History of concubinage in the Muslim world
- Slavery in Oman
- Slavery in Mauritania
- Human trafficking in the Middle East
- Kafala system
- Baqt
