= Anglo-Ottoman Convention of 1880 =

Treaty

The Anglo-Ottoman Convention of 1880 also known as Anglo-Ottoman Convention for the suppression of the African traffic and Anglo–Ottoman Convention for the Suppression of the Slave Trade, was a treaty between the United Kingdom of Great Britain and Ireland and the Ottoman Empire from 1880. The Convention addressed the slave trade of the Ottoman Empire, specifically the Red Sea slave trade of Africans across the Red Sea toward the Ottoman province of Hejaz.

== Background ==
The British conducted an international anti-slavery campaign. In 1857, British pressure resulted in the Ottoman Sultan issuing a firman (decree), the Firman of 1857, that prohibited the slave trade from the Sudan to Ottoman Egypt and across the Red Sea to Ottoman Hijaz. However the preceding anti-slave trade firman of 1854 had already caused the Hejaz rebellion in the Hijaz Province, and resulted in the slave trade in the Hijaz being exempted from the prohibition of the Red Sea slave trade and the prohibition remained nominal on paper only.

The Anglo-Egyptian Slave Trade Convention of 1877 had addressed the trade of African slaves to the Ottoman Empire, specifically Ottoman Egypt from Sudan. However this convention had not been effective. Many slaves were transported via the Red Sea, and the khedive of Egypt had not authority to search the slave ships outside of the coast of Ottoman Arabia (Hejaz).

== The Convention ==
After British pressure, with support from the Grand Vizier and the Council of Ministers, Sultan Abdul Hamid II finally agreed to address the issue of the slave trade in the Red Sea.

The Anglo-Ottoman Convention of 1880 banned the Red Sea slave trade. The British were given the right to stop and control all ships suspected of trafficking slaves on Ottoman waters

In practice, this prohibition was not enforced in the Hejaz Province. The Ottoman authorities officially opposed slavery for the sake of diplomacy in their foreign policy, but tolerated slavery and slave trade in the provinces of the Empire in their internal policy. Consequently, the anti-slavery laws that were introduced after foreign pressure was not enforced. This made the convention inefficient, Hejaz being a major destination of the Red Sea slave trade.

== Aftermath ==
The introduction of the Anglo-Ottoman Convention of 1880 and its inefficient enforcement caused a continuing British pressure upon the Ottoman Empire regarding the suppression of slavery and slave trade in the Empire. In 1883, a draft was presented in order to complement and compensate for the bad enforcement of the Anglo-Ottoman Convention of 1880. In an Imperial firman (decree) of 1887, chattel slavery was declared formally abolished and no longer legally recognized, the decree stating: "The Imperial government not officially recognizing the state of slavery, considers by law every person living in the empire to be free". This law was however nominal and slave trade continued.

After British pressure, Sultan Abdul Hamid II promulgated a law against the Black slave trade on 30 December 1889, the Kanunname of 1889. However, this law did not include any special punishment against slave trade within the empire, and it was not deemed efficient.

The Ottoman Empire participated in the Brussels Anti-Slavery Conference 1889–90. Due to the 1889 law introduced prior to the Conference, the British confirmed that the Ottomans had lived up to the commitments of the Anglo-Ottoman Convention of 1880. The Ottoman Empire and 16 other countries signed the 1890 Brussels Conference Act for the suppression of the slave trade. The Act obliged the Ottoman Empire to manumit all slaves within its borders who had been illegally trafficked, and granted every signure states the right to liberate or demand the liberation of every one of their citizens who had been brought to the Ottoman Empire as slaves since 1889, and this Act was enforced in 1892.

== See also ==
- Firman of 1854
- Anglo-Egyptian Slave Trade Convention
- Kanunname of 1889
- Frere Treaty
