= African diaspora =

Spread of people with African heritage

- Pan-African flag

- World map of African diaspora

Regions with significant populations
- Brazil: 20,656,458–112,739,744 (2022) (Note: In the 2022 Brazilian census, 20,656,458 Brazilians self-identified as preto (black), while 92,083,286 identified as pardo (brown), a category that designates individuals of mixed racial ancestry. There is debate over whether all pardos have African ancestry. While some pardos may have mixed heritage without African descent, this is considered marginal as the overwhelming majority have some degree of African ancestry.)
- United States: 41,104,200–46,936,733 (2020 census)
- Venezuela: 1,015,600–17,100,000 (2024 CEPAL; 2015 World Bank projection) (Note: CEPAL estimated 1,015,600 Afro-Venezuelans in 2024 using a narrower census-based definition. Harvard University's ReVista estimated approximately 15 million people of African descent around 2010. The World Bank's 2018 report projected 17.1 million Afro-Venezuelans for 2015, equivalent to 55% of the population, including people classified as moreno. These estimates use different classifications and reference years.)
- Haiti: 11,200,000–11,333,000 (2023–2024 estimates)
- Colombia: 4,671,160–10,500,000 (2018 DANE; historical estimate) (Note: The Colombian National Administrative Department of Statistics (DANE) estimated 4,671,160 Black, Afro-Colombian, Raizal and Palenquero people in 2018, corresponding to 9.34% of the population. CEPAL projected 4,864,200 Afro-Colombians in 2024. A higher historical estimate of approximately 10.5 million, or 25% of Colombia's population at the time, was provided by the Colombian Ombudsman's Office (Defensoría del Pueblo) and documented in the February 2010 statement of United Nations Independent Expert Gay McDougall. The 10.5 million figure is a historical alternative estimate rather than an official census count.)
- Dominican Republic: 3,209,595–c. 8,833,000 (2022 census; broader estimate) (Note: The 2022 Dominican census recorded 642,018 Black, 2,237,370 moreno and 330,207 mulato people, totaling 3,209,595 among persons aged 12 and older. CEPAL estimated 3,892,400 Afro-descendants in 2024. Harvard previously estimated approximately 8 million. The Dominican Republic's official ENHOGAR-2021 survey classified 82% of respondents aged 15 and older as Afro-descendant using a broad definition combining negro/afrodescendiente, moreno/mulato and mestizo/indio. Applying this percentage to the 2022 national population of 10,771,504 produces approximately 8,833,000. This upper figure is a calculated extrapolation, not an official census count.)
- Cuba: 4,006,926–c. 7,817,000 (2012 census; broader estimate) (Note: Cuba's 2012 census recorded 1,034,044 Black people and 2,972,882 mixed-race people, totaling 4,006,926, approximately 35.9% of the population. CEPAL estimated 4,007,900 Afro-Cubans in 2024. Minority Rights Group International has published broader estimates approaching 70% of the population. Applying 70% to Cuba's 2012 census population of 11,167,325 gives approximately 7,817,000. This upper figure is an illustrative extrapolation from a historical percentage estimate and is not an official census count.)
- France: 3,000,000–5,000,000
- Saudi Arabia: 3,600,000
- Yemen: 3,500,000
- Mexico: 2,576,213 (2020 census)
- Jamaica: 2,510,000
- United Kingdom: 2,485,724 (2021–2022)
- Iraq: 2,000,000
- Ecuador: 814,495–c. 1,694,000 (2022 census; broader estimate) (Note: Ecuador's 2022 census recorded 814,495 Afro-Ecuadorians, including those identifying as Afro-descendant, Black or Mulatto, representing 4.8% of the population. CEPAL estimated 888,300 in 2024. The World Bank projected approximately 1.2 million for 2015. Minority Rights Group International reports that Afro-Ecuadorian organizations estimate the population at approximately 10%, citing undercounting concerns. Applying this percentage to the 2022 census population of 16,938,986 produces approximately 1,694,000. The upper figure is an extrapolation, not an official census count.)
- Spain: 1,206,701 (African-nationality population) (Note: This figure is based on residents holding the nationalities of African countries, including North African countries, rather than a census of Black Spaniards or all people of sub-Saharan African descent. The original listing describes approximately 79% as North African; that percentage requires independent verification.)
- Italy: 1,140,000 (2019) (Note: The figure represents approximately 1.14 million residents with citizenship of African countries, including North African countries, as of January 2019. It does not measure the entire Black Italian population. The source also presents a broader estimate of approximately 1.7 million people of African origin when naturalized citizens and irregular residents are included.)
- Germany: 1,000,000
- Peru: 828,894 (2017 census)
- Oman: 750,000
- Netherlands: 507,000
- Trinidad and Tobago: 452,536
- Belgium: 358,268 (2023)
- Australia: 326,673 (2021)
- Portugal: 425,156–700,000
- Argentina: 302,936 (2022)
- Sweden: 283,695 (2024)
- Barbados: 270,853
- Pakistan: 250,000
- Puerto Rico: 228,711
- Guyana: 225,860
- Suriname: 200,406
- Chile: 195,809 (2017) (Note: Including Haitian immigrants)
- Uruguay: 149,689 (2011)
- Norway: 144,510 (2025)
- Grenada: 108,700
- Turkey: 100,000
- Finland: 70,592 (2023)
- Jordan: 60,000
- Russia: 50,000 (est. 2009)
- Costa Rica: 45,228 (2018); 289,209 (mixed)
- Guatemala: 27,647 (2018); 19,529 (mixed)
- India: 19,514 (2011)
- Paraguay: 8,013 (2022)

Languages
- English (American, Caribbean), French (Canadian, Haitian), Haitian Creole, Jamaican Patois, Spanish, Portuguese, Papiamento, Dutch, Catalan, Palenquero and African languages

Religion
- Christianity, Islam, Traditional African religions, Afro-American religions

Related ethnic groups
- Africans

The African diaspora is the worldwide collection of communities that descended from people from Africa. The term most commonly refers to emigrants of people of African heritage but could also refer to descendants of enslaved Africans. Scholars typically identify "four circulatory phases" of this migration out of Africa.

The phrase African diaspora gradually entered common usage at the turn of the 21st century. The term diaspora originates from the Greek word διασπορά (diaspora, "scattering") which gained popularity in English in reference to the Jewish diaspora before being more broadly applied to other populations. Less commonly, the term has been used in scholarship to refer to more recent emigration from Africa.

The African Union (AU) defines the African diaspora as consisting: "of people of native or partial African origin living outside the continent, irrespective of their citizenship and nationality and who are willing to contribute to the development of the continent and the building of the African Union". Its constitutive act declares that it shall "invite and encourage the full participation of the African diaspora as an important part of our continent, in the building of the African Union".

== History ==
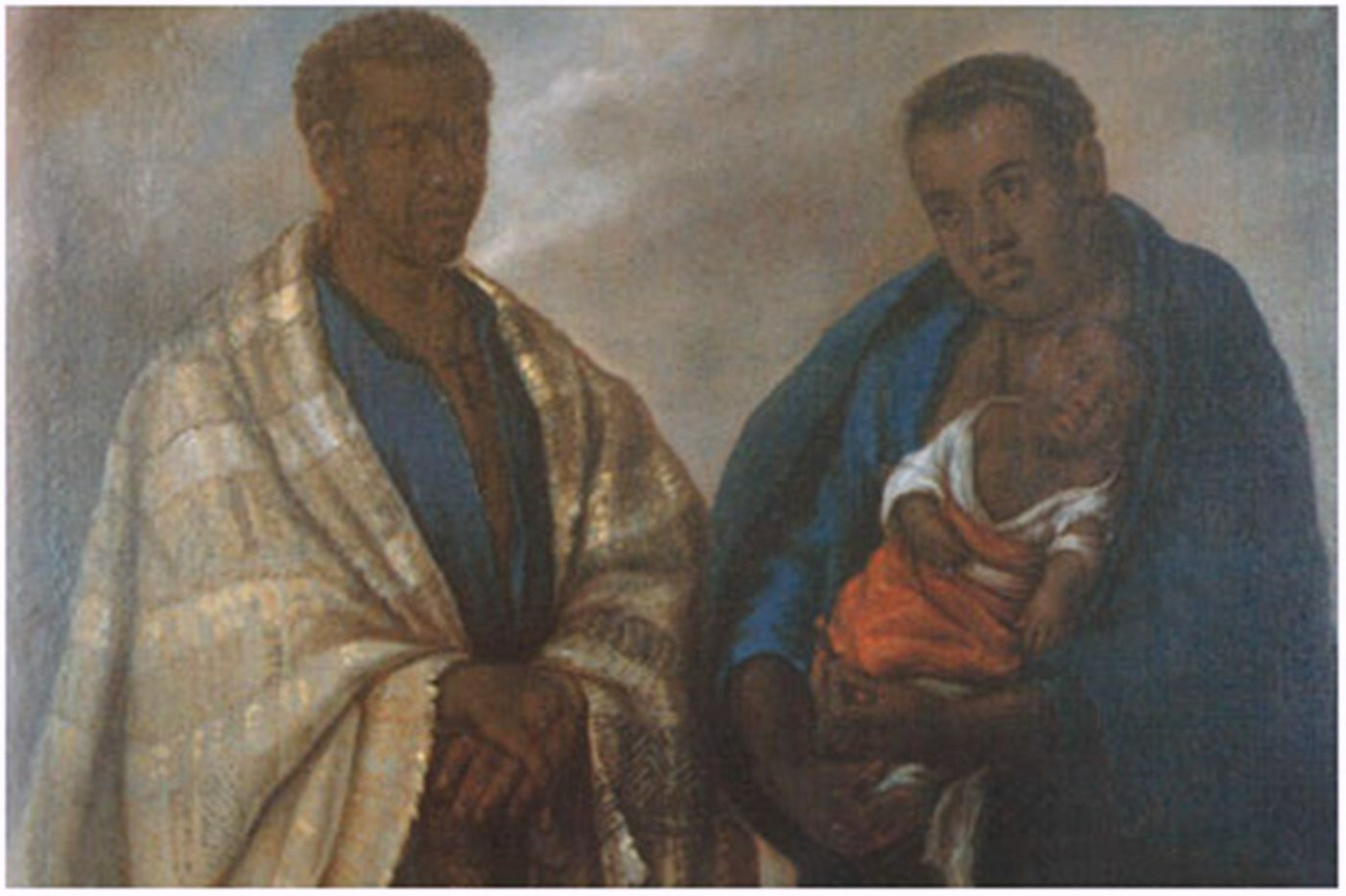
18th-century painting showing a family of Africans

In the late 20th century, Africans began to emigrate to Europe and the Americas in increasing numbers, constituting new African diaspora communities.

In the Americas, the confluence of multiple ethnic groups from around the world contributed to multi-ethnic societies. In Central and South America, most people are descended from European, Native American, and African ancestry. In 1888, in Brazil nearly half the population were people of African descent, the variation of physical characteristics extends across a broad range.

== Concepts and definitions ==
The African Union defined the African diaspora as "[consisting] of people of African origin living outside the continent, irrespective of their citizenship and nationality and who are willing to contribute to the development of the continent and the building of the African Union." Its constitutive act declares that it shall "invite and encourage the full participation of the African diaspora as an important part of our continent, in the building of the African Union."

Between 1500 and 1900, approximately four million enslaved Africans were transported to island plantations in the Indian Ocean as part of the Indian Ocean slave trade, roughly eight million were shipped northwards as part of the Trans-Saharan slave trade, and roughly eleven million were transported to the Americas as part of the Atlantic slave trade. The diaspora that resulted from the Atlantic slave trade, specifically, may also be referred to as the black diaspora.

=== Social and political ===
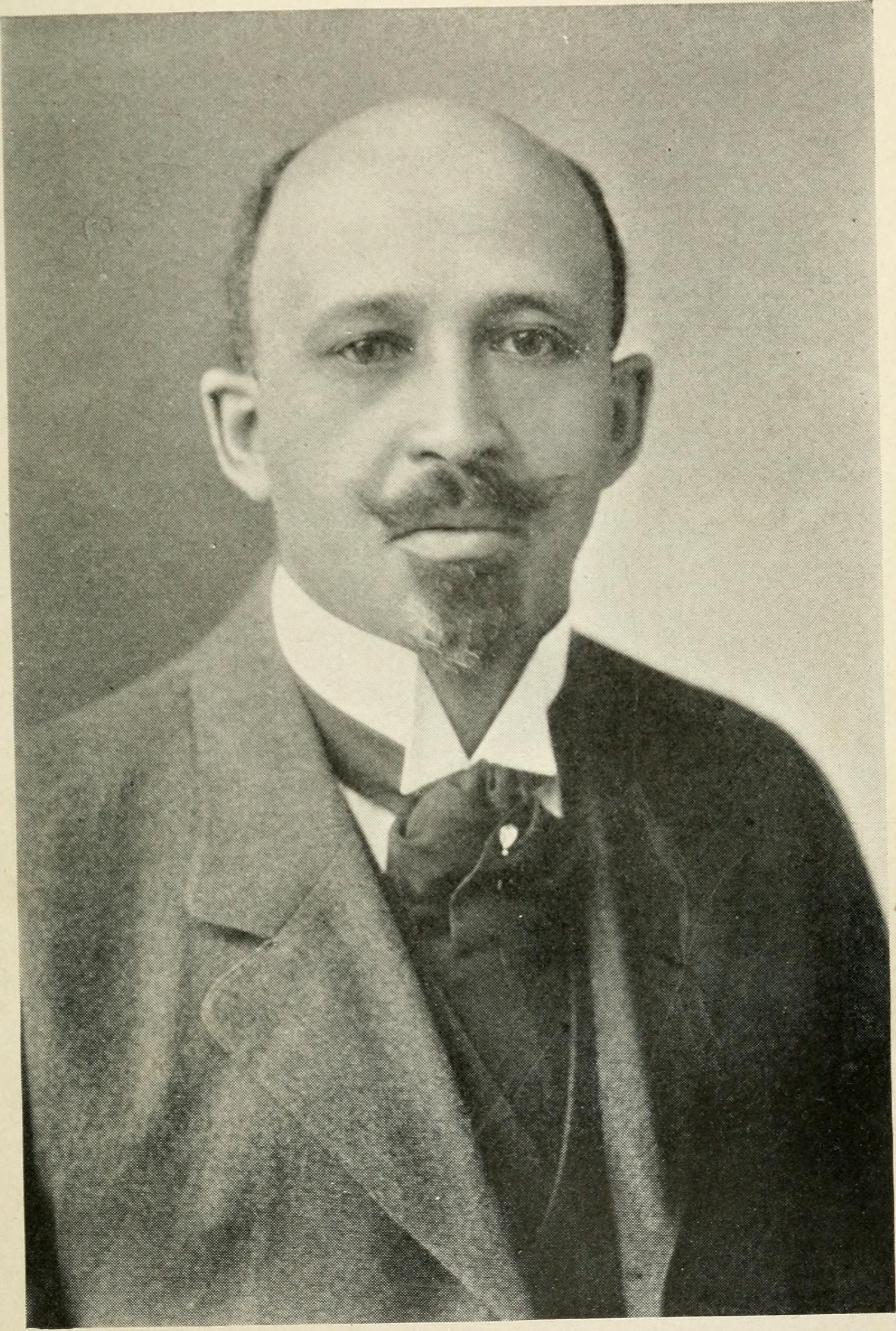
20th-century American philosopher and sociologist W. E. B. Du Bois wrote extensively on the black experience in his homeland and abroad; he spent the last two years of his life in the newly independent Ghana and got citizenship there.

Many scholars have challenged conventional views of the African diaspora as a mere dispersion of African people. For them, it is a movement of liberation that opposes the implications of racialization. Their position assumes that Africans and their descendants abroad struggle to reclaim power over their lives through voluntary migration, cultural production and political conceptions and practices. It also implies the presence of cultures of resistance with similar objectives throughout the global diaspora. Thinkers like W. E. B. Dubois and more recently Robin Kelley, for example, have argued that black politics of survival reveal more about the meaning of the African diaspora than labels of ethnicity and race, and degrees of skin hue. From this view, the daily struggle against what they call the "world-historical processes" of racial colonization, capitalism, and Western domination defines blacks' links to Africa.

=== African diaspora and modernity ===
In the last decades, studies on the African diaspora have shown an interest in the roles that Africans played in bringing about modernity. This trend also opposes the traditional eurocentric perspective that has dominated history books showing Africans and its diasporans as primitive victims of slavery, and without historical agency. According to historian Patrick Manning, blacks toiled at the center of forces that created the modern world. Paul Gilroy describes the suppression of blackness due to imagined and created ideals of nations as "cultural insiderism". Cultural insiderism is used by nations to separate deserving and undeserving groups and requires a "sense of ethnic difference" as mentioned in his book The Black Atlantic. Recognizing their contributions offers a comprehensive appreciation of global history.

=== Culture and literature ===
The African diaspora has made significant contributions to global culture, particularly in music and literature. Musical forms include music from Black communities in the Americas and the Caribbean, such as jazz, reggae, samba, and hip-hop. Originating in the Bronx, hip-hop was created by Black Americans and Afro-Caribbeans. It has become a popular genre worldwide.

Writers from the diaspora have also contributed significantly, sharing stories about identity, family, migration, and belonging. Through literature, the diaspora has given a voice to their experiences. African diaspora's influences are common, from the songs people listen to to the books they read, showing how the diaspora culture impacts the modern world.

=== Richard Iton's view of diaspora ===
Cultural and political theorist Richard Iton suggested that diaspora be understood as a "culture of dislocation". For Iton, the traditional approach to the African diaspora focuses on the ruptures associated with the Atlantic slave trade and Middle Passage, notions of dispersal, and "the cycle of retaining, redeeming, refusing, and retrieving 'Africa.'" This conventional framework for analyzing the diaspora is dangerous, according to Iton, because it presumes that diaspora exists outside of Africa, thus simultaneously disowning and desiring Africa. Further, Iton suggests a new starting principle for the use of diaspora: "the impossibility of settlement that correlates throughout the modern period with the cluster of disturbances that trouble not only the physically dispersed but those moved without traveling." Iton adds that this impossibility of settlement—this "modern matrix of strange spaces—outside the state but within the empire"—renders notions of black citizenship fanciful, and in fact, "undesirable". Iton argues that we citizenship, a state of statelessness thereby deconstructing colonial sites and narratives in an effort to "de-link geography and power", putting "all space into play" (emphasis added) For Iton, diaspora's potential is represented by a "rediscursive albeit agonistic field of play that might denaturalize the hegemonic representations of modernity as unencumbered and self-generating and bring into clear view its repressed, colonial subscript".

=== Definition of the African diaspora ===
A diaspora is defined as a dispersion of a people, language, or culture that was formerly concentrated in one place, to scatter, to displace, to live in separated communities.

The African diaspora is defined as including all African descendants to various parts of the world, particularly of slave trades such as the Trans-Atlantic slave trade, which includes mixed-race people with African ancestry and therefore does not rely on only self-identifying as black. In multiple Latin American countries, many mixed-race people have African ancestry and therefore are considered afrodescendants.

Many other diasporas around the world also include people with only partial ancestry, such as:

- The Jewish diaspora includes individuals with Jewish ancestry–such as one Jewish grandparent–even if they do not practise Judaism or identify as Jewish. For example, Israel's Law of Return grants rights based on descent, not ethnic or religious identity.
- The Chinese diaspora encompasses people in countries like Peru, the Philippines, or Thailand who may be partially Chinese but do not speak Chinese, practise Chinese customs, or self-identify as ethnically Chinese.
- The Indian diaspora includes anyone of Indian origin. The Indian government tracks data on Overseas Indians, which includes anyone of Indian descent living abroad. This group is divided into Non-Resident Indians (NRIs)–Indian citizens living overseas–and Persons of Indian Origin (PIOs) who are foreign nationals with Indian ancestry. PIOs often include people in Southern Africa and the Caribbean descended from 19th-century Indian indentured labourers, many of whom are mixed race. The Indian government has even classified Romani people as PIOs due to their ancestral migration from India to Europe between the 9th and 14th centuries.

In Latin America, the term also functions this way, such as pardo Brazilians being classified as afrodescendant–or of African ancestry–but explicitly not black (preto) as per census

In all these cases, diasporic labels are used to recognise lineage and historical connection rather than present-day identity. Afrodescendant inclusion functions similarly: it marks ancestry, not how someone chooses to identify in daily life, in which mixed-race people, such as pardo Brazilians or mixed Dominicans, are of African ancestry, as well as others.

== Populations and estimated distribution ==
African diaspora populations include:

- African Americans, Afro-Caribbeans, Afro-Latin Americans, Black Canadians – descendants of mostly enslaved West and Central Africans brought to the United States, the Caribbean, Central America and South America during the Atlantic slave trade.
- Afro-Arabs (Afro-Saudis, Afro-Omanis, Afro-Syrians, Afro-Palestinians, Afro-Iraqis, Afro-Jordanians, etc.), Afro-Iranians, Afro-Turks – descendants of Zanj slaves whose ancestors were brought to the Near East and other parts of Asia during the Indian Ocean slave trade.
- Siddis – descendants of Zanj slaves whose ancestors were brought to the Indian subcontinent (Pakistan and India). Also referred to as the Makrani in Pakistan.

Continent or region	Country population	Afro-descendants	African and African-mixed population
Caribbean	41,309,327	67%	27,654,061
Saint Kitts and Nevis	39,619	98%	38,827
Dominica	71,293	96% (87% African + 9% Mixed)	61,882 + 9,411
Haiti	10,646,714	95%	10,114,378
Antigua and Barbuda	78,000	95%	63,000
Jamaica	2,812,090	92.1%	2,663,614
Grenada	110,000	91%	101,309
The Bahamas	332,634	90.6% (African + British mixed)	301,366
Barbados	281,968	90%	253,771
Netherlands Antilles	225,369	85%	191,564
Saint Vincent and the Grenadines	118,432	85%	100,667
British Virgin Islands	24,004	83%	19,923
Saint Lucia	172,884	83%	142,629
Dominican Republic	10,090,000	83% (11% Afro, 72% Mixed)	1,109,900 + 8,000,000
US Virgin Islands	108,210	80%	86,243
Bermuda	66,536	61%	40,720
Cayman Islands	47,862	60%	28,717
Cuba	11,116,396	35%	3,890,738
Trinidad and Tobago	1,215,527	34.2%	415,710
Puerto Rico	3,285,874	17.5% (African + Taino mixed)	558,598
South America	388,570,461	N/A	N/A
French Guiana	199,509	66%	131,676
Suriname	632,638	37%	223,718
Guyana	770,794	36%	277,486
Colombia	53,093,632	10.6–25% (10% African, 15% Mulattoes, Mixed and other groups)	7,800,000–13,000,000; Some studies (from the United Nations) suggests that the percentage of Afro-Colombians (including mixed race groups) are around 25% or lower than the entire population in Colombia. The city of Quibdo, (Chocó) has the highest percentage of Afro-Colombians than any other city in the country with 95.3% of its residents. The Colombian government estimates that 10.6% of Colombia's population are entirely of African descent.
Brazil	203,062,512 (2022 census)	55.5%? (2022 census) (Note: This figure includes the self-identified "mixed" population, which is construed in some sources as being of African descent, and is in others stated to include those of mixed-indigenous ancestry without specific distinction of those persons' of African descent status; and adding it to the self-identified "preto/a" population.)	112,699,694
Ecuador	13,927,650	5%	680,000
Uruguay	3,494,382	4%	255,074
Venezuela	31,200,000 (2015 projection)	55% (African descent) (Note: The World Bank estimated that approximately 55% of Venezuela's population was of African descent, including people classified as moreno, projecting 17.1 million Afro-Venezuelans for 2015. By comparison, Venezuela's 2011 census recorded a population of 27,227,930, with 2.9% identifying as Black and 0.7% identifying as Afro-descendant. The figures use different definitions of ethnicity and ancestry.)	17,100,000 (2015 estimate)
Peru	29,496,000	3%	828,841
Chile	17,094,270	1%	170,943*
Argentina	46,044,703	<1%	302,936
Bolivia	10,027,254	<1%	23,330
Paraguay	6,109,903	<1%	8,013
North America	450,545,368	10%	42,907,538
United States	328,745,538	12%	42,020,743 According to the genomics company 23andMe, less than 4% of White Americans have 1% or more of African ancestry. Including this figure changes the total to 49,241,508
Canada	39,566,248	4%	1,547,870
Mexico	108,700,891	1%	1,386,556
Central America	41,283,652	4%	1,453,761
Belize	301,270	31%	93,394
Panama	3,292,693	11%	362,196
Nicaragua	5,785,846	9%	520,726
Costa Rica	4,195,914	3%	125,877
Honduras	7,639,327	2%	152,787
Europe	738,856,462	1%	< 8,000,000
France	68,000,000	8%	Approximately 3–5 millions. It is illegal for the French State to collect data on ethnicity and race.
Portugal	10,467,366	7%	up to ~ 700,000 (People with recent immigrant background are only 325,000 (2023)) It is illegal for the Portuguese State to collect data on ethnicity and race. the percentage is likely much higher.
United Kingdom	67,886,004	5% (inc. partial)	3,000,000
Netherlands	16,491,461	3%	-
Belgium	10,666,866	3%	~300,000
Spain	47,615,033	2,5% (including Maghrebis)	1,206,701 (Of those ~300,000 are Black Sub-Saharan African)
Sweden	10,379,295 (2020)	2.3%	236,975 (2020)
Italy	60,795,612	2% (including Maghrebis)	1,036,653 (Of those ~450,000 are Black Sub-Saharan African)
Ireland	4,339,000	1.38%	64,639
Germany	82,000,000	1.2% (including Maghrebis)	1,000,000 (Of those ~500,000 are Black Sub-Saharan African)
Finland	5,603,851 (2023)	1.26%	70,592 (2023)
Norway	4,858,199	1%	67,000
Switzerland	7,790,000	1%	57,000
Russia	141,594,000	<1%	50,000
Asia	3,879,000,000	<1%	≈327,904
Israel	7,411,000	3%	200,000
India	1,132,446,000	<1%	40,000
Malaysia	28,334,135	<1%	31,904
Hong Kong	7,200,000	<1%	< 20,000
China	1,321,851,888	<1%	16,000
Japan	127,756,815	<1%	10,000

== The Americas ==
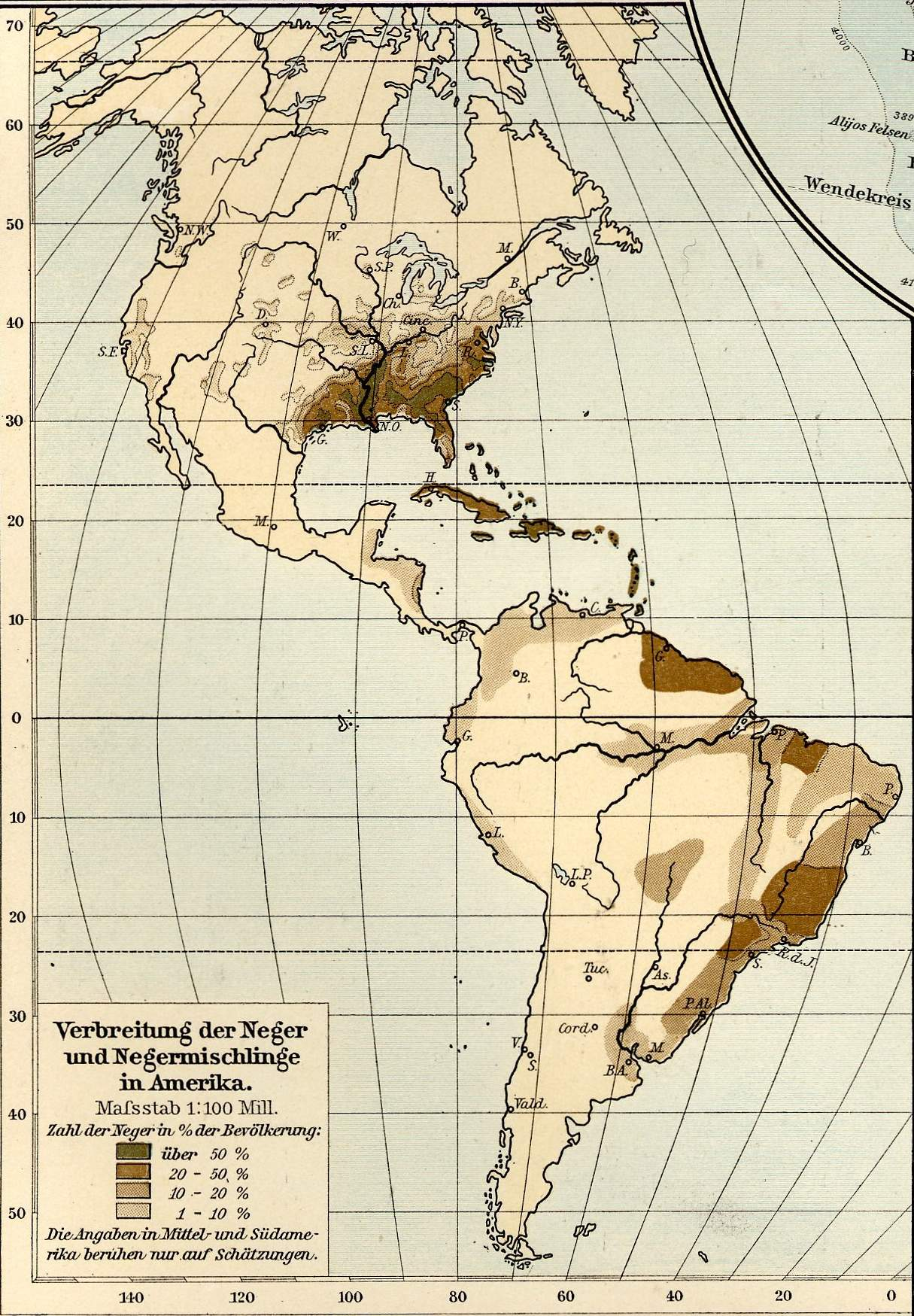
Map of the Black African population in the Americas (1901).

- African Americans – There are an estimated 43 million people of black African descent in the United States.
- Afro-Latin Americans – An estimation from the Pew Research Center calculates about 100 million people of African Descent. It's important to note, however, that the racial classification criteria used in the US can differ markedly from the racial classification criteria used in other countries in the region and from how other populations perceive their own racial identification. There are also sizeable African-descended populations in Cuba, Haiti, Colombia and Dominican Republic, often with ancestry of other major ethnic groups.
- Afro-Caribbeans – The population in the Caribbean is approximately 23 million. Significant numbers of African-descended people include Haiti – 8 million, Dominican Republic – 7.9 million, and Jamaica – 2.7 million,

=== Caribbean ===
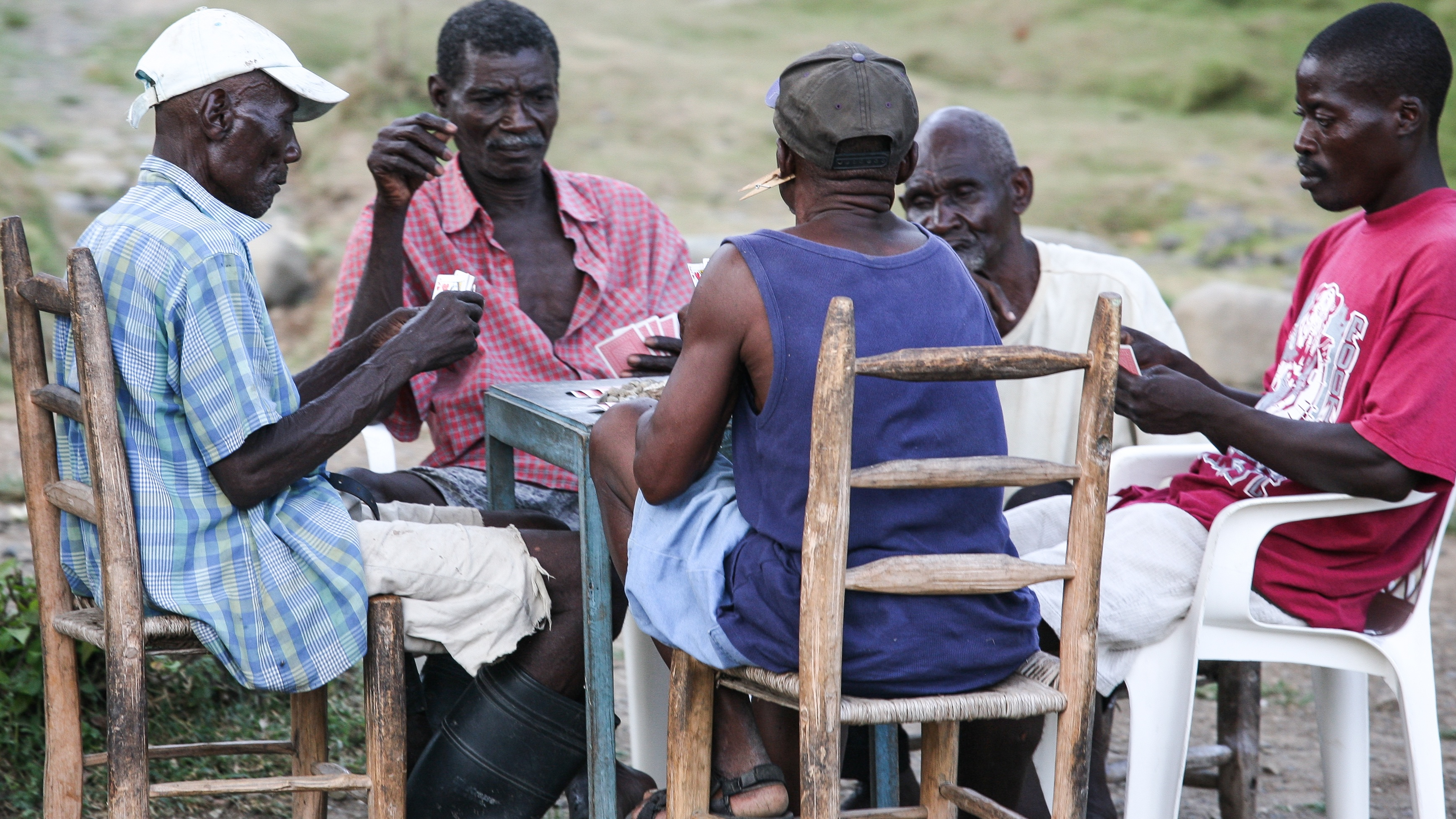
Haiti has the largest Afro-Caribbean population (almost 11 million) and also has the highest percentage of its population descended from the African diaspora (95%).

The first Africans in the Americas arrived in the region during the initial period of European colonization. In 1492, Afro-Spanish sailor Pedro Alonso Niño served as a pilot on the voyages of Christopher Columbus; though he returned to the Americas in 1499, Niño did not settle in the region. By the early 16th century, more Africans began to arrive in Spanish colonies in the Americas, sometimes as free people of color, but the majority were enslaved. Demand of African labor increased as the indigenous population of the Americas experienced a massive population decline due to the introduction of Eurasian infectious diseases (such as smallpox) to which they had no natural immunity. The Spanish Crown granted asientos (monopoly contracts) to merchants granting them the right to supply enslaved Africans in to Spanish colonies in the Americas, regulating the trade. As other European nations began establishing colonies in the Americas, these new colonies began importing enslaved Africans as well.

During the 17th and 18th centuries, most European colonies in the Caribbean operated on plantation economies fueled by slave labor, and the resulting importation of enslaved Africans meant that Afro-Caribbeans soon far outnumbered their European enslavers in terms of population. Roughly eleven to twelve million enslaved Africans were transported to the Americas as part of the transatlantic slave trade.

Beginning in 1791, the Haitian Revolution, a slave rebellion by self-emancipated slaves in the French colony of Saint-Domingue eventually led to the creation of the Republic of Haiti. The new state, led by Jean Jacques Dessalines was the first nation in the Americas to be established from a successful slave revolt and represented a challenge to the existing slave systems in the region. Continuous waves of slave rebellions, such as the Baptist War led by Samuel Sharpe in British Jamaica, created the conditions for the incremental abolition of slavery in the region, with Great Britain abolishing it in the 1830s. The Spanish colony of Cuba was the last Caribbean island to emancipate its slaves.

During the 20th century, Afro-Caribbean people began to assert their cultural, economic and political rights on the world stage. The Jamaican Marcus Garvey formed the UNIA movement in the United States, continuing with Aimé Césaire's négritude movement, which was intended to create a pan-African movement across national lines. From the 1960s, the decolonization of the Americas led to various Caribbean countries gaining their independence from European colonial rule. They were pre-eminent in creating new cultural forms such as calypso, reggae music, and Rastafari within the Caribbean. Beyond the region, a new Afro-Caribbean diaspora, including such figures as Stokely Carmichael and DJ Kool Herc in the United States, was influential in the creation of the black power and hip-hop movements. Influential political theorists such as Walter Rodney, Frantz Fanon and Stuart Hall contributed to anti-colonial theory and movements in Africa, as well as cultural developments in Europe.

=== North America ===
==== United States ====
Several migration waves to the Americas, as well as relocations within the Americas, have brought people of African descent to North America. According to the Schomburg Center for Research in Black Culture, the first African populations came to North America in the 16th century via Mexico and the Caribbean to the Spanish colonies of Florida, Texas and other parts of the South. Out of the 12 million people from Africa who were shipped to the Americas during the transatlantic slave trade, 645,000 were shipped to the British colonies on the North American mainland and the United States. In 2000, African Americans comprised 12.1 percent of the total population in the United States, constituting the largest racial minority group. The African-American population is concentrated in the southern states and urban areas.

In the establishment of the African diaspora, the transatlantic slave trade is often considered the defining element, but people of African descent have engaged in eleven other migration movements involving North America since the 16th century, many being voluntary migrations, although undertaken in exploitative and hostile environments.

In the 1860s, people from sub-Saharan Africa, mainly from West Africa and the Cape Verde Islands, started to arrive in a voluntary immigration wave to seek employment as whalers in Massachusetts. This migration continued until restrictive laws were enacted in 1921 that in effect closed the door on non-Europeans. By that time, men of African ancestry were already a majority in New England's whaling industry, with African Americans working as sailors, blacksmiths, shipbuilders, officers, and owners. The internationalism of whaling crews, including the character Daggoo, an African harpooneer, is recorded in the 1851 novel Moby-Dick. They eventually took their trade to California.

Today 1.7 million people in the United States are descended from voluntary immigrants from sub-Saharan Africa, most of whom arrived in the late twentieth century. African immigrants represent 6 percent of all immigrants to the United States and almost 5 percent of the African-American community nationwide. About 57 percent immigrated between 1990 and 2000. Immigrants born in Africa constitute 1.6 percent of the black population. People of the African immigrant diaspora are the most educated population group in the United States—50 percent have bachelor's or advanced degrees, compared to 23 percent of native-born Americans. The largest African immigrant communities in the United States are in New York, followed by California, Texas, and Maryland.

Due to the legacy of slavery in the colonial history of the United States, the average African American has a significant European component to his DNA. According to a study conducted in 2011, the African American DNA consists on average of 73.2% West African, 24% European and 0.8% Native American DNA. The European ancestry of African Americans is largely patrilineal with an estimated 19% of African American ancestors being European males, and 5% being European females. The interracial mixing occurred before the Civil War and largely in the American South, beginning during the colonial era.

The states with the highest percentages of people of African descent are Mississippi (36%), and Louisiana (33%). While not a state, the population of the District of Columbia is more than 50% black. Recent African immigrants represent a minority of black people nationwide. The U.S. Bureau of the Census categorizes the population by race based on self-identification. The census surveys have no provision for a "multiracial" or "biracial" self-identity, but since 2000, respondents may check off more than one box and claim multiple ethnicity that way.

==== Canada ====
Much of the earliest black presence in Canada came from the newly independent United States after the American Revolution. The British resettled African Americans (known as Black Loyalists) primarily in Nova Scotia. These were primarily former slaves who had escaped to British lines for promised freedom during the Revolution.

Later during the antebellum years, other individual African Americans escaped to Canada, mostly to locations in Southwestern Ontario, via the Underground Railroad, a system supported by both blacks and whites to assist fugitive slaves. After achieving independence, northern states in the U.S. had begun to abolish slavery as early as 1793, but slavery was not abolished in the South until 1865, following the American Civil War.

Black immigration to Canada in the twentieth century consisted mostly of Caribbean descent. As a result of the prominence of Caribbean immigration, the term "African Canadian", while sometimes used to refer to the minority of Canadian blacks who have direct African or African-American heritage, is not normally used to denote black Canadians. Blacks of Caribbean origin are usually denoted as "West Indian Canadian", "Caribbean Canadian" or more rarely "Afro-Caribbean Canadian", but there remains no widely used alternative to "Black Canadian" which is considered inclusive of the African, Afro-Caribbean, and African-American black communities in Canada.

=== Central America and South America ===
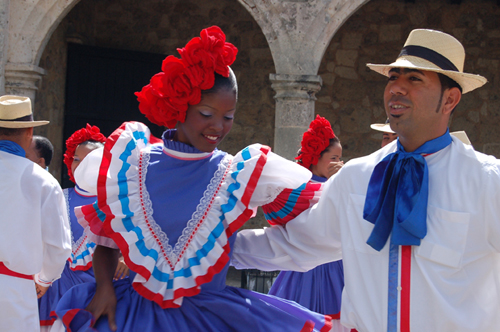
The racial make-up of the Dominican Republic includes many Afro-Caribbeans, mestizos, Taíno-descended persons, and whites.

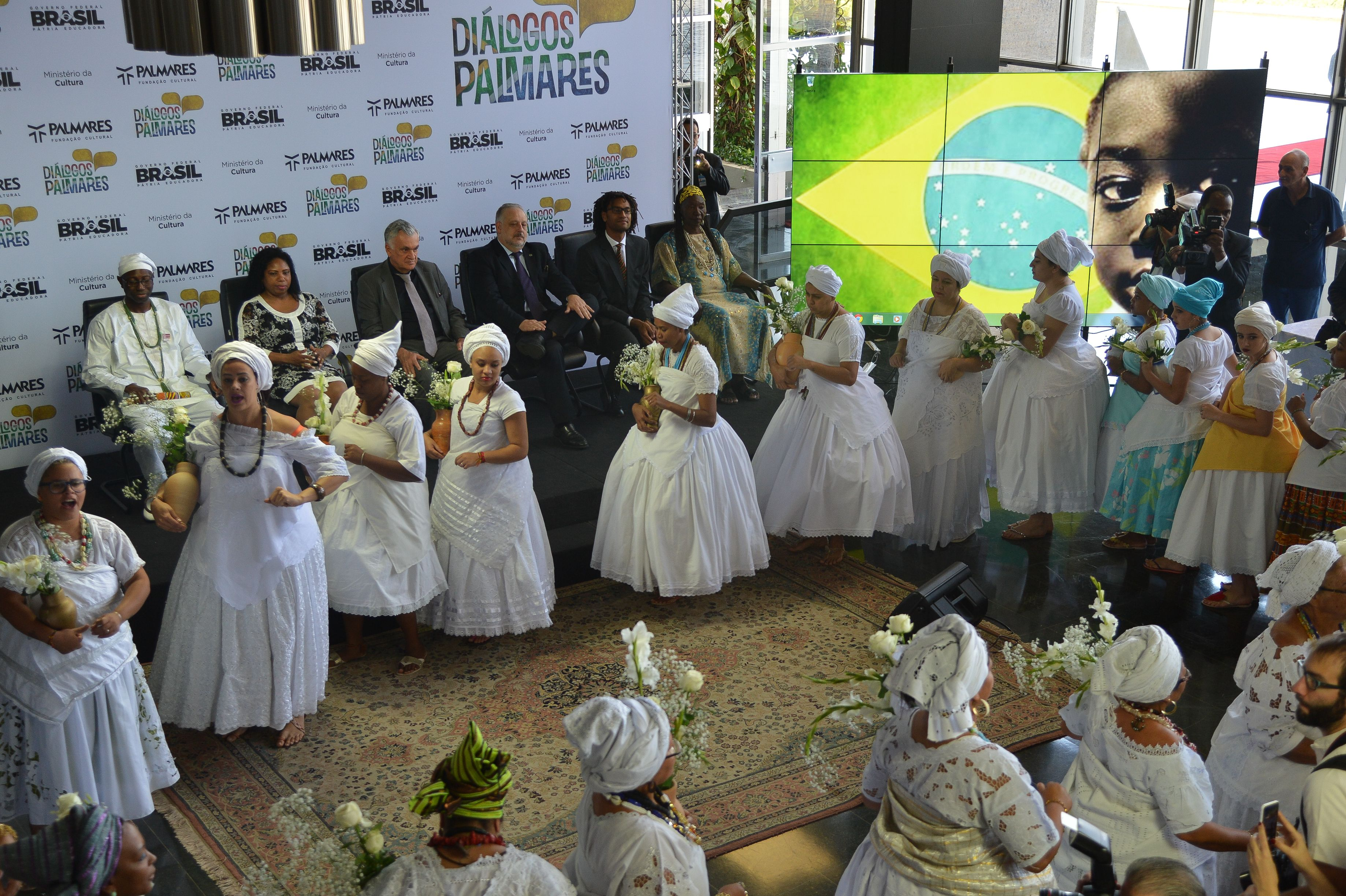
Afro-Brazilians celebrating at a ceremony held by the Ministry of Culture.

At an intermediate level, in South America and in the former plantations in and around the Indian Ocean, descendants of enslaved people are a bit harder to define because many people are mixed in demographic proportion to the original slave population. In places that imported relatively few slaves (like Chile), few if any are considered "black" today. In places that imported many enslaved people (like Brazil or Dominican Republic), the number is larger, though most identify themselves as being of mixed, rather than strictly African, ancestry. In places like Brazil and the Dominican Republic, blackness is performed in more taboo ways than it is in, say, the United States. The idea behind Trey Ellis Cultural Mulatto comes into play as there are blurred lines between what is considered as black.

In Colombia, the African slaves were first brought to work in the gold mines of the Department of Antioquia. After this was no longer a profitable business, these slaves slowly moved to the Pacific coast, where they have remained unmixed with the white or Indian population until today. The whole Department of Chocó remains a black area. Mixture with white population happened mainly in the Caribbean coast, which is a mestizo area until today. There was also a greater mixture in the south-western departments of Cauca and Valle del Cauca. In these mestizo areas the African culture has had a great influence.

In Central America, Afro-indigenous people, also known as Caribs or Garifuna(Carib and African descent) migrated to Central America to save themselves from forced enslavement.These people trace their origin to the Saint Vincent island.The original exiled population of 3000 people has now grown into an estimated 60000 people.The community has retained its Afro indigenous culture.The community makes around 1 to 2% of the population in Guatemala, Nicaragua, Honduras, and Belize.Many also live in the United states. The people have retained their language, beliefs and the associated rituals.

== Europe ==
Some European countries make it illegal to collect demographic census information based on ethnicity or ancestry (e.g. France), but some others do query along racial lines (e.g. the UK). Of 42 countries surveyed by a European Commission against Racism and Intolerance study in 2007, it was found that 29 collected official statistics on country of birth, 37 on citizenship, 24 on religion, 26 on language, 6 on country of birth of parents, and 22 on nationality or ethnicity.

=== France ===
Estimates of 3 to 5 million of African descent, although one quarter of the Afro-French population live in overseas territories. This number is difficult to estimate because the French census does not use race as a category for ideological reasons.

=== Germany ===
As of 2020, there were approximately 1,000,000 Afro-Germans. This number is difficult to estimate because the German census does not use race as a category.

=== Georgia ===
Some black people of unknown origin (though perceived as Ethiopians) once inhabited southern Abkhazia; today, they have been assimilated into the Abkhaz population.

=== Italy ===
African emigrants to Italy include Italian citizens and residents originally from Africa; immigrants from Africa officially residing in Italy in 2015 numbered over 1 million residents.

=== Netherlands ===
There are an estimated 500,000 African or mixed African people in the Netherlands and the Dutch Antilles. They mainly live in the islands of Aruba, Bonaire, Curaçao and Saint Martin, the latter of which is also partly French-controlled. Many Afro-Dutch people reside in the Netherlands.

=== Portugal ===
As of 2023, is up to 700,000 people of recent Native African immigrant background living in Portugal. They mainly live in the regions of Lisbon metropolitan area. As Portugal doesn't collect information dealing with ethnicity, the estimate includes only people that, as of 2023, hold the citizenship of an African country or people who have acquired Portuguese citizenship from 2008 to 2021, thus excluding descendants, people of more distant African ancestry or people who have settled in Portugal generations ago and are now Portuguese citizens.

=== Spain ===
As of 2021, there were 1,206,701 Africans. They mainly live in the regions of Andalusia, Catalonia, Madrid and the Canaries.

=== United Kingdom ===
There are about 2,500,000 (4.2%) people identifying as Black British (not including British Mixed), among which are Afro-Caribbeans. They live mostly in urban areas in England.

== Eurasia ==
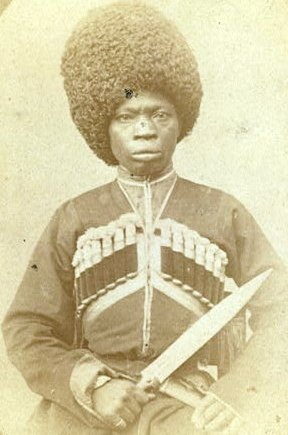
Ethnic Caucasian of African origin

=== Russia ===
The first Black people in Russia were the result of the slave trade of the Ottoman Empire and their descendants still live on the coasts of the Black Sea. Czar Peter the Great was advised by his friend Lefort to bring in Africans to Russia for hard labor. Alexander Pushkin's great-grandfather was the African princeling Abram Petrovich Gannibal, who became Peter's protégé, was educated as a military engineer in France, and eventually became general-en-chef, responsible for the building of sea forts and canals in Russia.

During the 1930s fifteen Black American families moved to the Soviet Union as agricultural experts. As African states became independent in the 1960s, the Soviet Union offered their citizens the chance to study in Russia; over 40 years, 400,000 African students came, and some settled there.

=== Turkey ===
Afro-Turks are people of Zanj (Bantu) descent living in Turkey. Like the Afro-Abkhazians, they trace their origins to the Ottoman slave trade. Beginning several centuries ago, a number of Africans came to the Ottoman Empire, usually via Zanzibar as Zanj and from places such as present-day Niger, Saudi Arabia, Libya, Kenya and Sudan; they settled by the Dalaman, Menderes and Gediz valleys, Manavgat, and Çukurova. In the 19th century, contemporary records mention African quarters of İzmir, including Sabırtaşı, Dolapkuyu, Tamaşalık, İkiçeşmelik, and Ballıkuyu. Africans in Turkey are around 100.000 people.

== Asia ==
=== South Asia ===
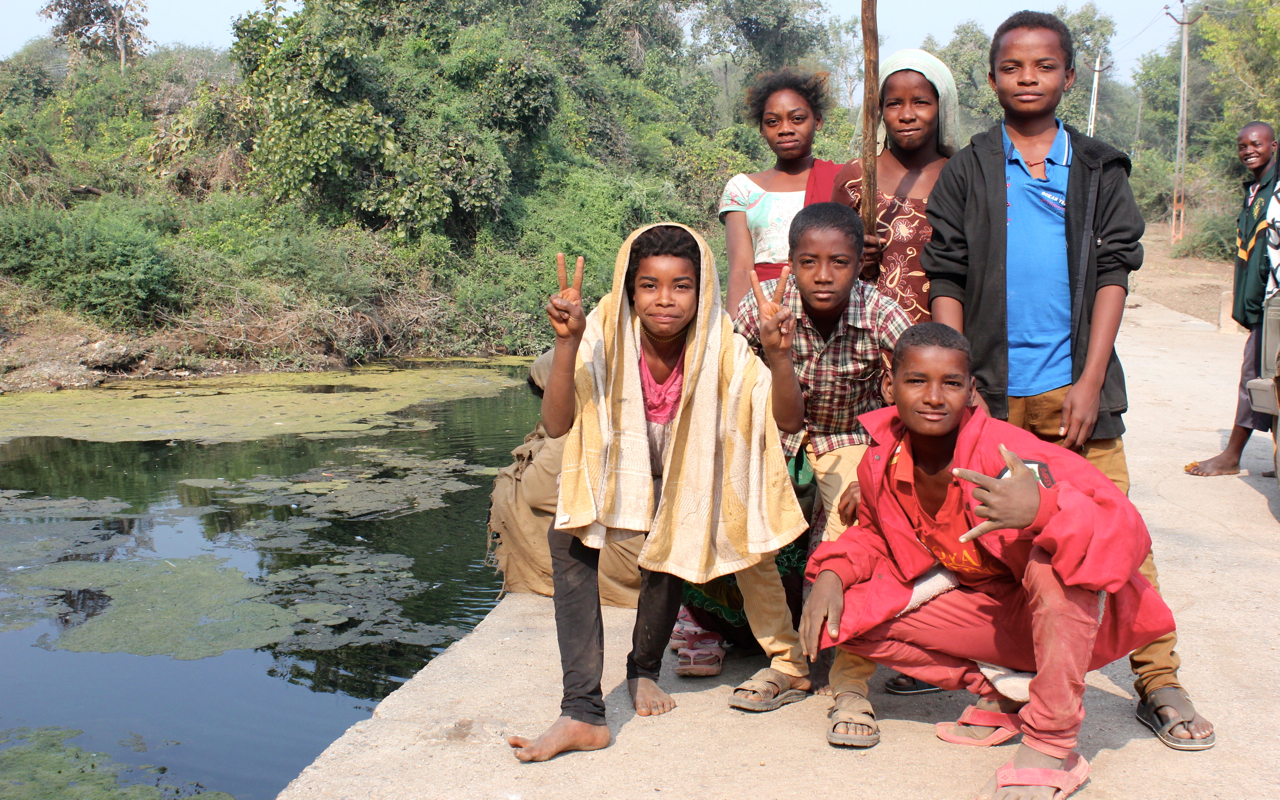
A group of Siddi from the state of Gujarat in India

There are a number of communities in South Asia that are descended from African slaves, traders or soldiers. These communities are the Siddi, Sheedi, Makrani and Sri Lanka Kaffirs. In some cases, they became very prominent, such as Jamal-ud-Din Yaqut, Hoshu Sheedi, Malik Ambar, or the rulers of Janjira State. The Mauritian creole people are the descendants of African slaves similar to those in the Americas.

==== Siddi people ====
The Siddi (pronounced [sɪd̪d̪i]), also known as the Sheedi, Sidi, Siddhi, or Habshi, are an ethnic group inhabiting India and Pakistan. Members are mostly descended from the Bantu peoples of Southeast Africa, along with Habesha immigrants. Some were merchants, sailors, indentured servants, slaves and mercenaries. The Siddi population is currently estimated at 850,000 individuals, with Karnataka, Gujarat and Telangana states in India and Makran and Karachi in Pakistan as the main population centres. Siddis are primarily Muslims, although some are Hindus and others belong to the Catholic Church.

Although often economically and socially marginalised as a community today, Siddis once ruled Bengal as the Habshi dynasty of the Bengal Sultanate, while the famous Siddi, Malik Ambar, effectively controlled the Ahmadnagar Sultanate. He played a major role, politically and militarily, in Indian history by slowing down the penetration of the Delhi-based Mughals into the Deccan Plateau of South central India.

=== Southeast Asia ===
Some Pan-Africanists also consider other peoples as diasporic African peoples. These groups include, among others, Negritos, such as in the case of the peoples of the Malay Peninsula (Orang Asli); New Guinea (Papuans); Andamanese; certain peoples of the Indian subcontinent, and the aboriginal peoples of Melanesia and Micronesia. Most of these claims are rejected by mainstream ethnologists as pseudoscience and pseudo-anthropology, as part of ideologically motivated Afrocentrist irredentism, touted primarily among some extremist elements in the United States who do not reflect on the mainstream African-American community. Mainstream anthropologists determine that the Andamanese and others are part of a network of autochthonous ethnic groups present in South Asia that trace their genetic ancestry to a migratory sequence that culminated in the Australian Aboriginals rather than from Africa directly. Genetic testing has shown the Andamani to belong to the Y-Chromosome Haplogroup D-M174, which is in common with Australian Aboriginals and the Ainu people of Japan rather than the actual African diaspora.

=== West Asia ===
The Kingdom of Aksum at its height, with a presence on the Arabian peninsula outside of the African continent

The Kingdom of Aksum was an ancient empire in what is now northern Ethiopia. There were four invasions and subsequent settlements of Aksumites in Himyar, located across the Red Sea in modern-day Yemen. These invasions and settlements led to one of the first large-scale African diasporas in the ancient world.

In 517 AD, the Himyarite king Ma'adikarib was overthrown by Dhu Nuwas, a Jewish leader who began persecuting Christians and confiscating trade goods between Aksum and the Byzantine Empire, both of which were Christian nations. According to the Book of the Himyarites, a man identified as Bishop Thomas journeyed to Aksum to report on the persecution of Christians in Himyar to the Aksumite Kingdom. As a result, the Aksumite king Ahayawa invaded Himyar. Dhu Nuwas fled this first invasion, and at least 580 Aksumite soldiers remained in Himyar. Himyarites who opposed Aksumite settlement united under Dhu Nuwas, and the formerly expelled king traveled back to kill the Aksumite soldiers and continue the oppression of Christians, forcing some settlers back into Aksum.

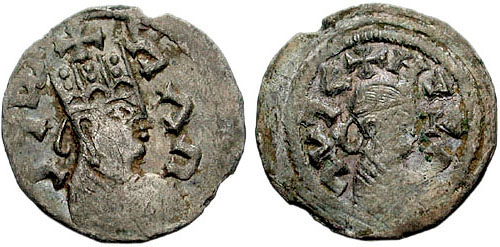
Coin of Kaleb

In response to Dhu Nuwas's Christian persecution, the new Aksumite king Kaleb first sent a group of Himyarite refugees in his Aksumite kingdom back into Himyar to stir up underground resistance against Dhu Nuwas. These discontented Himyarites then united under nobleman Sumyafa Ashwa. Kaleb successfully invaded Himyar with an Aksumite army in 525 and installed Sumyafa Ashwa to rule. More Aksumite soldiers remained in Himyar to claim land. The Byzantine ruler Justinian learned of this development and sent an ambassador, Julianus, to ally Aksum and Himyar with the Byzantine Empire against Persia. The overtures made by the Byzantine Empire to influence Himyar demonstrate that the Aksumite settlers in Himyar, due to their sustained residence and political organization, constituted a "stable community in exile", which historian Carlton Wilson deems a necessary condition to classify a settlement as a diaspora. Justinian had two wishes for this proposed alliance: first, for Aksum to purchase and distribute Indian silk to the Byzantine Empire to undermine Persia economically, and second, for Aksum-ruled Himyar to invade Persia, led by the general Caisus. Both of these plans failed, as Persia's proximity to India made the interruption of their silk trade impossible, and neither Himyar nor Aksum saw value in attacking an adversary that was both stronger and far too distant. Caisus was also responsible for killing a relative of Sumyafa Ashwa's, making Aksumites unwilling to go into battle under him.

A third invasion was prompted by a rebellion of Aksumite soldiers between 532 and 535, led by the former slave and Aksumite commander Abreha, against Sumyafa Ashwa. Kaleb sent 3,000 soldiers to quell this rebellion, led by one of his relatives, but these soldiers joined Abreha's rebellion upon arrival and killed Kaleb's relative. Kaleb sent reinforcements in another attempt to end the rebellion, but his soldiers were defeated and forced to turn around. Following Kaleb's death, Abreha paid tribute to Aksum to reinforce Himyar's independence. The new Himyarite nation consisted of several thousand Aksumite emigrants, serving as one of the earliest examples of a large-scale movement of tropical Africans outside of the continent. Just a century later, Aksum's relationship to this southwestern part of the Arabian Peninsula would be pivotal to the introduction of Islam at Mecca and Yathrib (Medina), as evidenced by the naming of Bilal, an Ethiopian, as the first muezzin, and the flight of some of Muhammad's earliest followers from Mecca to Askum.

== Music and the African diaspora ==
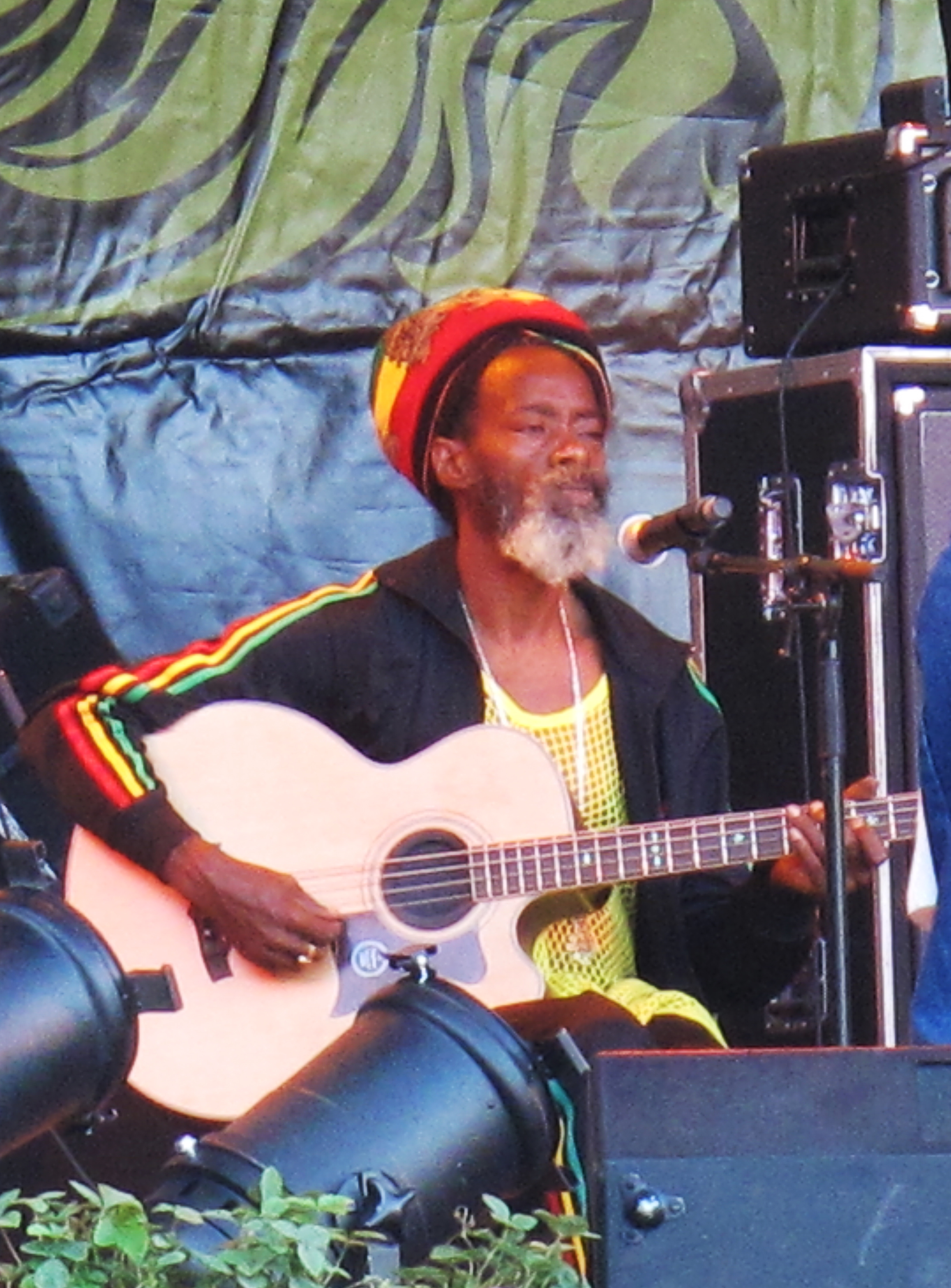
African-descended peoples have rich musical and dance traditions in the diaspora. Jamaica's Earl "Chinna" Smith is a reggae performer; the genre includes frequent references to Rastafari, pan-Africanism, and artwork with pan-African colors.

Although fragmented and separated by land and water, the African Diaspora maintains connection through the use of music. This link between the various sects of the African Diaspora is termed by Paul Gilroy as The Black Atlantic. The Black Atlantic is possible because black people have a shared history rooted in oppression that is displayed in Black genres such as rap and reggae. The linkages within the black diaspora formulated through music allows consumers of music and artists to pull from different cultures to combine and create a conglomerate of experiences that reaches across the world.

== See also ==
- African apologies for the Atlantic slave trade
- Africanisms
- African Australians
- African Diaspora Archaeology Newsletter
- African immigration to Europe
- Afro-Latin Americans
- African diaspora religions
- Black-brown unity
- Blaxit
- Emigration from Africa
- Genetic history of the African diaspora
- List of topics related to the African diaspora
