= Afro-Levantines =

Afro-Levantines, African Levantines, or Black Levantines may refer to:

- Afro-Jordanians
- Afro-Palestinians
- Afro-Syrians

== See also ==
- Afro-Arabs
