= Ribat of Sultan al-Mansur Qalawun =

- رباط السلطان المنصور قلاوون
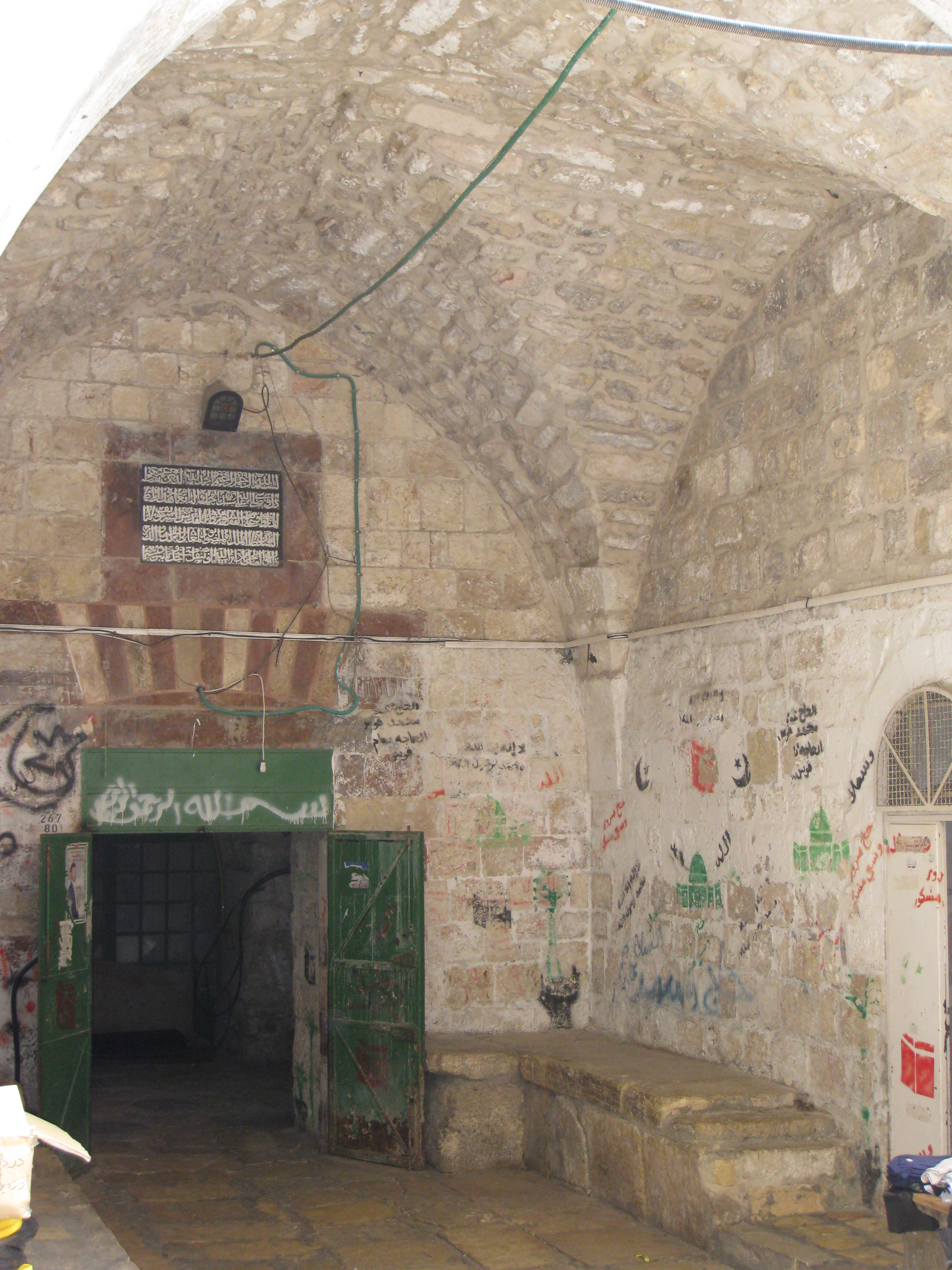
- Former names: Habs al-Ribat
- Alternative names: Al-Ribat al-Mansuri; Al-Mansuriyya

General information
- Type: Mamluk Ribat
- Architectural style: Egyptian Mamluk architecture
- Location: southern end of the eastern side of Bab al-Nazir Road, one of the gates of the Noble Sanctuary, Jerusalem, Jerusalem, Palestine; Israel

The Ribat of Sultan al-Mansur Qalawun (Egyptian Arabic: رباط السلطان المنصور قلاوون, Hebrew: ריבאט של הסולטן אלמנסור קלאוון), or simply al-Ribat al-Mansuri (الرباط المنصوري) or al-Mansuriyya. It is a ribat (refuge for the poor of Sufis) that was given by (Waqf) the Mamluk Sultan of Egypt Al-Mansur Qalawun to the poor and visitors of Jerusalem in the year 681 AH / 1282 AD, as can be seen from an inscription above the door of the ribat. Alaa al-Din Al-Basir supervised its construction. It is one of the few royal institutions built outside Al-Aqsa Mosque. A number of sheikhs supervised it.

== Description ==
The ribat consists of an open courtyard surrounded by a number of rooms and cells. A mosque has been attached to it. It is reached through an arched entrance leading to its doors, which have a cross-vaulted ceiling. The porch, in turn, leads to the open courtyard, rooms, cells, and the mosque. In the late Ottoman era and early 20th century, this ribat was transformed into a prison, and it was called Habs al-Ribat "Ribat Prison." Afro-Palestinians residents began to reside in the ribat due to its proximity to Al-Aqsa Mosque, where they took over guarding and caring for it and providing services to its visitors. Over time, the ribat became attached to the African community, which established a community association there. Then it was used in the late Ottoman era as a residence, and it remains so until now. Several families of Takarta Sudanese live there, as does Ribat al-Basir. A number of rooms have recently been added to it inside the open courtyard.

== Bibliography ==
- 'Adawi, Zubair (19 June 2014). "Jerusalem, al-Rabat al-Mansouri". Hadashot Arkheologiyot – Excavations and Surveys in Israel. 126. Israel Antiquities Authority.
- Al-Ju'beh, Nazmi; Hawari, M.; Natsheh, Yusuf (2013). Pilgrimage, Sciences and Sufism: Islamic Art in the West Bank and Gaza. Museum With No Frontiers, MWNF. ISBN 3902782110. (pp. 104–105)
- van Berchem, M. (1922). MIFAO 43 Matériaux pour un Corpus Inscriptionum Arabicarum Part 2 Syrie du Sud T.1 Jérusalem "Ville" (in French and Arabic). Cairo: Impr. de l'Institut français d'archéologie orientale.
- Burgoyne, Michael Hamilton (1987). Mamluk Jerusalem. ISBN 090503533X.
- Clermont-Ganneau, C.S. (1899). [ARP] Archaeological Researches in Palestine 1873-1874, translated from the French by J. McFarlane. Vol. 1. London: Palestine Exploration Fund. (127ff)
- D'Amato, C. [in Italian]; Catania, Domenico (2009). The Typologic Analysis of Mamluk Public Building in Al-Quds/Jerusalem: The Ribat and the Madrasa A Work in Progress. Istanbul. pp. 129−140. ISBN 978-92-9063-190-3.
- ed-dyn, Moudjir (1876). Sauvaire (ed.). Histoire de Jérusalem et d'Hébron depuis Abraham jusqu'à la fin du XVe siècle de J.-C.: fragments de la Chronique de Moudjir-ed-dyn. (Moudjir ed-dyn, 1876, pp. 223, 241, 242)
- Hütteroth, W.-D.; Abdulfattah, K. (1977). Historical Geography of Palestine, Transjordan and Southern Syria in the Late 16th Century. Erlanger Geographische Arbeiten, Sonderband 5. Erlangen, Germany: Vorstand der Fränkischen Geographischen Gesellschaft. ISBN 3-920405-41-2.
- Jaussen, J.A. [in French] (1925). "Inscriptions arabes de la ville d'Hébron [avec 7 planches]". BIFAO. 25: 1–45. (pp. 25-26)
- Tchekhanovets, Yana (1 March 2020). "Jerusalem, the Old City, al-Rabat al-Mansouri". Hadashot Arkheologiyot – Excavations and Surveys in Israel. 132. Israel Antiquities Authority.
- Toledano, E. (1984). "The Sanjaq of Jerusalem in the Sixteenth Century: Aspects of Topography and Population". Archivum Ottomanicum. 9: 279–319.
