= Slavery in Jordan =

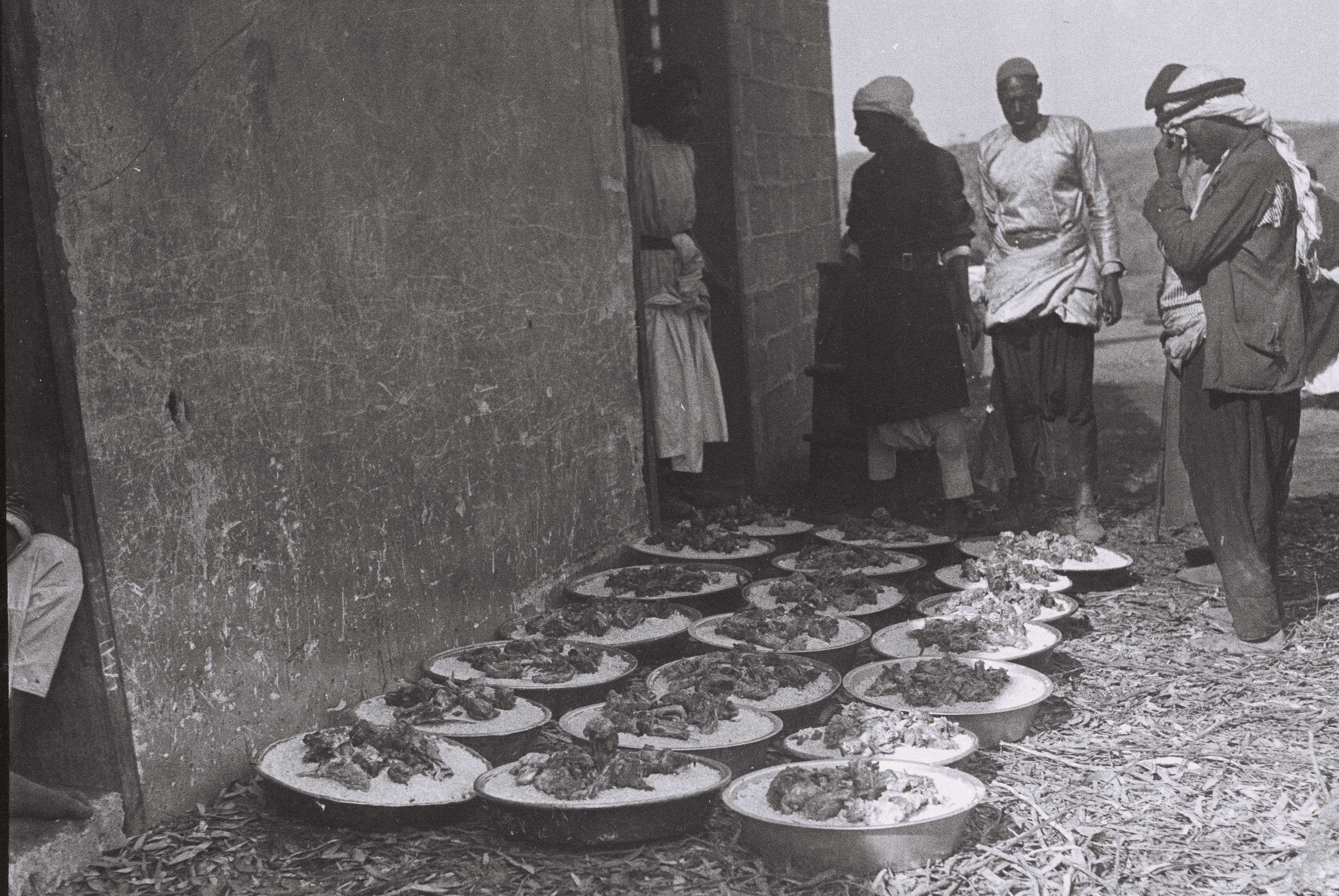
Servants waiting to serve bowls of rice and roast lamb to guests attending an Arab farmer's wedding in the Negev.

Slavery in Jordan is illegal, however, like many other countries, it suffers from issues relating to human trafficking. Historically, slavery in the territory later to become the modern state of Jordan, was significant during the Ottoman Empire period.

The area was one of the destinations of the Red Sea slave trade of enslaved Africans until the 20th century. Slavery was banned in the Emirate of Transjordan in 1929, but it was still reported to exist in practice in the 1940s. Many members of the Afro-Jordan minority are descendants of former slaves.

== History ==
Historically, the institution of slavery in the region of the later Jordan was reflected in the institution of slavery in the Rashidun Caliphate (632–661) slavery in the Umayyad Caliphate (661–750), slavery in the Abbasid Caliphate (750–1258), slavery in the Mamluk Sultanate (1258–1517) and finally slavery in the Ottoman Empire (1517–1918).

Jordan was close to the Red Sea slave trade, which had been trafficking enslaved people from Eastern Africa across the Red Sea to Arabia since antiquity. White slaves where imported from the Black Sea region in the North East from first the Crimean slave trade and later from the Circassian slave trade.

The sugar plantations in the Southern Jordan valley cultivated during the Ayybid (1187–1260) and Mamluk (1250–1517) era are known to have used slave labor, but it is unknown which ethnicity the slaves had or how they arrived to Jordan. From 1500 onward, three slave routes for slaves to Jordan-Palestine are known: Somalis victims of the Red Sea slave trade bought with pilgrims on return from the Hajj; Abyssinians bought to Palestine-Jordan from Cyprus and Istanbul; and slaves purchased in the slave markets of Egypt.

In accordance with Islamic tradition, female slaves were used as domestic servants or concubines (sex slaves), and male slaves, in addition to hard labor, were also used as pages, bodyguards and poets to the Bedouin tribal leaders during the 19th- and 20th centuries.

Jordan belonged to the Ottoman Empire in 1517–1921. Slavery was a significant part of the Ottoman Empire's economy. During the late 19th century, the Ottoman Empire officially conducted efforts to restrain the slave trade in the provinces of the Empire. Among the reforms representing the process of official abolition of slavery in the Ottoman Empire where the Prohibition of the Circassian and Georgian slave trade (1854–1855), the Prohibition of the Black Slave Trade (1857), and the Anglo-Ottoman Convention of 1880, followed by the Kanunname of 1889 and the excluding of slavery from the Constitution of 1908. However, in practice, these efforts were largely nominal and had no actual effect in Jordan.

=== Abolition ===
In 1921, former Ottoman Jordan was transformed into the Emirate of Transjordan (1921–1946), which was a British protectorate. The British Empire, having signed the 1926 Slavery Convention as a member of the League of Nations, was obliged to investigate, report and fight slavery and slave trade in all land under direct or indirect control of the British Empire. Slavery in Transjordan was legally abolished by the British in 1929. The British ban against slavery was incorporated into the constitution, and after 1929, there were officially no slavery in Jordan.

In 1934 however, a report to the Advisory Committee of Experts on Slavery of the League of Nations noted that slaves were still kept among the Bedouin shaykhs in Jordan and Palestine, and that slavery was maintained under the guise of clientage.

While formally banned on paper, slavery was reported to still exist in practice in Jordan as late as the 1940s.

Many members of the Afro-Jordan minority are descendants of former slaves.

== Modern slavery in Jordan ==
Jordan is a source, destination, and transit country for adults and children subjected to forced labor and, to a lesser extent, sex trafficking. Women from Southeast Asia and East Africa voluntarily migrate to Jordan for employment among the estimated 50,000 foreign domestic workers in the country; some domestic workers are subjected to forced labor. Many of these workers cannot return to their home countries due to pending criminal charges against them or their inability to pay overstay penalties or plane fare home.

== See also ==
- History of slavery in the Muslim world
- Human rights in Jordan
