= Afro-Omanis =

Omani people of African Zanj heritage

Total population
- 100,000 (2007): Approximately 5% of Omanis

Regions with significant populations
- Dhofar, Sur, Muscat

Languages
- Arabic, Swahili

Religion
- Islam

Related ethnic groups
- Omanis, Afro-Saudis, Al-Akhdam, Afro-Palestinians, Afro-Jordanians, Afro-Iraqis, Afro-Syrians

Afro-Omanis are Arab-Omani who settled in East Africa during the Omani Empire and later returned to Oman with some of African Zanj Mixture. Most live in the coastal cities of Oman, with many speaking Arabic and adhering to Islam. Some origins date back to the time of the Arab slave trade and era Slavery in Oman, and when Zanzibar was a part of the Omani Empire.

== History ==
Many Afro-Omanis are descendants of slaves, mainly trafficked via the Indian Ocean slave trade and the Zanzibar slave trade from the Swahili coast. On 23 July 1970, the Sultan of Oman Said bin Taimur was deposed in the 1970 Omani coup d'état and his successor Qaboos bin Said initiated a number of reforms, of which the abolition of slavery in Oman was one.

== Heritage ==
Some Afro-Omanis are still able to maintain rituals related to healing that are of Zanj origin. The languages used in these rituals are Swahili and Arabic.

== Demographics ==
In the year 2007, roughly 100,000 Omanis out of 2 million Omani citizens were descended from Swahili Omani Afro-Arabs. This means that roughly five percent of Omanis are Swahili Afro-Omanis. These Omanis are called "back-from-Africa" Omanis due to the fact that Sultan Qaboos called on diaspora nationals, to return to their home country after having lived abroad.

== Notable people ==
- Ali Al-Habsi, footballer
- Tippu Tip, slave trader

== See also ==
- Slavery in Oman
