= Black Taste, Black Odour =

Book by Ali al-Muqri

- Author: Ali al-Muqri
- Original title: طعم أسود ... رائحة سوداء
- Language: Arabic
- Genre: Novel
- Publisher: Dar al-Saqi
- Publication date: 2008
- Publication place: Yemen

Black Taste, Black Odour is a novel by Yemeni novelist Ali al-Muqri. Published in 2008 by Dar al-Saqi, it was longlisted for the International Prize for Arabic Fiction.

The book's plot revolves around Yemen's marginalized black community, known as "al-Muhamashīn." It is set in and around Taiz, home to many members of this community. As with many of al-Muqri's works, Black Taste, Black Odour sparked controversy for its frank depictions of sex.

It is regarded as one of the first Yemeni books to focus on al-Muhamashin.
