= 'Ala ad-Din al-Basir =

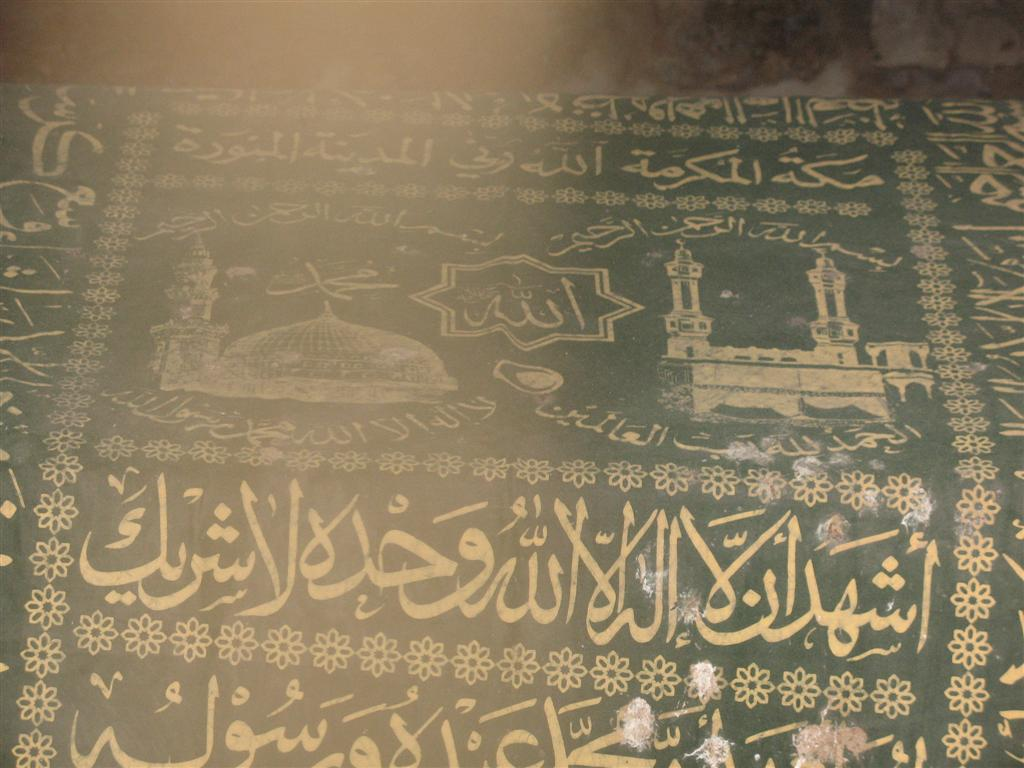
ʿAlāʼ ad-Dīn al-Baṣīr's grave

ʿAlāʼ ad-Dīn al-Baṣīr (see names below, died 1294) was a mamluk who became an emir. He was a supervisor of Jerusalem's waqf charitable endowments (nāẓir al-awqāf)

and inspector of the Two Noble Sanctuaries (nāẓir al-Ḥaramayn ash-Sharīfayn) of Jerusalem and Hebron.

He lived during the final years of the Ayyūbid dynasty (under aṣ-Ṣāliḥ) and the beginning of the Mamlūk dynasty (under Baybars and Qalāwūn).

== Names ==
- ʿAlāʼ ad-Dīn al-Baṣīr (علاء الدين البصير): al-Baṣīr is a nickname that means "astute, insightful" (بصير). The nickname also becomes al-Baṣīrī (البصيري) and al-Būṣayrī/al-Būṣairī (البوصيري) in placenames.
- ʿAlāʼ ad-Dīn Aydughdī ibn ʿAbdallāh aṣ-Ṣaliḥī an-Najmī (علاء الدين ايدغدى بن عبد الله الصالحي النجمي): aṣ-Ṣaliḥī an-Najmī is a nisba (noun + -ī), meaning he was a mamluk of aṣ-Ṣāliḥ Najm ad-Dīn, an Ayyūbid emir.
- ʿAlāʼ ad-Dīn Aydughdī ar-Ruknī (علاء الدين ايدغدى الركنى): ar-Ruknī may refer to Baybars (Rukn ad-Dīn), a Mamlūk sultan whom he served.

He is not to be confused with ʿAlāʼ ad-Dīn Aydughdī ibn ʿAbdallāh al-Kubakī (al-Kabakī), buried in the Kubakiyya mausoleum in the Mamilla Cemetery.

== Legacy ==
He was responsible for a number of building projects in Jerusalem. Some places in the city bear his name.

- Aladdin Ribat (ʿAlāʼ ad-Dīn al-Baṣīr Ribat) / al-Baṣīrī Mosque, a ribat outside the Inspector's Gate. During its construction, he used his cane as a yardstick and found a measurement mistake that sighted people overlooked. It includes his tomb/shrine and homes to a community of Afro-Palestinians.
  - Inspector's Gate (ʿAlāʼ ad-Dīn al-Baṣīr Gate) was named after the ribat.
  - Aladdin Street: named after the ribat.
- al-Būṣayrī Sabil (al-Baṣīr Sabil), a sebil (fountain) named after him.
- Ablution Gate and the Ablution Place west (outside) of the gate: restored by him.

He also built structures in Hebron:

- A bathhouse: He drew up its plan while he was blind.
- A storage installation (maghāliq) for wheat and barley.
