= Afro-Yemenis =

Afro-Yemenis or Black Yemenis comprise several ethnic groups of Yemen with African ancestry:

- Akhdam, an ethnic or socio-economic group whose origins can be traced to the East African slave trade
- Somalis in Yemen, a Somali-speaking ethnic group
