= African Diaspora Archaeology Newsletter =

Scholarly newsletter

- Discipline: African studies, Archaeology
- Language: English
- Edited by: Whitney Battle-Baptiste, Kelley Deetz, and Christopher Barton

Publication details
- History: 1994–present
- Publisher: African Diaspora Archaeology Network (United States)
- Frequency: Quarterly

Standard abbreviations
- ISO 4: Afr. Diaspora Archaeol. Newsl.

Indexing
- ISSN: 1933-8651

Links
- Journal homepage

The African Diaspora Archaeology Newsletter is a quarterly scholarly newsletter that covers the subject of the African diaspora as well as related archaeological and historical studies.

== History ==
The journal was founded as the African-American Archaeology Newsletter in 1990 by Theresa Singleton, who edited and published the African-American Archaeology Newsletter (AAAN) from 1990 through 1993. It was then edited by Thomas Wheaton from 1993 through 1996 and by John McCarthy from 1996 through 2000. In 2005, the newsletter's name was changed to the current title "African Diaspora Archaeology Newsletter"(ADAN).
