= Inspector's Gate =

Gateway to Al-Aqsa, Jerusalem

Coordinates: 31.77912°N 35.23397°E

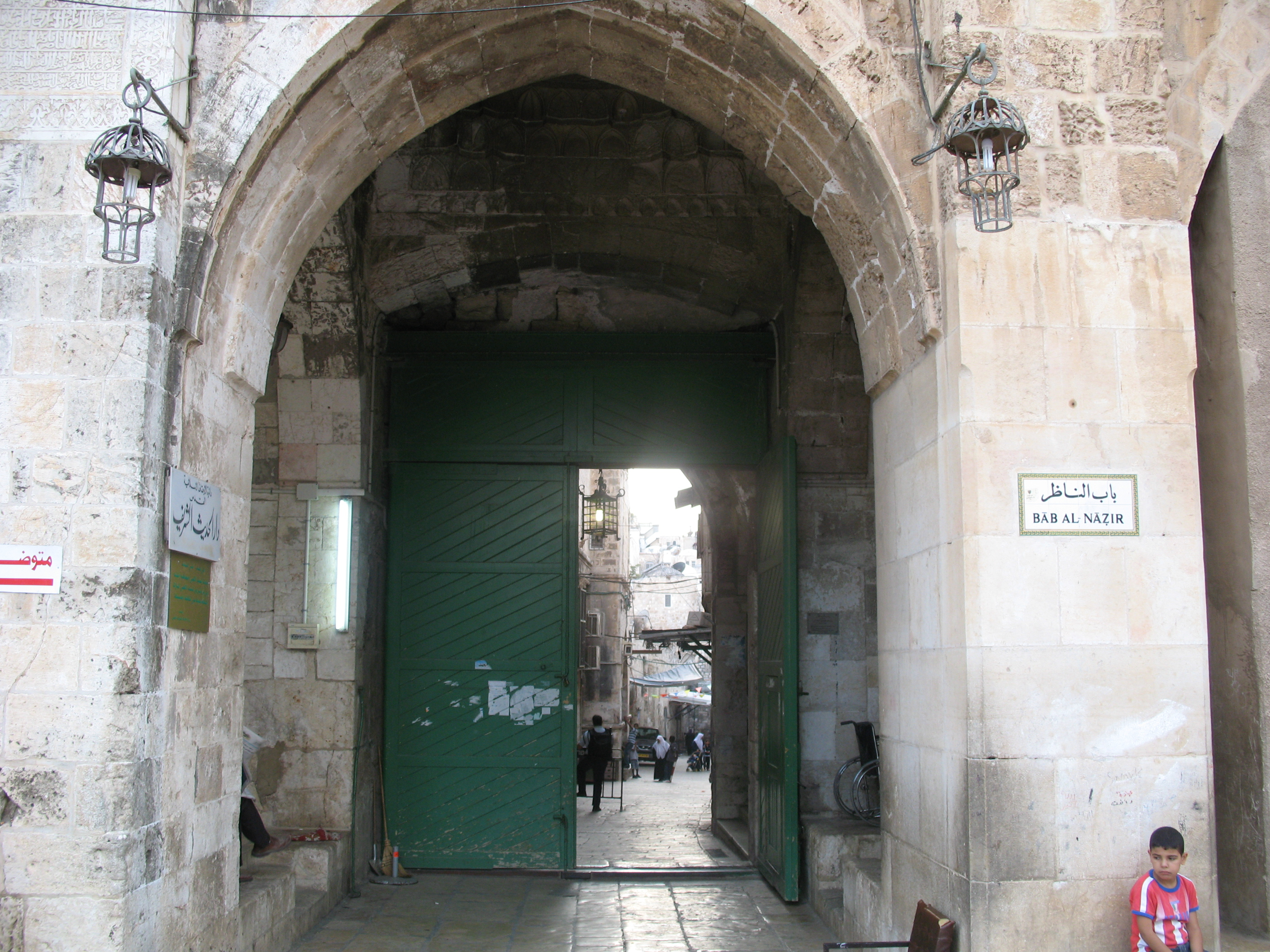
The gate from inside the compound

The Inspector's Gate (or the Council Gate, see below) is one of the gates of the al-Aqsa Compound (al-Ḥaram ash-Sharīf). It is the second-northernmost gates in the compound's west wall, after the Bani Ghanim Gate. It is north of the Iron Gate.

== Names ==
It has two current Arabic names, both are in use:

- the Inspector's Gate or Superintendent's Gate (باب الناظر Bāb an-Nāẓir (Note: Bāb an-Nāẓir is also Bāb an-Nādhir (also spelt Nathir) because of the letter ẓāʾ's variability. The article an- is also written al- if disregarding the solar letter n’s assimilation.)): named after the Inspector of the Two Noble Sanctuaries, the Nāẓir al-Ḥaramayn ash-Sharīfayn [of Jerusalem and Hebron] – not to be confused with the Servant of the Two Noble Sanctuaries [of Mecca and Medina]. It was also translated, less precisely, as "Gate of the Watchman".
- the Council Gate (باب المجلس Bāb al-Majlis): named after the Supreme Muslim Council.

Its obsolete names:

- Michael's Gate (باب میکائیل Bāb Mīkāʾīl or باب ميخائيل Bāb Mīkhāʾīl): named after Michael the archangel.
- the Gate of ʿAlāʾ ad-Dīn al-Baṣīr: (Note: Variations: Bāb ʿAlāʾ ad-Dīn al-Baṣīr (باب علاء الدين البصير), Bāb ʿAlāʾ ad-Dīn al-Baṣīrī (باب علاء الدين البصيري), and; Bāb ʿAlāʾ ad-Dīn al-Būṣayrī/al-Būṣairī (باب علاء الدين البوصيري).) named after a nearby ribat: the Aladdin Ribat, which in turn was named after Emir ʿAlāʾ ad-Dīn al-Baṣīr.
- the Prison Gate (باب الحبس Bāb al-Ḥabs), when the ribat was converted into a prison.

== History ==
It was probably built on the same spot as the Umayyad-period Gate of al-Walīd. It was rebuilt in 1203, during the Ayyubid era. The gate was expanded in the Mamluk period, especially from the eastern side, during the time of Sultan al-Nasir Muhammad bin Qalawun.

== Description ==
The gate consists of a high and wide entrance, held with a pointed stone knot, with two wooden supports supported by it, topped on the western side by a written copper strip. On the eastern side of the entrance, there is a square shape inside the hallway of the mosque, with open sides covered with a shallow dome, with three rows of muqarnas.

== Environs ==
The southwestern part of the Muslim Quarter is west (outside) of the gate. The immediate neighborhood is home to a community of Afro-Palestinians. Aladdin Street (Bāb an-Nāẓir Street) leads towards the gate.

In the compound's western wall, the gate is between al-Manjakiyya Madrasa (to its north) and the al-Wafā’iyya Zawiya (to its south). In front of each school, there is a sebil. In front of al-Manjakiyya is the Ibrāhīm al-Rūmī Sebil, aka Sabīl al-Būṣairī or Sabīl Bāb an-Nāẓir. (Note, however, Sabīl Bāb an-Nāẓir also refers to the al-Ḥaram Sebil outside of the compound, on al-Wad Street.) In front of al-Wafā’iyya is the Mustafa Agha Sebil (al-Budayrī Sabil).
