= Afro-Palestinians =

Racial group

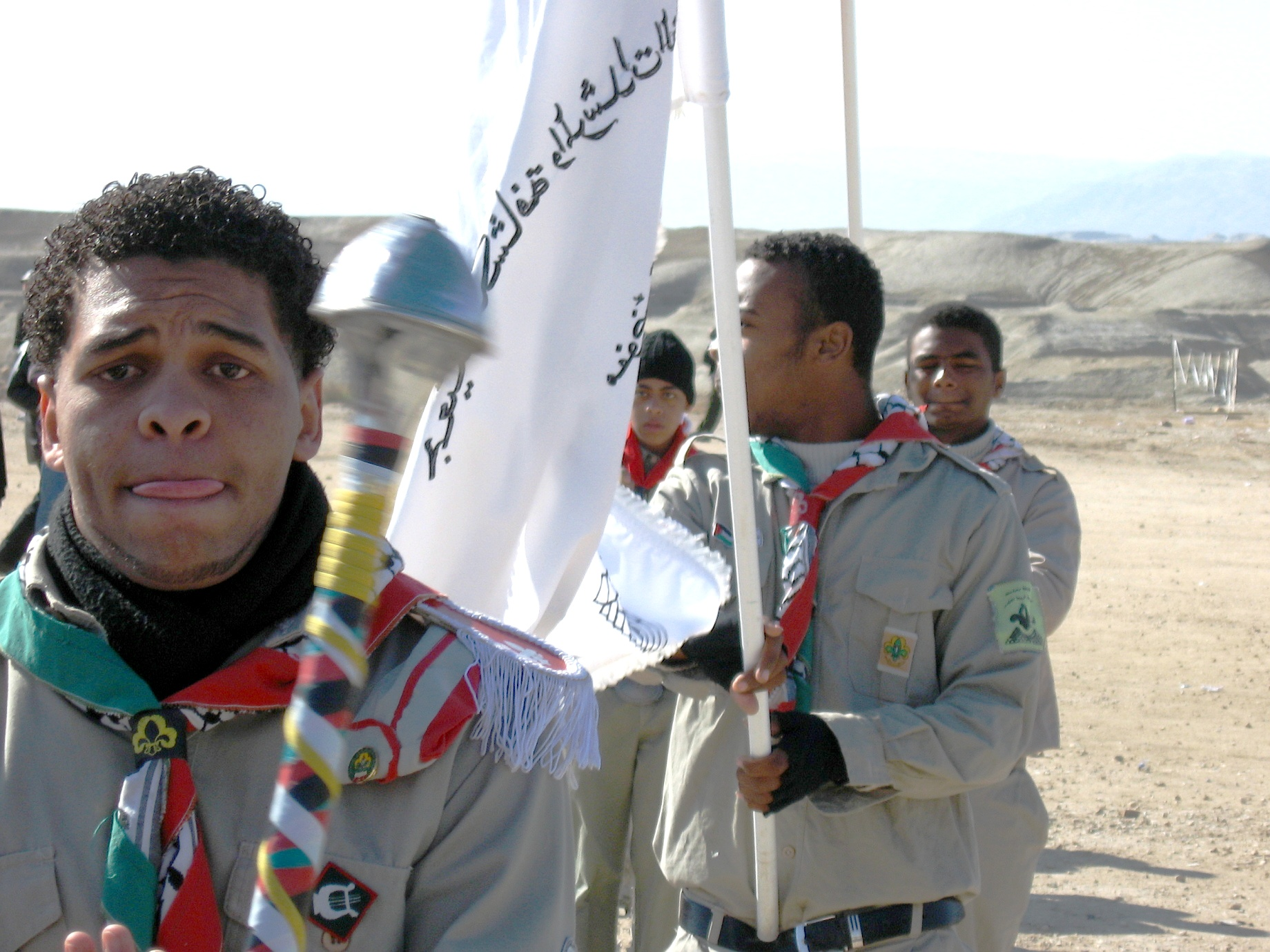
- Afro-Palestinian Christians in the West Bank, 2008

Regions with significant populations
- Palestine, Palestinian diaspora, Palestinians Arabs in Israel; Israel

Languages
- Majority: Arabic, Minority: Hausa language, Amharic, Hebrew

Religion
- Islam (majority), Christianity (minority)

Related ethnic groups
- Other Afro-Arabs, including: Afro-Jordanians, Afro-Syrians, Afro-Saudis, Akhdam, Afro-Omanis, Afro-Iraqis

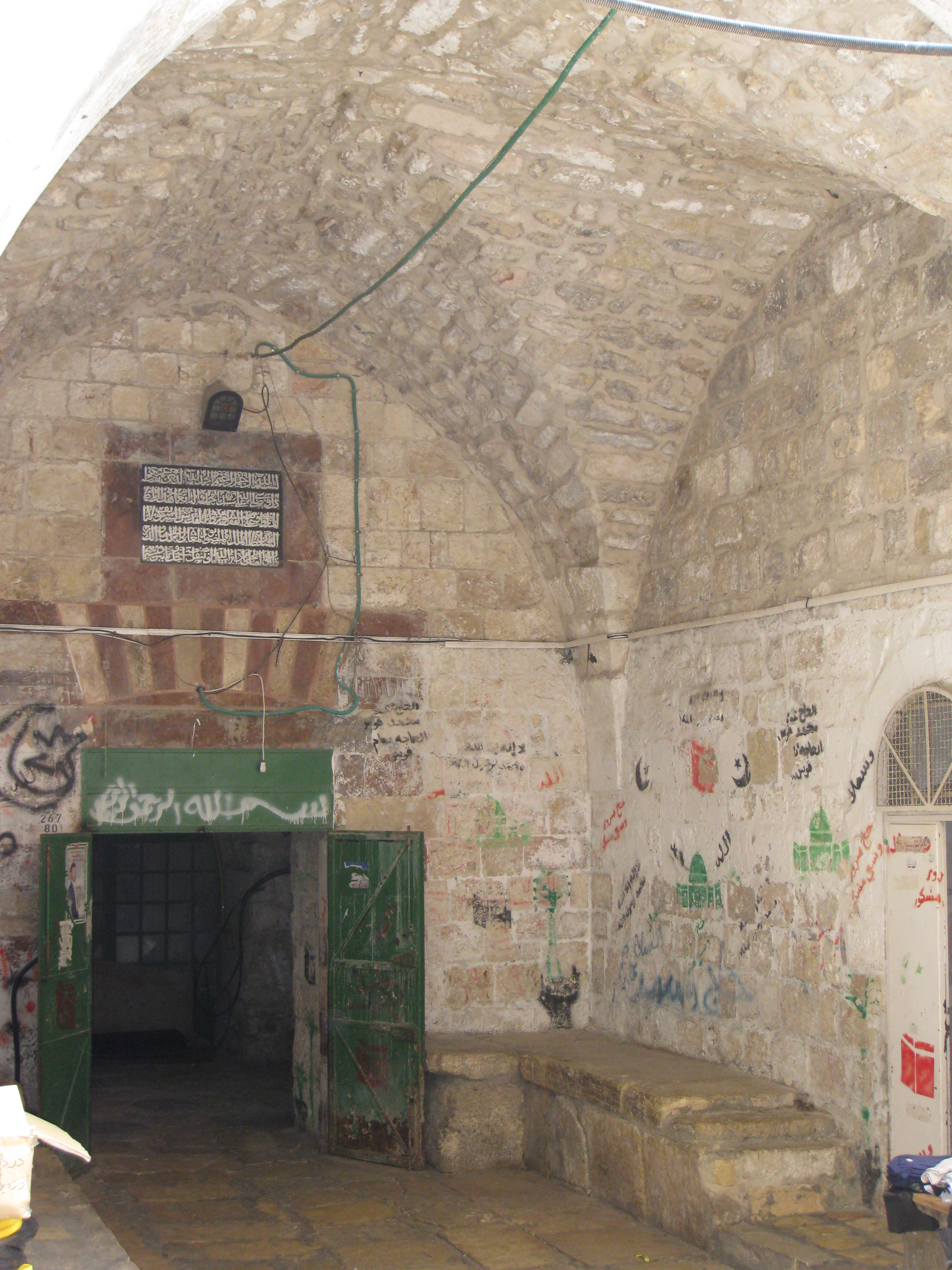
Ribat of Sultan al-Mansur Qalawun's African Centre, the Old Town, East Jerusalem.

Afro-Palestinians or Black Palestinians are Palestinians who descend from the Black racial groups of Africa. In the Gaza Strip, around 1% of the population is estimated to be black, with roughly 11,000 Afro-Palestinians residing in Gaza City's Al Jalla’a district, prior to October 2023. In Jerusalem, an estimated population between 200-450 reside in a historic African enclave around Bab al-Majlis, in the Muslim Quarter, as well as communities in other areas of Jerusalem, such as Beit Hanina and At-Tur.

They are a marginalised group that experience double discrimination, both systemic marginalization from Israeli authorities and racism within Palestinian communities.

Notable Afro-Palestinians include former PLO official Fatima Bernawi and PFLP official Ali Jiddah.

== History ==
=== Background ===
Historically Palestine was a province under foreign powers. From the Rashidun Caliphate of the 7th-century onward, African slaves were transported to the area of the Caliphate from Egypt via the Baqt treaty slave tribute. During the middle ages, African slaves were transported to Abbasid Caliphate via the Red Sea slave trade from Africa across the Red Sea. By the 9th century, it is estimated that some three million Africans had been resettled as enslaved people in the Middle East, working as slave soldiers and slave labourers in the riverine plantation economies.

There are some Palestinian communities that trace their origins to pilgrims from Sudan and Central Africa (mainly Chad) who are said to have reached Palestine as early as the 12th century. Their initial aim was to take part in the Hajj and reach Mecca, after which they visited Jerusalem to visit the al-Aqsa Mosque. As is illustrated by the life of Mansa Musa, king of the Empire of Mali, pilgrimage by African converts to Islam became an established practice, though regular pilgrimage only became commonplace in the 15th century, as the Islamic faith spread beyond the narrow confines of sultanate courts to the people at large.

Many Afro-Palestinians also hail from ancestors who were brought to Palestine by the Ottoman enslavers via the Trans-Saharan slave trade from Egypt as well as the Red Sea slave trade, that continued up until modern times. The last official slave ship of enslaved Africans arrived to Haifa in Palestine from Egypt in 1876, after which the official slave trade to Ottoman Palestine appeared to have stopped. Slavery in Palestine gradually diminished in the early 20th-century, and in the 1905 census for Palestine only eight individuals were officially registered as slaves; however a report to the Advisory Committee of Experts on Slavery of the League of Nations in 1934 acknowledged that slaves were still kept among the Arab Bedouin shaykhs in Jordan and Palestine, and that slavery was maintained under the guise of clientage.

The Jerusalem community of Afro-Palestinians, 50 families now numbering some 350 (or 450) members, reside in two compounds outside the Ḥaram ash-Sharīf (west of the Inspector's Gate): Ribat al-Mansuri and Ribat of Aladdin (Ribat al-Basiri/Ribat Aladdin al-Bassir/Ribat Al'a ad-Deen Busari). They were built between 1267 and 1382 and served as ribats (hostels for visiting Muslim pilgrims) under the Mamluks. This distinctive enclave has been called Jerusalem's Little Harlem. During the Arab Revolt of World War I, the Ottomans converted the compounds into jails — one known as 'the Blood Prison' and the other as 'the hanging prison' — where prisoners were detained and executed. The community has restructured part of this former prison to create a mosque. Until the Israeli occupation that began in 1967, they were employed as guards at the Ḥaram ash-Sharīf, a function now taken over by Israeli soldiers.

These have close links with similar communities in Acre and Jericho, established during the era of slavery in the Umayyad Caliphate, when African slaves came to work in the Umayyad sugar industry. The community in northern Jericho have often been called "the slaves of Duyuk" even in modern times.

People whose ancestors came from Nigeria, Sudan, Senegal and Chad make up most of the community, and most of these came to Palestine during the British Mandate. Many, according to Abraham Milligram, came as conscripted labourers during General Edmund Allenby's campaign against the Turks in the latter stages of World War I. Another group trace their lineage to the Arab Salvation Army who fought on the Arab side of the 1948 Arab–Israeli War.

=== Modern times ===
Following Ottoman rule, the ribats became a part of the religious trust (waqf). The Palestinian leader and mufti of Jerusalem Sheikh Amin al-Husseini rented out these compounds to Palestinians of African background, in gratitude for their loyalty as protectors of the al-Aqsa Mosque after one of the African guards, Jibril Tahruri, took a bullet aimed at the mufti. The rent remains largely nominal. Afro-Palestinians whose connection to Jerusalem predates 1947 found themselves in one of the most troubled areas in the region. Falling in love with the city of Jerusalem and with deep ties to Islam, they married Palestinians and continue to identify as Palestinians.

The African Palestinians who now live in the two compounds near al-Aqsa mosque have called the area home since 1930. They have experienced prejudice, with some Palestinian Arabs referring to them as "slaves" (abeed) and to their neighbourhood as the "slaves' prison" (habs al-abeed). In colloquial Palestinian Arabic, standard usage prefers the word sumr (dark colour) over sawd, which has an uncouth connotation. In a 1997 interview, community members described their origins as "Sudan" as a reference to the Arabic phrase for "place of the Black people." In recent decades, "African community" (al-jaliyya al-Afriqiyya) has become more standard.

Ali Jiddah, a tour guide and also a former member of the PFLP, has stated that he personally never experienced prejudice over his skin colour from Palestinian Arabs, claiming Afro-Palestinians enjoy a special status for their contributions to the Palestinian struggle. Fatima Barnawi, of mixed Nigerian-Palestinian descent, was the first Palestinian woman to be arrested on terrorism charges for attempting to bomb a movie theater in downtown Jerusalem in 1967. Although the bomb failed to explode, she was sentenced to 30 years in prison, ultimately serving only ten. Jiddah placed four grenades on Strauss Street in a 1968 attack in downtown Jerusalem, wounding nine Israeli civilians. His cousin Mahmoud likewise committed a similar attack. Both men served 17 years in prison before being released in a prisoner swap in 1985.

A 2018 story on Mohammad Obaid, a Dabke performer displaced from his ancestral home in Beersheba, described the racism he experienced in Gazan Palestinian communities, saying that he had to be "the best dancer" and work twice as hard to join his dabke team. Obaid noted increasing discrimination from police. At the time, there were an estimated 11,000 Afro-Palestinians living in Gaza City's Al Jalla’a district, in a neighborhood called “Al Abeed,” a reference to the history of slavery.

According to Jiddah, any racism by Palestinian Arabs could be blamed on ignorance, claiming that he had experienced similar prejudice from Israelis. "We Afro-Palestinians are dually oppressed, as Palestinians and because of our color the Israelis call us 'kushis.'" According to Mahmoud, Israeli police are the main perpetrators of racism against the community. In 2022, Mohammed Firawi was released from prison after five years for allegedly throwing stones at Israeli police. The community celebrated his return to the African Quarter, which was cited as cause for his subsequent re-arrest and week-long expulsion from Jerusalem.

Afro-Palestinians also experience bureaucratic obstacles in travel and identification cards. Qous (also spelled Qaws) is not an Israeli citizen, cannot apply for a Chadian passport without surrendering Jerusalem residency, and is also ineligible for French or Jordanian papers. In addition, checkpoints have increased around Bab al-Majlis and effectively seal off the neighborhood. As a result, the community experiences greater harassment from security and has also experienced significant economic loss without tourist traffic.

There are also Palestinian Bedouin populations who descend from Sub-Saharan Africans, such as in the West Bank city of Jericho.

== Sub-groups ==
=== Tukarina Palestinians ===
In the early 16th century, the buildings previously housing the defeated Mamluks were handed over by the Ottomans to the Tukarinas. Tukarinas were subdivided into the Tukarinas and Tukaris, the latter who were largely Christians or Muslims from Darfur, and the former, Muslim Hausas. The Tukarina and Takari Palestinians held two wards, namely the Alaal-Din ward and the Mansuri ward for administrative purposes in the vicinity of Jerusalem within the Ottoman empire. The officials for these African denizens were referred to as mukhtar, locally meaning chief; the last known of these was Alhaji Jadeh in the 1990s.

== Culture ==
The African Community Society (ACS) was established in 1983 as an off-shoot of the former Sudanese Welfare Club, which disbanded following Israeli annexation of East Jerusalem. ACS organizes social activities, sports, mutual aid, and other means to empower Afro-Palestinians in Jerusalem.

As more of the community moves to suburbs, connections are strengthening with Ethiopian Christians and Black Hebrews. There are almost little to no relations with Ethiopian Jews due to their service in the Israel Defense Forces.

After 1948, in particular, black Palestinian men married women coming from the peasant fellahin society, but never Bedouin women. According to Mousa Qous, director of the African Community Society and a former member of the PFLP, "Sometimes when a black Palestinian wants to marry a white Palestinian woman, some members of her family might object." Interracial marriage with Afro-Palestinians has become more common in recent years.

A census taken during the 1920s suggested that the most commonly spoken indigenous African language spoken by Afro-Palestinians during the Mandatory Palestine period were Sudanese and Abyssinian, appelations typically associated with either Sudanese Arabic or the Nubian languages considered collectively, and Amharic respectively.

== Notable ==
- Suleiman Obeid, Afro-Palestinian footballer
- Fatima Bernawi, Afro-Palestinian Fatah militant
- Sanna Abubkheet, Afro-Palestinian retired middle-distance runner
- Majed Abu Maraheel, Afro-Palestinian long-distance runner, football player, security officer and athletics coach
- Mohammed Abukhousa, Afro-Palestinian sprinter
- Ghadir Ghrouf, Afro-Palestinian track and field athlete
- Alhaji Jadeh, former mukhtar (chieftain) of Jerusalem's Islamic African quarter

== See also ==
- Jericho, with a substantial population of black Palestinians
- Black-Palestinian solidarity
