= Fatima Bernawi =

Palestinian militant (1939–2022)

- فاطمة برناوي
- Born: 1939; Jerusalem, Mandatory Palestine
- Died: 3 November 2022 (aged 83); Cairo, Egypt
- Resting place: Gaza City

Fatima Mohammed Bernawi (1939 – 3 November 2022) (also transliterated Barnawi; Arabic: فاطمة برناوي) was a Palestinian militant who was involved with Fatah in the mid-1960s, a significant period in the Israeli–Palestinian conflict. She was known for the attempted bombing of an Israeli movie theatre in October 1967.

== Background and early life ==
Bernawi was born in Jerusalem in 1939. In 1948 at the age of nine, during the Nakba, her mother who is Palestinian was displaced from Jerusalem to a refugee camp near Amman. However, they later returned to Palestine to her Nigerian father, who had fought in the 1936 Palestine revolt, and who had remained behind.

Bernawi worked as a practical nurse for the Arab-American Oil Company in Saudi Arabia (ARAMCO)

== Political life ==
Bernawi is widely considered the first female Palestinian militant. Of thirty-four Palestinian women whom Amal Kawar interviewed for her study Daughters of Palestine, Bernawi was one of only four who joined the resistance movement initially as a freedom fighter before becoming a political resistor. The others were Laila Khaled, Aisha Odeh, and Rasmiyeh Odeh.

=== Attempted bombing and arrest ===
In October 1967, Bernawi planted a bomb at the Zion Cinema in West Jerusalem. Bernawi said the bomb's civilian target was chosen in protest of a film that celebrated the Six Day War. The bomb failed to explode and she was arrested by Israeli soldiers. Bernawi claimed her skin colour was a factor in her arrest, saying, "Of course, they arrested all the young women from African origin."

Though sentenced to life in prison, Bernawi was released in a prisoner exchange in 1977 after having served 10 years. She was deported in 1979, but returned to the political party Fatah, later serving as the first female chief of the Palestinian Female Police Corps in Gaza.

In 1994, Bernawi returned to the Gaza Strip and assumed leadership of the women's police. By 1996, she was "the highest ranking female in Fateh militia and... head of the women's section of the police in the Palestinian self-rule government in the Gaza Strip and Jericho". Yasser Arafat, noted leader of Fateh and Chairman of the Palestine Liberation Organization (PLO), held her in high regard, once saying that "if he would marry anyone it would be [Fatima] Bernawi".

On 28 May 2015, Bernawi was honoured by Palestinian Authority Chairman Mahmoud Abbas with the Military Star of Honor "out of appreciation for her pioneering role in the struggle" and "for the public good." Though the bombing she was honoured for was a failure, Bernawi insisted it was successful, saying, "This is not a failure, because it generated fear throughout the world. Every woman who carries a bag needs to be checked before she enters the supermarket, any place, cinemas and pharmacies." Bernawi was also honoured alongside Mahmoud Bakr Hijazi and Ahmad Moussa Salama in honour of Palestinian Prisoner's Day, 17 April 2015. She was described as "one of the first Palestinian women to adopt [the means of] armed self-sacrifice operations after the start of the modern Palestinian revolution, which was launched by Fatah on 1 January 1965. She was the first young Palestinian woman to be arrested by the Israeli security forces, and is the first woman prisoner listed in the records of the [Palestinian] women prisoners' movement..."

== Personal life ==
She married a former prisoner from Acre, Fawzi al-Nimr, who was released in May 1985.

On 3 November 2022, Bernawi died at "Palestine hospital" in Cairo, aged 83, and was later buried in Gaza City on 6 November.
