= Afro-Jordanians =

Racial group

الأردنيون من أصل أفريقي (Arabic)

Total population
- ~6,000

Languages
- Arabic

Religion
- Islam

Related ethnic groups
- Afro-Palestinians, Afro-Syrians, Al-Akhdam, Afro-Iraqis, Afro-Saudis, Afro-Omanis

Afro-Jordanians or Black Jordanians are citizens of Jordan who have any ancestry from any of the Black racial groups of Africa. Afro-Jordanians speak Arabic and mostly adhere to Islam. Most Afro-Jordanians are concentrated in the Southwest parts of Jordan.

Many Afro-Jordanians are descendants of slaves, trafficked via the Red Sea slave trade. Historically, the institution of slavery in the region of the later Jordan was reflected in the institution of slavery in the Rashidun Caliphate (632–661) slavery in the Umayyad Caliphate (661–750), slavery in the Abbasid Caliphate (750–1258), slavery in the Mamluk Sultanate (1258–1517) and finally slavery in the Ottoman Empire (1517–1918).

In 1921, former Ottoman Jordan was transformed into the Emirate of Transjordan (1921–1946), which was a British protectorate. The British Empire, having signed the 1926 Slavery Convention as a member of the League of Nations, was obliged to investigate, report and fight slavery and slave trade in all land under direct or indirect control of the British Empire. Slavery in Transjordan was legally abolished by the British in 1929.

== See also ==
- Afro-Arab
- Slavery in Jordan
- Red Sea slave trade
