= Ali al-Muqri =

Yemeni novelist and writer

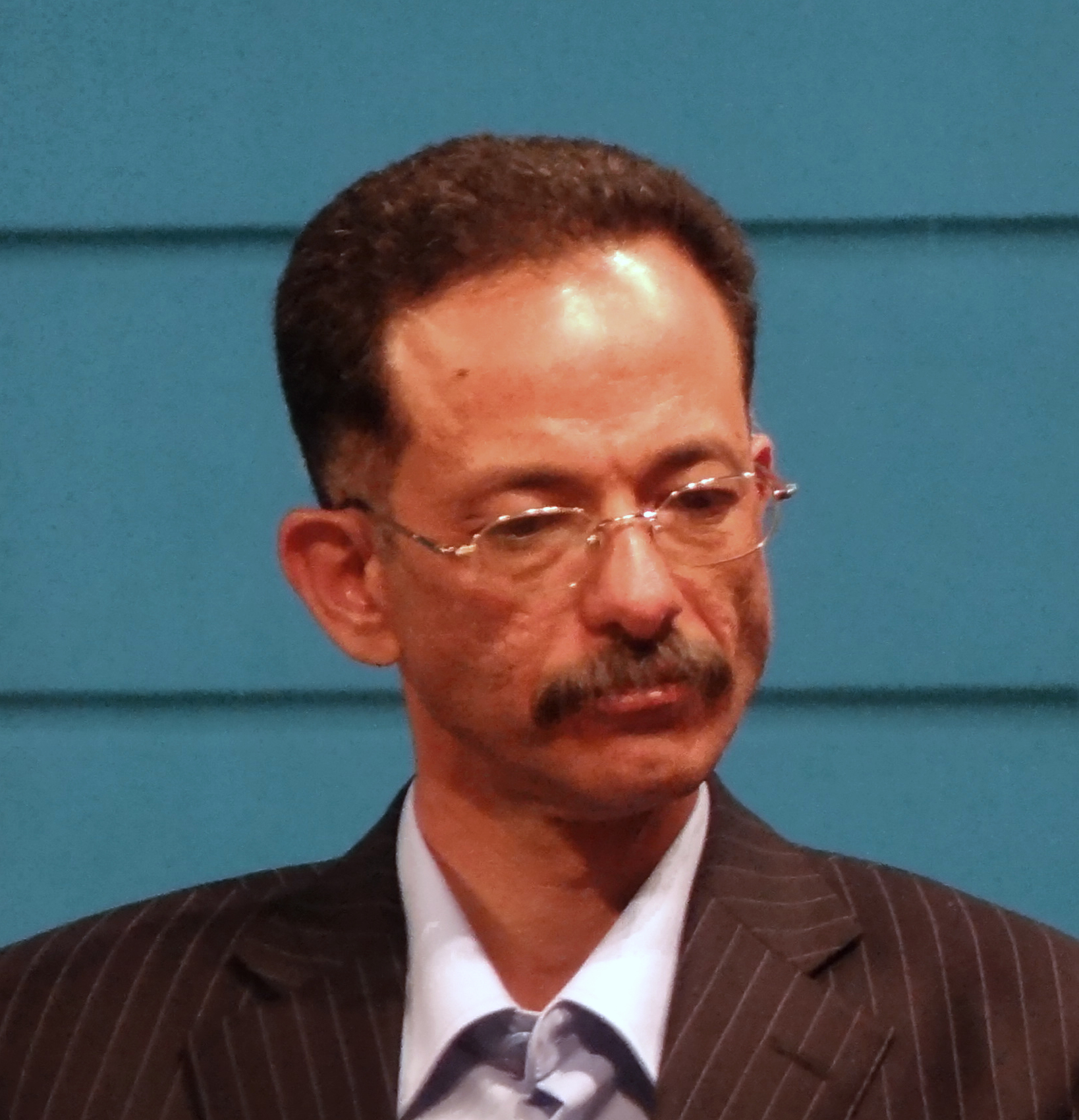
- Born: 1966 (age 59–60); Taiz, Yemen
- Writing career
- Language: Arabic, French
- Genre: Novel
- Notable works: Black Taste, Black Odor (2008) The Handsome Jew (2009)

Ali al-Muqri (Arabic: علي المقري) (born in Taiz) is a Yemeni novelist and writer. Two of his novels - Black Taste, Black Odour and The Handsome Jew (Note: This novel, which is considered by many to be the most important of all his works – as can be judged from a plethora of articles written about it and from the reactions received in the media and in Arabic literature – describes a seemingly impossible love between a young Jewish man and an older woman, the daughter of a Muslim religious scholar. The love story is presented while expressing criticism of both Jewish and Muslim society in Yemen, which groups are not ready to accept this pairing. The ideological basis of this book is individual freedom and equality between people of any religion or nation. It should also be noted that the book includes a description – albeit fictional, but full of compassion and sympathy – of the hardships encountered by Yemenite Jews on their way to exile in Mawza, a description that is not found in any source of Yemenite Jews telling of the Mawza Exile.) - have been long-listed for the Arab Booker Prize. He also received a special commendation from the jury of the 2015 French Prize for Arabic Literature, for his novel Ḥurma (Femme interdite), translated into French by Khaled Osman and Ola Mehanna.

Al-Muqri's work has been published in Banipal magazine, The New York Times, and in French newspaper La Libération. In 1997, he became editor-in-chief of Al-Ḥikmah, the journal of the Yemeni Writers Association. He later served as the editor of literary journal Ǧaymān. In 2015, he fled to Paris after receiving death threats for writing sexually charged books.

== List of publications ==
- Nāfiḏat lil-ğasad (A Window into the Body) (1987)
- Tarmīmāt (Restorations) (1999; 2000)
- Yaḥdat fī al-nasī'ān (It Comes with Forgetfulness) (2003)
- al-Khamr wa-al-nabīdh fī al-islām (Wine and Nabīd in Islam) (2007)
- Ṭaʿm aswad…Rā’iḥah sawdā’ (Black Taste, Black Odour) (2008)
- Al-Yahūdī al-Ḥālī (The Handsome Jew) (2009) - translated into French as Le Beau Juif (2011), and into Italian as Il Bell’Ebreo (2012)
- Ḥurmah (Woman) (2012) - translated into French as La Femme Interdite (2015), in English as Hurma (2015), and in Italian as Donna proibita (2021)
- Bukhūr 'Adanī (Adeni Incense) (2014)
