= Afro-Syrians =

Racial group

سوريون أفارقة

Total population
- Between 30,000 and 60,000

Regions with significant populations
- Daraa, Golan Heights, Damascus

Languages
- Arabic

Religion
- Islam (mostly Sunni; with a significant Shia minority)

Related ethnic groups
- Syrians, Sudanese Arabs, Afro-Jordanians, Afro-Palestinians, Afro-Iraqis, Afro-Saudis, Al-Akhdam, Afro-Omanis

Afro-Syrians are citizens of Syria who have any ancestry from any of the Black racial groups of Africa. There are at least four major groups of Black Syrians: The Yarmouk people, a group of Afro-Iraqi origin, the Shia group in Damascus, and the Sudanese-Syrians. The Black people of Yarmouk Basin are living in southwestern Daraa Governorate.

== History ==
There are many different origins of Afro-Syrians, the most common ones are the Arab slave trade, African Muslims settling in Syria during the Islamic Golden Age, African refugees that received Syrian citizenship, Syrian refugees in Africa who mixed with the local Africans, Syrian refugees in Brazil who mixed with Afro-Brazilians, and interracial marriages between Syrians and black people. Sudan is listed as the most common place of ancestry for Afro-Syrians, with Sudan and Syria having connections since the spread of Islam and the rapidly-growing number of Syrian refugees in Sudan and Sudanese refugees in Syria. Most Afro-Syrians fell under ISIS rule during the Syrian Civil War. A community of Shia Afro-Syrians exists in Damascus. A lot of Afro-Palestinians also reside in refugee camps in Syria.

Though their exact origin is unknown, some local stories report Sudan as ancestral homeland of the Yarmouk Basin's black people; in any case, they have lived in the area for a long time, and are culturally and linguistically assimilated into the local Arab population. While the number of black people in the basin is considered relatively large by locals, their existence is little known throughout wider Syria. In course of the Syrian Civil War, most of the black population of the Yarmouk Basin came under control of the Islamic State of Iraq and the Levant through first the Yarmouk Martyrs Brigade and then the Khalid ibn al-Walid Army.

== Population ==
=== Geographic distribution ===
While a few villages and towns in the Yarmouk Basin have larger black populations, smaller numbers of the ethnic group can be found throughout the whole area.

=== Known clans ===
- Bayt al-Sudi: (Note: Clans and extended families are normally termed as "bayt" (literally, "house") in the Yarmouk Basin.) The largest and best known Black clan of the region, which is centered in the small village of al-Sudi in the northern basin. The Bayt al-Sudi has also a presence in Jamla, Nawa and al-Sheikh Sa'ad (south of Nawa).
- Bayt Abu Samir: A smaller clan in Jamla.
- Bayt Abu Marah: Another clan in Jamla.
- A clan in the village of al-Shajra.
- Larger black populations of unknown tribal affiliation live in Jalin and Tasil.
- Bayt Al-Masri whose name means "Egyptian" in Arabic

== Social condition ==
The existence of Afro-Syrians is very little known in Daraa, and basically unknown in other parts of Syria. Afro-Syrians are highly concentrated in southwestern Daraa. They are the smallest Afro-Arab group. On top of war and occupation, Afro-Syrians experience severe racism and discrimination, including not being given any representation at all. Their population is unknown and has never been recorded.

== See also ==
- Arabs
- Afro-Arabs
- Afro-Palestinians
- Afro-Jordanians
- Afro-Saudis
- Afro-Iraqis
