= Akhdam =

Untouchable caste in Yemen

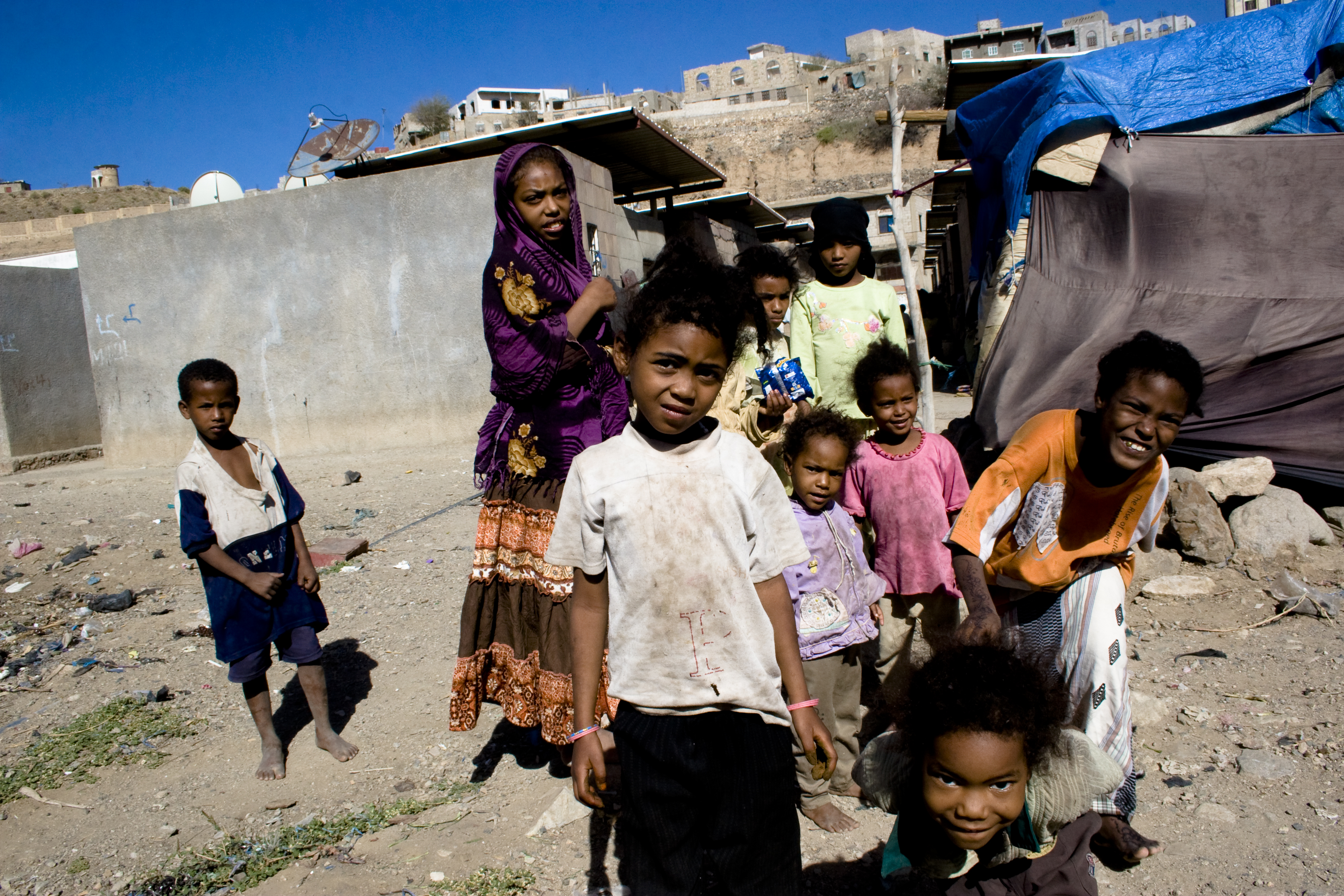
- Akhdam children in a Taiz neighborhood

Total population
- 500,000 - 2,500,000 (Unofficial sources)

Regions with significant populations
- Sana'a, Aden, Ibb, Ta'izz, Lahij, Abyan, Al Hudaydah, Mukalla

Languages
- Yemeni Arabic

Religion
- Islam

Related ethnic groups
- Afro-Arabs, Ethiopians, Bantus, Nilotes, and Yemeni Arabs

The Akhdām (Arabic: الأخدام, romanized: Al-Akhdām, lit. 'the servants'; singular: Khadami), are an Arabic-speaking ethnic or socio-economic group whose members live in Yemen. Although the Muhamashīn are Arabic-speaking Muslims just like most other Yemenis, they are considered to be at the very bottom of the supposedly abolished caste ladder, they are socially segregated from other Yemenis and they are mostly confined to menial jobs in the country's major cities. According to unofficial estimates, the Muhamashīn number is between 500,000 and 2,500,000 individuals.

== Origins ==
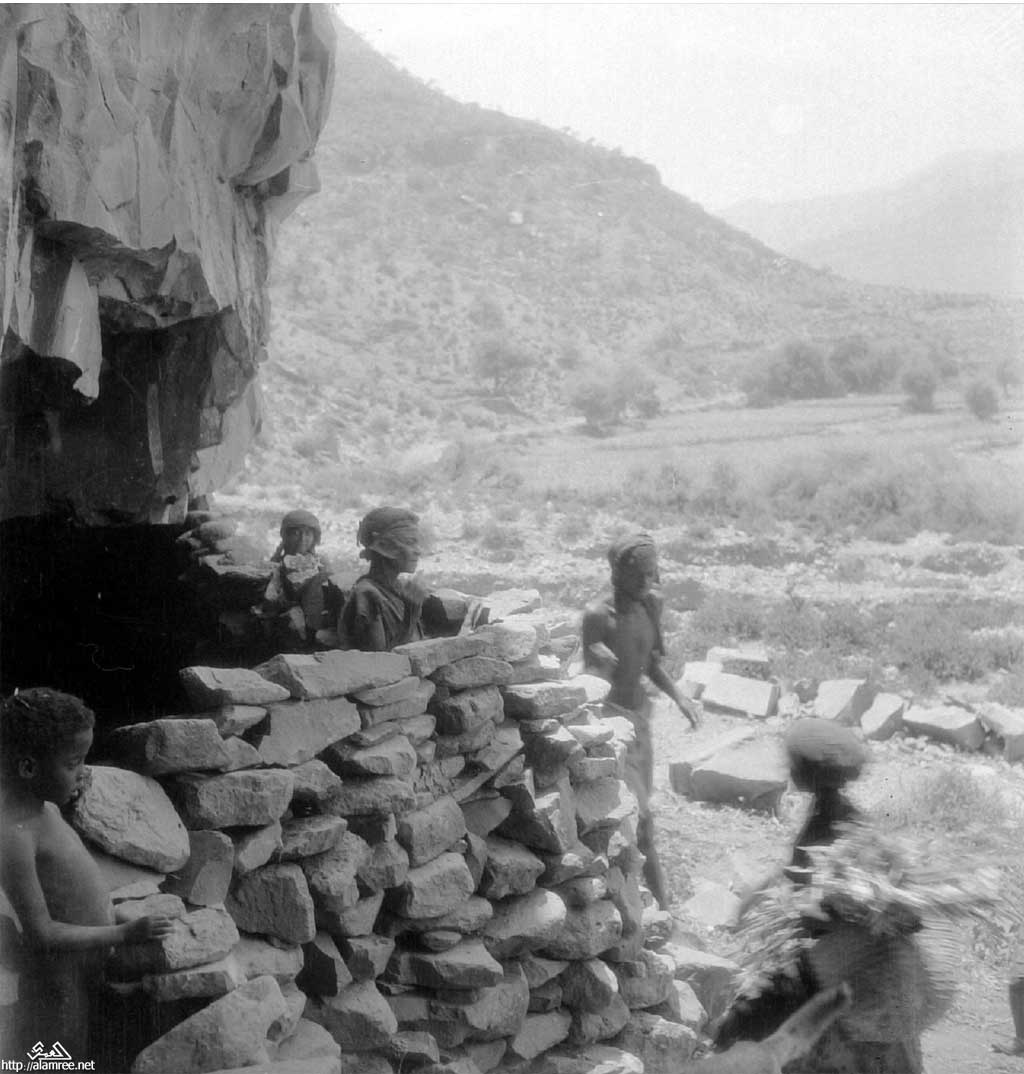
The caves of Al-Akhdam in Sanaa in 1942

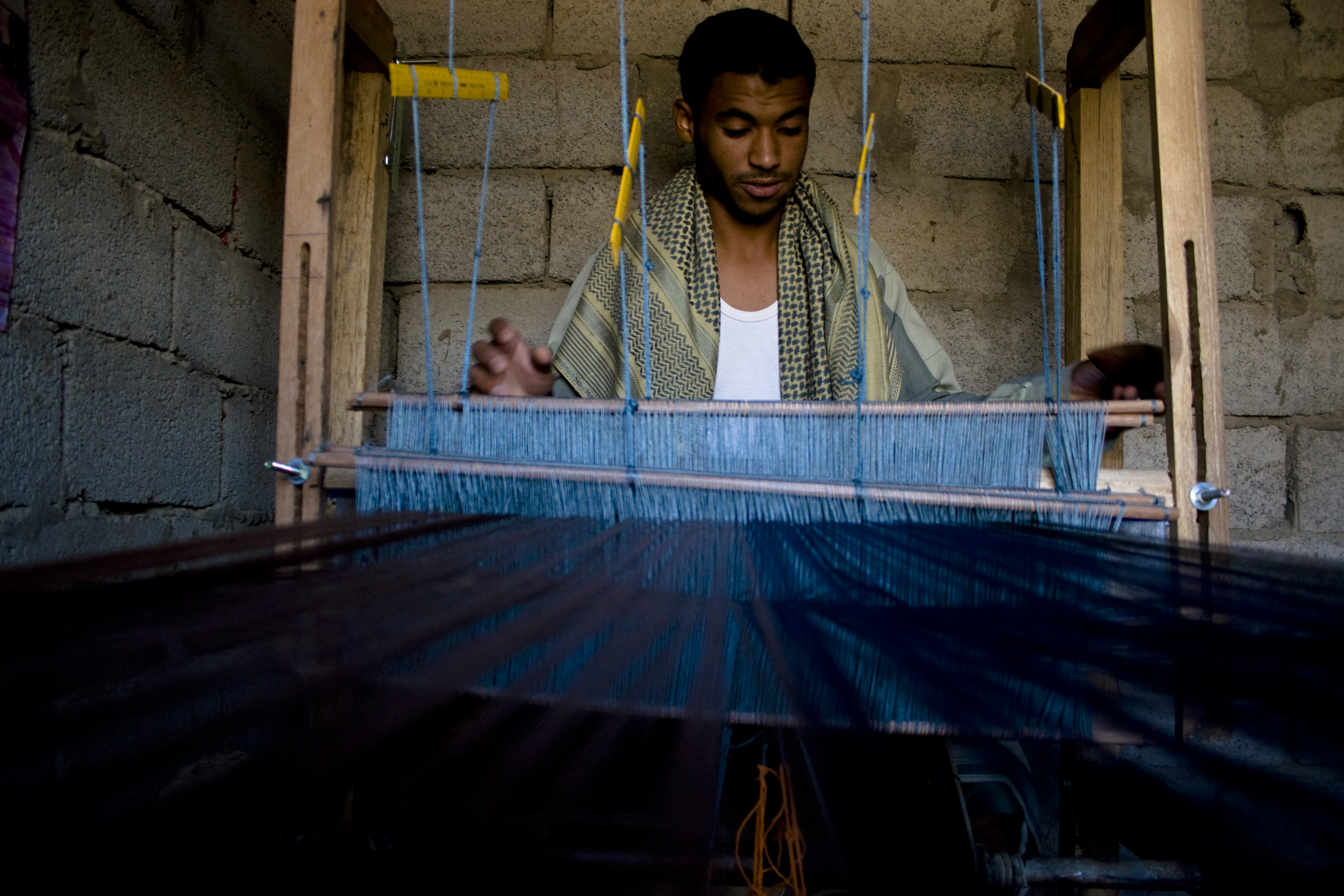
Akhdam man or Khadem in Ta'izz

According to local sources, the Akhdam are descendents of an Ethiopian army that invaded Yemen in pre-Islamic times. Today, however, this is generally regarded as a myth, with theories tracking the Akhdam's origins back to Tanzanian and Swahili captives who were sold during the East African slave trade from the 11th to the 19th century. This perspective is the general view accepted by scholars further supported by DNA testing that reveals a genetic link to Southern Eastern Africa as well as evident connections with the Swahili language, and culture.

== Societal discrimination in Yemen ==
Anthropologists such as Vombruck postulate that Yemen's history and social hierarchy that developed under various regimes, including the Zaydi Imamate, had created a hereditary, caste-like society. Today, the Akhdam people still occupy the very bottom of Yemen's social strata.

The Akhdam community suffers from extreme discrimination, persecution, and social exclusion from mainstream Yemeni society, from which it is distinguished by its members' Negrito-like physical features and stature. According to Robert F. Worth, however, recent waves of immigrants from Ethiopia and Somalia, many of them desperately poor, have fared better than the Akhdam and do not share their stigma. The contempt for the Akhdam people is expressed by a traditional Yemeni proverb:

"Clean your plate if it is touched by a dog, but break it if it's touched by a Khadem."

In the mid-20th century, the Akhdam people who lived in the vicinity of al-Gades (an exclusively Jewish village) were given the name "Kano" by Jews. While a Shafi'i lowland Muslim would eat from the same dish as a Jew, he would break a vessel touched by one of the Akhdam.

Though their social conditions have improved somewhat in modern times, the Akhdam are still stereotyped by mainstream Yemeni society: they have been called lowly, dirty, and immoral. Intermarriages between non-Akhdam and Akhdam are taboo and virtually prohibited, as the Al-Akhdam are deemed as untouchables. Men who do marry into the community risk banishment by their families.

Today, in Yemen, children born from mixed Akhdam and Yemeni parentage are called muwāldedīn, and are often still discriminated against in society.

The social inequality of the Akhdam is also analysed by Anne Meneley from a gendered perspective. Indeed, in Yemeni society, women have a certain number of practices to respect in order to be considered pious in the eyes of society. These practices are, among others, a certain behavior to be respected such as wearing the veil or a way of socializing and maintaining relationships. Women from the elite are linked to power and contribute to reproducing the relations of dominance that are exercised towards the Akhdams. In the eyes of the elite, Akhdam women are not respectable because they do not have acceptable moral behavior. They do not wear the hijab but, instead, they wear colorful gowns with wide sleeves and they go to the suq to sell goods even though the suq is supposed to be a place for men only. All these inappropriate behaviors, according to the dominant class, accentuate the domination of this class by opposing the respectable and pious elite and the Akhdams women who do not wear the veil and are morally inferior.

=== Economic status ===
In the face of extreme societal discrimination, the Al-Akhdam people are effectively forced to work in menial and undesirable jobs such as sweeping, shoe-making, and the cleaning of latrines. Those who are unemployed, most of whom are women, usually resort to begging.

Even the Akhdam people who are employed are not spared from discrimination. Akhdam street sweepers are rarely granted contracts even after decades of work, despite the fact that all Yemeni civil servants are supposed to be granted contracts after six months. They receive no benefits, and almost no time off.

The Akhdam reside in slum districts that are generally isolated from the rest of Yemeni society. It is hardly possible for the Akhdam people to afford shelter with even the most basic amenities such as electricity, running water and sewage disposal. Accordingly, Akhdam generally live in small huts haphazardly built of wood and cloth.

=== Health conditions ===
Due to poverty and the unsanitary living conditions, the Akhdam people are vulnerable to preventable diseases. The death rates from preventable diseases are worse than the nationwide average in Yemen. Many Al-Akhdam children suffer from diseases such as dyspnoea, malaria and polio, and the death rate is high. The reported infant mortality rate is also described as "appalling" by Robert F. Worth. Out of the deaths reported in an Akhdam shantytown over a year, about half were children under the age of 5, a quarter of whom were in the first month of life.

Studies by Al-Serouri et al. further report a poorer understanding of HIV risks amongst the Al-Akhdam community. Accordingly, group members also have higher reported rates and risks of contracting HIV infections.

Out of the deaths reported in an Akhdam shantytown over a year, about half were children under the age of 5, a quarter of whom were in the first month of life.

=== Activism and international visibility ===
Many NGOs and charitable organizations from other countries such as CARE International are reportedly working toward improving the living circumstances of the Akhdam. Such initiatives include the building of a chicken farm, sanitation projects, the provision of electricity and classes aimed at eradicating illiteracy. The extent of these efforts, however, is disputed, most notably by Huda Sief. Government corruption also means that monetary aid intended for the Akhdam is often misused or stolen.

Government officials, while admitting a historical disdain for the Akhdam among conventional Yemeni society, insist that there is no official discrimination. The Yemeni government has occasionally built shelters for the Akhdam, although it is reported that 30% of Akhdam who received such state housing sold it, choosing instead to return to their original neighborhoods. Despite the supposed absence of official discrimination, many Akhdam claim that officials often block their attempts to seek state services at schools and hospitals.

The search for rights and recognition is a daily task for the Akhdams. This daily struggle for survival further reinforces the stereotypes that other social classes have about the Akhdam community. To change this, many petitions and letters are being written asking the state for welfare and other assistance. This way of negotiating without violence and insurgency is due to the fact that the Akhdam community does not take the state as the enemy but as the one that has to defend the weakest citizens. These requests and petitions rarely succeed.

A significant step forward was achieved with the formation of a political party to represent them and possibly alleviate their conditions. The Yemeni revolt in 2011 had also roused many Akhdam people to participate in the uprising by appearing regularly in the demonstrations and sit-ins that filled the mains squares of the capital city Sanaa and Taiz. This popular uprising was taking place that called for egalitarian citizenship and recognition of the diversity of identities within Yemeni society. By egalitarian citizenship, the Yemeni people mean that every Yemeni on the street is equal. This uprising led to a transition period, running from March 2012 to February 2014, which was supposed to lead to a new, more cohesive Yemen. Many had hoped that the revolt would help end the cycle of racism that has placed them at the bottom of the social ladder.

=== Stereotypes and global discourse on race ===
The Akhdam are associated with a number of stereotypes. They are considered immoral because men let their wives interact with other men, ignorant of the Islamic religion, lenient towards theft and alcohol, or they are nomads without any property.

The emergence of the notion of race and racism in contemporary Yemen is linked to the emergence of the European racial configuration in the 1930s and then in Egypt following the revolution of 1952. In the Middle East, it is the "'unsuriyya" term that will spread. The notion of “'unsuriyya” or racism emerged in public discourse in Yemen in the 1950s as a critique of Hashemite privilege. Akhdam activists and politicians rely on the color of their skin to denounce the marginalization of their people. This amplifies their international visibility.

== Demographics ==
According to official estimates, the Akhdam numbered around 500,000 individuals in 2004. An organisation called "Yemen’s Sawa’a Organisation for Anti-Discrimination" said while official figures put them at about 1.5 million, their in field estimates put the number at more than 3 million residents in 2013, which is about 11% out of the total population of Yemen.

Some Akhdam live in segregated slums on the outskirts of Yemen's main urban centers. Many of them reside in the capital Sana'a, and others can also be found in Aden, Ta'izz, Lahij, Abyan, Al Hudaydah and Mukalla.

== Depictions in Yemeni literature ==
Several Yemeni authors have written about the Akhdam and their marginalization:

- Ali al-Muqri's 2008 novel Black Taste, Black Odor focuses on the Akhdam community living in Ta'izz and the discrimination they face.
- One of the characters in Mohammad Abdul-Wali's novel Sana'a: An Open City describes traveling to Al Hudaydah and witnessing a fire destroy the homes of the Akhdam living in the city's slums, an experience that shapes his pessimistic view of his country and its history.
- In his memoirs, Astonishment and Amazement, Zayd Mutee' Dammaj recalls encountering Akhdam working at the port of Al Hudaydah and witnessing their extreme socioeconomic marginalization.

== See also ==
- Human rights in Yemen
- Slavery in Yemen
- Indian Ocean slave trade
