= Afro-Arabs =

Ethnic group in the Arab World with African ancestry

العرب الأفارقة

Total population
- Approximately 1% of the middle east's population

Regions with significant populations
- Middle East: Saudi Arabia, United Arab Emirates, Oman, Kuwait, Bahrain, Qatar, Iraq, Palestine, Yemen; African Regions: Sudan, Chad, Tanzania, Comoros, Seychelles, Nigeria, Cameroon

Languages
- Arabic, Swahili (Minority)

Religion
- Islam (Mainly Sunni), Shia Islam (Minority)

Related ethnic groups
- Afro-Saudis, Afro-Omanis, Afro-Emiratis, Afro-Iraqis, Afro-Palestinians

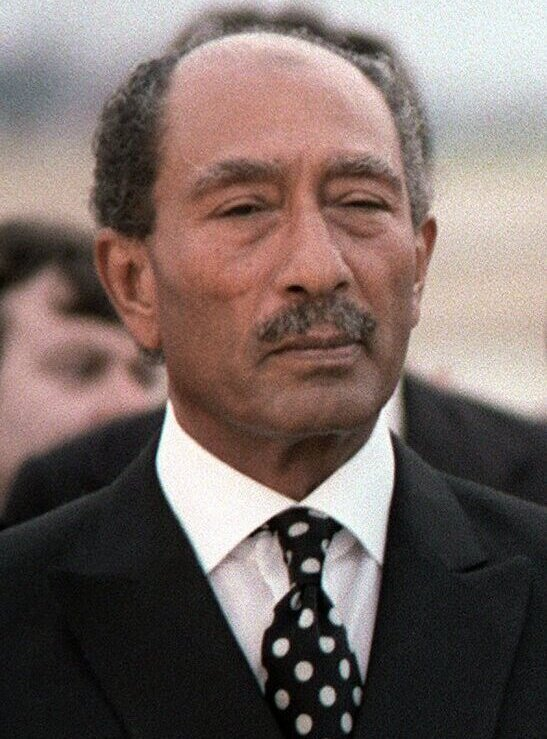
Anwar Sadat the most famous black Egyptian

Afro-Arabs, African Arabs, or Black Arabs are Arabs who have substantial or predominant Sub-Saharan African ancestry. These include primarily minority groups in the United Arab Emirates, Yemen, Saudi Arabia, Oman, Kuwait, Qatar, Bahrain, Palestine and Iraq. The term may also refer to various Arab groups in certain African regions.

== History ==
From the 7th century onward Muslim communities were established along the East African coast, subsequently spreading inland. The Arab slave trades, which began in pre-Islamic times but reached their height between 650 AD and 1950 AD, transported millions of African people from the Nile Valley, the Horn of Africa, and the eastern African coast across the Red Sea to Arabia as part of the Red Sea slave trade. Millions more were taken from West Africa and East Africa across the Sahara as part of the trans-Saharan slave trade.

By around the first millennium AD, Persian traders established contact with trading towns on what is now called the Swahili Coast.

The Portuguese conquered these trading centers after the discovery of the Cape Road. From the 1700s to the early 1800s, Muslim forces of the Omani empire re-seized these market towns, mainly on the islands of Pemba and Zanzibar. In these territories, Arabs from Yemen and Oman settled alongside the local "African" populations, thereby spreading Islam and establishing Afro-Arab communities. The Niger-Congo Swahili language and culture largely evolved through these contacts between Arabs and the native Bantu population.

In the Arab states of the Persian Gulf, descendants of people from the Swahili Coast perform traditional Liwa and Fann at-Tanbura music and dance, and the mizmar is also played by Afro-Arabs of West African descent in the Tihamah and Hejaz.

In addition, Stambali of Tunisia and Gnawa music of Morocco are both ritual music and dances that in part trace their origins to West African musical styles.

== Notable Afro-Arabs ==
- Antarah ibn Shaddad
- Ziryab
- Mahboob Qirvanian
- Bilal Ibn Rabah
- Wahshi ibn Harb
- Umm Ayman
- Al-Jahiz
- Nur Al Hausawi
- Saad Al-Salim Al-Sabah
- Hamad Al-Montashari
- Haroune Camara
- Majed Abdullah
- Ali Al-Habsi
- Sheikh Ali Abdullah Al-Sabah
- Tareg Hamedi
- Hawsawi family
- Fahad Al-Muwallad
- Randa Abd Al-Aziz
- Mohamed Kanno
- Ahmed Barman
- Abdullah Idrees
- Mohamed Awadalla
- Ali Salmeen
- Saeed Juma
- Mohammed Noor
- Khalid Eisa
- Fares Juma
- Ali Khaseif
- Majid Rashid
- Khalifa Al Hammadi
- Fahad Khamees
- Khamees Saad
- Ahmed Khalil
- Ismail Matar
- Hassan Hamza
- Ismail Al Hammadi
- Abdulaziz Haikal
- Yahya Al-Ghassani
- Tahnoon Al-Zaabi
- Salmin Khamis
- Abdulaziz Sanqour
- Etab
- Saud Abdulhamid
- Ahmed Abdulla
- Rayyanah Barnawi
- Mukhtar Ali
- Khaled Aziz
- Redha Tukar
- Saeed Al-Owairan
- Abdel Rab Idris
- Abdulaziz Al-Bishi
- Suleiman Obeid
- Muhammad Saad al-Beshi
- Osama Al-Muwallad
- Dalia Mubarak
- Hamdan Al-Bishi
- Abdullah Al-Salem
- Fahd bin Saeed
- Adil al-Kalbani
- Qusay Munir
- Miami Band
- Fatima Bernawi
- Karama Mursal
- Adel Khamis
- Bilal Al-Shami
- Khaled Al-Mulla
- Awad Al-Dukhi
- Hassan Al-Tambakti
- Hamad Al-Yami
- Hamdan Al Abri
- فرج عبد الكريم
- Adnan Taess
- Hussein Najjar

== See also ==
- Al-Akhdam
- Afro-Asians
- Afro-Emiratis
- Afro-Iranians
- Afro–Middle Easterners
- Afro-Turks
- trans-Saharan slave trade
- Indian Ocean slave trade
- Red Sea slave trade
- Black Guard
- Gnawa
- Haratin
- Shirazi people
- Swahili people
- Zanj

== Bibliography ==
- Hinde, Sidney Langford (1897). The Fall of the Congo Arabs. London: Methuen & Co.
- Mazrui, Alamin M.; Mutunga, Willy, eds. (2004). Debating the African Condition: Race, gender, and culture conflict (illustrated ed.). Africa World Press. ISBN 9781592211456.
