= Afro–Middle Easterners =

Afro–Middle Easterners, African Middle Easterners or Black Middle Easterners may refer to:

- Afro-Arabs:
  - Afro-Emiratis
  - Afro-Iraqis
  - Afro-Jordanians
  - Afro-Omanis
  - Afro-Palestinians
  - Afro-Saudis
  - Afro-Syrians
  - Al-Akhdam
- Afro-Iranians
- Afro-Turks

== See also ==
- Ethnic groups in the Middle East
