= 1894 in Iran =

- Decades
- See also: Other events of 1894; Years in Iran

The following lists events that happened during 1894 in Qajar era.

== Incumbents ==
- Monarch: Naser al-Din Shah Qajar

== Births ==
- May 12 – Sultan al-Wa'izin Shirazi, Scholar of Islam.
- October 5 – Abolhassan Sadighi, Iranian sculptor and painter.
- October 5 – Amirteymour Kalali, Iranian politician.
- ? – Hossein Behzad, Iranian painter.
- ? – Jalal Afshar, Iranian faculty.
- ? – Javad Khamenei, father of Iran's supreme leader.
- ? – Mahboob Qirvanian.
- ? – Mohammad Ali Varasteh, Iranian politician.
- ? – Mohammad Hossein Mirza Firouz, Qajar prince.
- ? – Mohammad-Hassan Shamshiri, Iranian philanthropist.
- ? – Morteza Yazdanpanah, Iranian politician.
- ? – Isa Sedigh, Iranian writer and politician.
