= Hawsawi =

Prominent Afro-Saudi family

The Hawsawi (Arabic: هوساوي, romanized: Hawsāwī) are a prominent and large Black Saudi family whose name derives from the Hausa people. The Hawsawi of Saudi Arabia are the descendants of the first wave of migrants from Hausaland to the Hijaz region in response to British colonization and proselytization efforts there in the late 19th century AD.

== History ==
The Hausa kingdoms were a loosely-connected group of Islamic city-states between the Western Sudanic (بلاد السودان) kingdoms of Ancient Ghana, Mali and Songhai and the Eastern Sudanic Kanem–Bornu Empire. The first historical mention of these kingdoms was made by Muslim geographer and historian al-Yaʿqūbī in the 3rd century AH (9th century AD on the Western calendar).

The pre-historic origins of the Hausa people are unknown, but one theory includes a migration of peoples from the southern Sahara who, leaving their lands due to desertification, established new settlements in what would become known as "Kasar Hausa". Another theory suggests that the Hausa people descend from Shuwa Arabs who left the western shore of Lake Chad when the lake shrank (due to desertification also affecting Sahara-adjacent areas) and settled new and fertile land in the far-north of modern-day Nigeria. Neither of these theories is supported by archaeological evidence. As a consequence, a third hypothesis arose, which is that the Hausa had not migrated from another area but were indigenous to the region. This theory is supported by the fact that there is no tradition of prehistoric migration in Hausa oral history.

After their foundation in the first millennium AD the Hausa city-states developed internecine trade resulting in a common language, laws and customs. As trade grew they became known for fishing, hunting, agriculture, salt-mining, and blacksmithing. Eventually, city-states like Katsina became bases of trans-Saharan trade in salt, cloth, leather and grain by the 14th century AD. Access to Arab trade and investment networks fostered the development of a internationally-networked feudal aristocracy that persists to this day. This merchant-nobility adopted Islam and use of the Arabic script, which was used as first Hausa writing system.

The Hausa kingdoms were incorporated into the Sultanate of Sokoto as a result of the Jihad of Usman dan Fodio (which facilitated the mass-adoption of Islam and attendant literacy among commoners and peasants in the area) in the early 19th century AD. Following the Berlin Conference European imperialism expanded into Southern Nigeria, and by 1901 made a push into the Sokoto Caliphate. By 1903 British occupation forces had successfully captured Sokoto and appointed Muhammadu Attahiru II as caliph.

The British came with instruments of cultural imperialism, such as Anglican missionaries and Western education, which the Hausa population universally resisted. Certain Muslim emigrants decided to travel east ("make hijra")—to Makkah, al-Madinah an-Nabi and Jidda. These migrants arrived in Saudi Arabia already speaking and writing Arabic, which facilitated their assimilation into Saudi culture.

The Hawsawi of Saudi Arabia are the descendants of the first wave of these migrants to the Hijaz region.

- There were neighboring west African communities, such as the Fulani and Kanuri, who also migrated to Saudi Arabia and go by the names "Fallata" and "Barnawi" respectively.

== Notable Figures ==
- Hamzah Hawsawi, Saudi singer and winner of season 4 of The X Factor Arabia
- Etab (1947–2007), Saudi singer
- Bashaer Hawsawi (born 1992), Saudi contemporary visual artist and desginer
- Nur Al Hausawi, Saudi-American philanthropist and wealth manager
- Ahmad Hawsawi, Saudi engineer and Chief Executive Officer of Siemens Saudi Arabia
- Zainab Idrees Hawsawi, Saudi writer and Chief of Communications for Saudi Arabia at Snap (company)
- Mustafa al-Hawsawi (born 1968), member of al-Qaeda and allegedly an organizer and financer of the September 11 attacks
- Osama Hawsawi (born 1984), Saudi football player
- Omar Hawsawi (born 1985), Saudi football player
- Motaz Hawsawi (born 1992), Saudi football player
- Abdullah Al Hawsawi (born 1996), Saudi football player
- Abdulelah Hawsawi (born 2001), Saudi football player
- Zakaria Hawsawi (born 2001), Saudi football player
- Aysha Hamza Hawsawi, Saudi neurosurgeon
- Abeer Hawsawi, Saudi doctor
- Alaa Hawsawi (born 1992), Saudi doctor
- Ashraf Hawsawi, Saudi doctor
