= Afro-Saudis =

Racial group

الأفرو-سعوديون (Arabic)

Total population
- 2.7% of Saudi Arabia’s total population

Regions with significant populations
- Riyadh, Medina, Jeddah, Mecca, Dammam, Tabuk, Jizan

Languages
- Arabic

Religion
- Islam (mostly Sunni)

Related ethnic groups
- Afro-Arabs, Afro-Omanis, Afro-Emiratis, Afro-Iraqis, Afro-Palestinians

Afro-Saudis, also known as Black Saudis, are citizens of Saudi Arabia who have ancestry from any of the Black racial groups of Africa. They are spread all around the country, but they are mostly found in the major cities of Saudi Arabia, especially in the provinces of Mecca and Medina. Afro-Saudis speak Arabic and adhere to Islam. While some Black Saudis descend from slaves brought through the Arab slave trade, the majority descend from Muslim pilgrims, primarily from West Africa, who settled in the cities of Mecca and Jeddah.

The term "takarnah", meaning people of takrur, is sometimes used to refer to Hejazis of West African descent, though their origins are diverse. This is evident in family names such as Hawsawi, Fallatah, and Bernawi.

== History ==
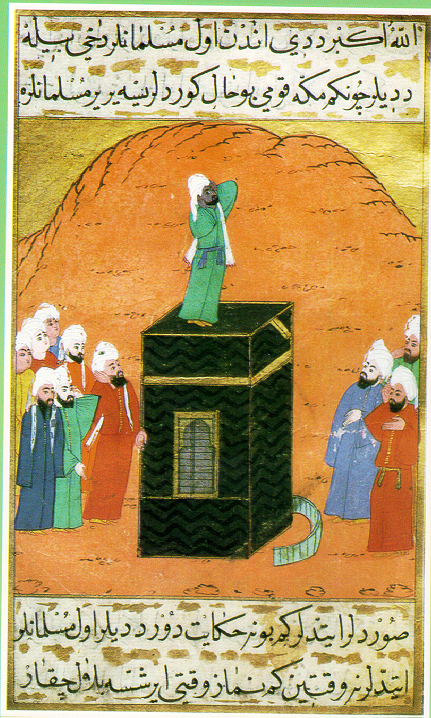
Bilal ibn Rabah, an Abyssinian who was enslaved by Pre-Islamic Arabs was Islam's first Muezzin

Arabia and Africa have been in contact starting with the obsidian exchange networks of the 7th millennium BC. These networks were strengthened by the rise of Egyptian dynasties of the 4th millennium BC. Anthropologists have indicated the likely existence of settlements in Arabia, from the people of the Horn of Africa, as early as the 3rd and 2nd millenniums BC.

Some afro-saudis are descendants of slaves, trafficked mainly via the Ancient Red Sea slave trade. the slaves were mostly used for pearl diving in the coastal areas and date farming, worked as domestic slaves.

historically, the institution of slavery in the region of the later Saudi Arabia was reflected in the institution of slavery in the Rashidun Caliphate (632–661) slavery in the Umayyad Caliphate (661–750), slavery in the Abbasid Caliphate (750–1258), slavery in the Mamluk Sultanate (1258–1517) and finally slavery in the Ottoman Empire (1517–1918). Slavery in Saudi Arabia was not abolished until 1962.

== Population ==
In 2025, their population was between 5% or around 3% of Saudi Arabia's 35,300,000 population.

== Social condition ==
Slaves in the Middle East were allowed to own land. Children of two slaves were born into slavery, however the child of a free man and his concubine were not born a slave if the father acknowledged fatherhood. Islamic Law allowed for Muslims to enslave non-Muslims, unless they were zimmis (protected minorities who had accepted Muslim rule), and slaves were therefore non-Muslims imported from non-Muslim lands outside of the Empire. However, the conversion of a non-Muslim slave to Islam after their enslavement did not require the enslaver to manumit his slave.

Skin color played a distinctive role even amongst slaves. Many activists amongst Afro-Saudis complain that they are not given media representation and are unable to find opportunities to improve their social condition.

== Notable Afro-Saudis ==
- Nur Al Hausawi
- Hamad Al-Montashari
- Haroune Camara
- Majed Abdullah
- Tareg Hamedi
- Hawsawi family
- Fahad Al-Muwallad
- Mohamed Kanno
- Etab
- Saud Abdulhamid
- Ahmed Abdulla
- Rayyanah Barnawi
- Mukhtar Ali
- Khaled Aziz
- Redha Tukar
- Saeed Al-Owairan
- Abdel Rab Idris
- Abdulaziz Al-Bishi
- Muhammad Saad al-Beshi
- Osama Al-Muwallad
- Mohammed Noor
- Dalia Mubarak
- Hamdan Al-Bishi
- Abdullah Al-Salem
- Fahd bin Saeed
- Adil al-Kalbani
- Hassan Al-Tambakti
- Hamad Al-Yami
- Hussein Najjar

== See also ==
- Slavery in Saudi Arabia
