= Saudi Americans =

Americans of Saudi descent

Saudi Americans أمريكيون سعوديون
Total population
- 258,883 91,372 American of Saudi origin 167,511 Saudi resident

Regions with significant populations
- California, New York City, Washington DC, Florida, Ohio, Michigan

Languages
- American English, Arabic (Najdi Arabic, Hijazi Arabic)

Religion
- Islam

Related ethnic groups
- Arab Americans

Saudi Americans (Arabic: سُعُودِيُّونْ أَمْرِيكِيُّونْ, romanized: suʿudiyyūn ʼamrīkiyyūn) are Americans of total or partial Saudi descent. According to the 2020 census, 30,563 people of Saudi origin were living in the United States. In 2023, according to the American Community Survey, 60,809 Saudi-born people were living in the US. As of 2026 there are currently 15,265 Saudi students who currently reside in the United States. Saudi Arabia and the US have had important political relations since the 1940s.

== History ==
The first Saudis who settled in the United States were personal ambassadors of the Saudi Arabia Embassy in Washington, D.C., in the mid-1940s. After the World War II, many Saudis students began to travel to the United States to study in its universities. However, in the 1960s, when the universities of Saudi Arabia began to work, the number of Saudi students abroad started to drop. The US Immigration and Nationality Act of 1965 limited the number of Saudis who could obtain US citizenship, as it was only accessible to educated immigrants.

The Saudis established a great community in the Washington, DC metropolitan area, formed by a great number of families. Thus, the government of Saudi Arabia founded the Islamic Saudi Academy in Alexandria, Virginia in 1984 to provide an Arab and Muslim education to children. This academy also allowed the enrollment of Muslim children of other origins. "The academy services 1,150 children in kindergarten through the 12th grade".

In the 1990 census, only 4,486 people claimed to be of Saudi descent.

== Demography ==
Individual Saudi citizens, as well as their government, have made financial contributions to Muslim organizations. Nevertheless, the relatively small Saudi community, and the low number of Saudis who choose to live permanently in the United States has limited uniquely the cultural developments of Saudi-Americans.

In the 1990 census, Saudi Arabians reported living in 44 of the 50 of United States. The greatest number, 517, resided in California. There were five additional states that reported over 200 Saudi Arabians: Colorado, Florida, Pennsylvania, Texas, and Virginia.

There are a variety of reasons why so few Saudi Arabians choose to permanently live in the United States. Among these were the wealth of Saudi Arabia, the religious faith and pride of Saudis who found it difficult to maintain an Islamic lifestyle in the United States, and a lack of factors motivating citizens to leave Saudi Arabia. The limited number of marriages between the US and Saudi citizens may also have contributed to the low number of Saudi immigrants and of Saudi Americans.

Political dissent and dissatisfaction with the restrictions of living in an orthodox Muslim society were among the factors that encouraged migration. The US Immigration and Nationality Act of 1965, that gave special treatment to those educated immigrants established in the United States, also helped Saudi immigrants gain U.S. citizenship.

Arabic is the national language of Saudi Arabia, but English is commonly used in business transactions, particularly with foreigners. There were ten large newspapers operating in Saudi Arabia in 1992, all privately owned; seven were printed in Arabic and three in English. English is commonly taught in the public schools, and sometimes French is offered in private academies. The Saudi men living in the United States and who do not wish to return to Saudi Arabia do have other options when seeking a spouse. In the 1990s, the Islamic Society of North America (ISNA), headquartered in Plainfield, Indiana, maintained an electronic database of persons seeking to marry. Through it, Muslims living in the United States and Canada were able to locate potential spouses with whom they could share Islamic values. Many years ago, the restrictions for Saudi women desiring to marry non-Saudis were severe. As of 1999, they were required to get a royal dispensation to marry anyone not from Saudi Arabia, Qatar, Kuwait, Bahrain, Oman, or the United Arab Emirates. In 1999, the American Embassy was aware of only four Saudi women married to American men. For these reasons, Saudi men and women living in the United States are unlikely to marry with Americans, thereby eliminating one aspect of Americanization: The cross-cultural marriages that have played key roles in helping to establish other ethnic communities in the United States.

== Notable people ==
- Sarah Attar, Olympic track and field runner of half-Saudi descent from California
- Nur Al Hausawi, philanthropist and wealth manager of Afro-Saudi descent living in New York and California

== See also ==
- Saudi Arabia–United States relations
- Saudi Australians
- Saudi Canadians
- Arab diaspora
- Americans living in Saudi Arabia
