= Talal Maddah discography =

This is a list of albums by musician Talal Maddah. Before he joined Fonoun Al-Jazeerah Records, Maddah didn't put numbers on his albums, and there are many albums that were released even before there were labeled records.

| # | Album name | Album number | Released | Label | Notes |
|---|---|---|---|---|---|
| 1 | Sahrah with Talal Maddah 1 (A Night with Talal Maddah) | * | 1960s | MoriPhone Records | |
| 2 | Sahrah with Talal Maddah 2 (A Night with Talal Maddah) | * | 1960s | MoriPhone Records | |
| 3 | Sahrah with Talal Maddah 3 (A Night with Talal Maddah) | * | 1960s | MoriPhone Records | |
| 4 | Sahrah with Talal Maddah 4 (A Night with Talal Maddah) | * | 1960s | MoriPhone Records | |
| 5 | Jalsah 1 (Live Performance) | * | 1970s | Hayza'a Records | |
| 6 | Talal Maddah 1 | * | 1970s | Sout Al-Jazeerah Records | |
| 7 | Talal Maddah 2 | * | 1970s | Sout Al-Jazeerah Records | |
| 8 | Marrat & Marr Al-Zaman (She Passed By & The Time Passed) | * | 1970s | Golden Cassette | |
| 9 | Jamma'atna Al-Thorouf (The Times Brought Us Together) | * | 1970s | Yousef Haydar Records | |
| 10 | Khelsat Al-Qissah (The Story Has Ended) | * | 1970s | Layali Al-Ons Records | |
| 11 | Talal Maddah 3 | * | 1970s | Cleopatra Records | |
| 12 | Hobbak Sabani (Your Love Captured Me) | * | 1970s | Cleopatra Records | |
| 13 | Ta'allaq Qalbi (My Heart Is In Love) | * | 1970s | Cleopatra Records | |
| 14 | Wa'adek Meta? (When Is Your Promise?) | * | 1980s | Golden Cassette | |
| 15 | Sayedi Qum (Baby Wake Up) | 1 | 1980s | Funoun Al-Jazeerah Records | |
| 16 | Talal Maddah With Etab 1 (Live Performance With The Singer Etab) | 2 | 1980s | Funoun Al-Jazeerah Records | |
| 17 | Ya Hayati (Oh My Love & Life) | 3 | 1980s | Funoun Al-Jazeerah Records | |
| 18 | Talal Maddah With Etab 2 (Live Performance With The Singer Etab) | 4 | 1980s | Funoun Al-Jazeerah Records | |
| 19 | Mokhtarat Men Aghani Talal Maddah (The Best of Talal Maddah) | 5 | 1980s | Funoun Al-Jazeerah Records | |
| 20 | Jalsah With Talal Maddah (Live Performance) | 6 | 1980s | Funoun Al-Jazeerah Records | |
| 21 | Ahrejatni (She Confused Me) | 7 | 1980s | Funoun Al-Jazeerah Records | |
| 22 | Matha Aqoul? (What Should I Say?) | 8 | 1980s | Funoun Al-Jazeerah Records | |
| 23 | Jatni Teqoul (She Came To Me Saying...) | 9 | 1980s | Funoun Al-Jazeerah Records | |
| 24 | Ana Al-A'asheq (I'm The Lover) | 10 | 1980s | Funoun Al-Jazeerah Records | |
| 25 | Rafa'at Al-Sout Aghanni (I Raised My Voice Singing) | 11 | 1980s | Funoun Al-Jazeerah Records | |
| 26 | Wa'adek Meta? (When Is Your Promise?) | 12 | 1980s | Funoun Al-Jazeerah Records | |
| 27 | La Teshed Al-Qaid (Don't Tighten The Cuffs) | 13 | 1980s | Funoun Al-Jazeerah Records | |
| 28 | Tesaddeq? (Would You Believe Me?) | 14 | 1980s | Funoun Al-Jazeerah Records | |
| 29 | Monawa'at Talal Maddah (Various of Talal Maddah) | 15 | 1980s | Funoun Al-Jazeerah Records | |
| 30 | Al-Ekhteyar (The Choice) | 16 | 1980s | Funoun Al-Jazeerah Records | |
| 31 | Ma'a Al-Ayam (With The Days) | 17 | 1980s | Funoun Al-Jazeerah Records | |
| 32 | Ezz Al-Watan (The Pride Of The Homeland) | 18 | 1980s | Funoun Al-Jazeerah Records | |
| 33 | Ella Ana (But Me ..) | 19 | 1980s | Funoun Al-Jazeerah Records | |
| 34 | Ma Neseetiny (You Didn't Forget Me) | 20 | 1980s | Funoun Al-Jazeerah Records | |
| 35 | Al-Haq Ma'ay (I'm Right) | 21 | 1980s | Funoun Al-Jazeerah Records | |
| 36 | Sarkhah (Shout) | 22 | 1990s | Funoun Al-Jazeerah Records | |
| 37 | Qassat Dhefayerha (She Cut Her Hair Braids) | 23 | 1990s | Funoun Al-Jazeerah Records | |
| 38 | Sa'ab Al-So'al (It's A Tough Question) | 24 | 1990s | Funoun Al-Jazeerah Records | |
| 39 | Menho Habeebak? (Who's Your Lover?) | 25 | 1990s | Funoun Al-Jazeerah Records | |
| 40 | A'atherouni (Excuse Me) | 26 | 1990s | Funoun Al-Jazeerah Records | |
| 41 | Eshb Al-Fakhr (The Grass Of Honor) | 27 | 1990s | Funoun Al-Jazeerah Records | |
| 42 | Deerety (My Homeland) | 28 | 1990s | Funoun Al-Jazeerah Records | |
| 43 | Te'eeshy Ya Saudia (Long Live Saudi Arabia) | 29 | 1990s | Funoun Al-Jazeerah Records | |
| 44 | Al-Sekout Arham (It's Better To Be Silent) | 30 | 1990s | Funoun Al-Jazeerah Records | |
| 45 | Suwai'at Al-Aseel (Afternoon Times) | 31 | 1990s | Funoun Al-Jazeerah Records | Remaster of old songs |
| 46 | Tedallel Ya Qamar (Be Coquetry My Love) | 32 | 1990s | Funoun Al-Jazeerah Records | |
| 47 | Najmah We Nahar (A Star & A River) | 33 | 1990s | Funoun Al-Jazeerah Records | |
| 48 | Zaman Al-Samt (Time Of Silence) | 34 | 1990s | Funoun Al-Jazeerah Records | Remaster of old songs |
| 49 | Masdar Ahzani (Source Of My Sorrows) | 35 | 1990s | Funoun Al-Jazeerah Records | Remaster of old songs |
| 50 | Jalsah Ma'a Talal Maddah (Live Performance) | 36 | 1990s | Funoun Al-Jazeerah Records | |
| 51 | Ana Raje'e Ashoufak (I'm Coming Back To See You) | 37 | 1990s | Funoun Al-Jazeerah Records | |
| 52 | Meshtaq Le Al-Maghreb (I Miss Morocco) | 38 | 1990s | Funoun Al-Jazeerah Records | |
| 53 | La Buka'a Yenfa'a (Crying Won't Be Good) | 39 | 1990s | Funoun Al-Jazeerah Records | Remaster of old songs |
| 54 | Alef Shokran (A Thousand Thank You) | 40 | 1990s | Funoun Al-Jazeerah Records | |
| 55 | Ta'aly (Come To Me) | 41 | 1990s | Funoun Al-Jazeerah Records | |
| 56 | Watani Al-Habeeb (My Beloved Country) | 42 | 1990s | Funoun Al-Jazeerah Records | |
| 57 | Tayeb (So ...) | 43 | 1990s | Funoun Al-Jazeerah Records | |
| 58 | Ya Bent (O Girl) | 44 | 1990s | Funoun Al-Jazeerah Records | |
| 59 | Jalsah Ma'a Talal Maddah (Live Performance) | 45 | 1990s | Funoun Al-Jazeerah Records | Remaster of old songs |
| 60 | Adhat Al-Ebham (Bite Of The Thumb) | 46 | 1990s | Funoun Al-Jazeerah Records | |
| 61 | Aghrab (Strangers) | 47 | 1990s | Funoun Al-Jazeerah Records | Re-release of old songs |
| 62 | Maqadeer (Destinies) | 48 | 1990s | Funoun Al-Jazeerah Records | Re-release of old songs |
| 63 | Azz Al-Kalam (No Talking) | 49 | 1990s | Funoun Al-Jazeerah Records | |
| 64 | La Neftereq (We Shouldn't Be Apart) | 50 | 1990s | Funoun Al-Jazeerah Records | |
| 65 | Saltanah (Melodies) | 51 | 1990s | Funoun Al-Jazeerah Records | Remaster of old songs |
| 66 | Jalsah Ma'a Talal Maddah (Live Performance) | 52 | 1990s | Funoun Al-Jazeerah Records | Remaster of old songs |
| 67 | Thahab (Gold) | 53 | 1990s | Funoun Al-Jazeerah Records | |
| 68 | Al-Etter (The Perfume) | 54 | 1990s | Funoun Al-Jazeerah Records | |
| 69 | Monawa'at Talal Maddah (Variouses of Talal Maddah) | 55 | 1990s | Funoun Al-Jazeerah Records | Remaster of old songs |
| 70 | Mwahhedeen (Oberate) | 56 | 1990s | Funoun Al-Jazeerah Records | |
| 71 | Esheqtuh ... we Danat (I Loved Him .. & Other Folks) | 57 | 1990s | Funoun Al-Jazeerah Records | Remaster of old songs |
| 72 | Esbou'e (Week) | 58 | 1990s | Funoun Al-Jazeerah Records | |
| 73 | Saltanah 2 (Melodies) | 59 | 2001 | Funoun Al-Jazeerah Records | Released posthumously |
| 74 | Arfodh Al-Masafah (I Refuse The Distance) | 60 | 2002 | Funoun Al-Jazeerah Records | Released posthumously |
| 75 | Qoulou Le Al-Ghaly (Tell The Precious One) | 61 | 2003 | Funoun Al-Jazeerah Records | Released posthumously |
| 76 | Marrat (She Passed By Me) | 62 | 2004 | Funoun Al-Jazeerah Records | Released posthumously |
| 77 | Saltanah 3 (Melodies) | 63 | 2005 | Funoun Al-Jazeerah Records | Released posthumously |
| 78 | Jalsat Nagham (Live Performance) | 64 | 2006 | Funoun Al-Jazeerah Records | Released posthumously |
| 79 | Aghani Yamaneyah (Songs From Yemen) | 65 | 2006 | Funoun Al-Jazeerah Records | Released posthumously |
| 80 | Ba'ad Rouhi (More Than My Life) | 66 | 2007 | Funoun Al-Jazeerah Records | Released posthumously |
| 81 | Men Yebasherni? (Who Will Tell Me The Good News?) | 67 | 2008 | Funoun Al-Jazeerah Records | Released posthumously |
| 82 | Nabateyat (Folks) | 68 | 2009 | Funoun Al-Jazeerah Records | Released posthumously |
| 83 | La Taohashouna (Don't Be Far For Long) | 69 | 2009 | Funoun Al-Jazeerah Records | Released posthumously |
| 84 | Al-Hobb we Enta we Ana (Love, You & Me) | 70 | 2010 | Funoun Al-Jazeerah Records | Released posthumously |
