= Slavery in Iran =

   

The history of slavery in Iran (Persia) during various ancient, medieval, and modern periods is sparsely catalogued. The history of slavery in Iran also overlaps with the history of slavery in Azerbaijan, which was a part of Iran during the time period when legal chattel slavery existed there.

Slavery in general was not uncommon in the past throughout various regions of the world. Slavery in Iran was made illegal in 1929.

== Slavery in pre-Achaemenid Iran ==
Slaves are attested in the cuneiform record of the ancient Elamites, a pre-Iranian indigenous people who inhabited Elam (southwestern Iran), including the ancient cities of Anshan and Susa, which were eventually incorporated into the Achaemenid Empire. Because of their participation in cuneiform culture, the Elamites are one of the few pre-Achaemenid civilizations of Iran to leave written attestations of slavery, and details of slavery among the Gutians, Kassites, Medes, Mannaeans, and other preliterate peoples of Bronze Age Iran are largely unrecorded.

== Classical antiquity ==
=== Slavery in the Achaemenid Empire (c. 550–330 BC) ===
Slavery was an existing institution in Egypt, Media and Babylonia before the rise of the Achaemenid Empire.

The most common word used to designate a slave in the Achaemenid was bandaka-, which was also used to express general dependence. In his writing, Darius I uses this word to refer to his satraps and generals. Greek writers of the time expressed that all Persian people were slaves to their king. Other terms used to describe slaves within the empire could also have other meanings; such as "kurtaš" and "māniya-", which could mean hired or indentured workers in some contexts.

Herodotus has mentioned enslavement with regards to rebels of the Lydians who revolted against Achaemenid rule and captured Sardis. He has also mentioned slavery after the rebellion of Egypt in the city of Barce during the time of Cambyses and the assassination of the Persian satrap in Egypt. He also mentions the defeat of Ionians, and their allies Eretria who supported the Ionians and subsequent enslavement of the rebels and supporting population.

Xenophon at his work Anabasis mention slaves in the Persian Empire. For example, he writes about the slaves of Asidates when he is describing a night raid.

Persian aristocrats in Babylonia and other conquered states were major slave owners under the Achaemenid dynasty. These defeated peoples supplied them with a sizable portion of their domestic slaves. Every year, the Babylonians had to provide a tribute of five hundred boys. Information on privately owned slaves is scarce, but there are surviving cuneiform documents from Babylonia and the Persepolis Administrative Archives which record slave sales and contracts.

According to Muhammad A. Dandamayev:

On the whole, in the [[Achaemenid]] empire, there was only small number of slaves in relation to the number of free persons and slave labor was in no position to supplant free labor. The basis of agriculture was the labor of free farmers and tenants and in handicrafts the labor of free artisans, whose occupation was usually inherited within the family, likewise predominated. In these countries of the empire, slavery had already undergone important changes by the time of the emergence of the Persian state. Debt slavery was no longer common. The practice of pledging one's person for debt, not to mention self-sale, had totally disappeared by the Persian period. In the case of nonpayment of a debt by the appointed deadline, the creditor could turn the children of the debtor into slaves. A creditor could arrest an insolvent debtor and confine him to debtor's prison. However, the creditor could not sell a debtor into slavery to a third party. Usually the debtor paid off the loan by free work for the creditor, thereby retaining his freedom.

=== Slavery in Parthian Iran (c. 150s BC–224 AD) ===
According to Plutarch, there were many slaves in the army of the Parthian general Surena. The meaning of the term "slaves" (doûloi, servi) mentioned in this context is disputed, as it may be pejorative rather than literal.

Plutarch also mentions that after the Romans were defeated in the Battle of Carrhae all the surviving Roman legionnaires were enslaved by the Parthians.

=== Slavery in Sasanian Iran (c. 224–642 AD) ===
Under this period Roman prisoners of war were used in farming in Babylonia, Shush, and Persis.

==== Sasanian laws on slavery ====
Some of the laws governing the ownership and treatment of slaves can be found in the legal compilation called the Matigan-i Hazar Datistan, a collection of rulings by Sasanian judges. Principles that can be inferred from the laws include:

- Sources of slaves were both foreign (e.g., non-Zoroastrians captives from warfare or raiding or slaves imported from outside the Empire by traders) or domestic (e.g., hereditary slaves, children sold into slavery by their fathers, or criminals enslaved as punishment). Some cases suggest that a criminal's family might also be condemned to servitude. At the time of the manuscript's composition, Iranian slavery was hereditary on the mother's side (so that a child of a free man and a slave woman would be a slave), although the author reports that in earlier Persian history it may have been the opposite, being inherited from the father's side.
- Slave-owners had the right to the slaves' income.
- While slaves were formally chattel (property) and were liable to the same legal treatment as nonhuman property (for example, they could be sold at will, rented, owned jointly, inherited, given as security for a loan, etc.), Sasanian courts did not treat them completely as objects; for example, slaves were allowed to testify in court in cases concerning them, rather than only permitted to be represented by their owners.
- Slaves were often given to the Zoroastrian fire temples as a pious offering, in which case they and their descendants would become temple-slaves.
- Excessive cruelty towards slaves could result in the owners' being brought to court; a court case involving a slave whose owner tried to drown him in the Tigris River is recorded, though without stating the outcome of the case.
- If a non-Zoroastrian slave, such as a Christian slave, converted to Zoroastrianism, he or she could pay his or her price and attain freedom; i.e., as long as the owner was compensated, manumission was required.
- Owners could also voluntarily manumit their slaves, in which case the former slave became a subject of the Sasanian King of Kings and could not lawfully be re-enslaved later. Manumissions were recorded, which suggests that a freedman who was challenged would be able to document their free status.
- Uniquely in comparison to Western slave systems, Sasanian slavery recognized partial manumission (relevant in the case of a jointly owned slave, only some of whose owners were willing to manumit). In case of a slave who was, e.g., one-half manumitted, the slave would serve in alternating years.

To free a slave (irrespective of his or her faith) was considered a good deed. Slaves had some rights including keeping gifts from the owner and at least three days of rest in the month.

== Medieval Iran ==
=== Slavery under the Umayyads, Abbasids, and Persianate Muslim dynasties (c. 642–1220 AD) ===
After the Islamic conquest of Iran, slavery and slave trade came to be similar to those conducted in other Muslim regions, and were directed toward non-Muslims. The slaves were provided to Iran and from Iran to slavery in the Abbasid Caliphate from four directions; domestic slave trade of non-Muslims within Iran; the slave trade from Central Asia; the slave trade from the Volga trade route via the Samanid slave trade; the and Caucasus via the Black Sea slave trade; and the Indian Ocean slave trade.

According to Islamic practice of slavery and slave trade, non-Muslims were free to be enslaved, and since many parts of Iran remained Zoroastrian the first centuries after conquest, some non-Muslim "infidel territory" were exposed to Muslim slave raids, particularly Daylam in northwestern Iran and the Pagan mountainous region of Ḡūr in central Afghanistan. Persian-Zoroastrian slaves became common in the Umayyad and Abbasid Caliphate, and many of the mothers, concubines, and slave qiyan musicians are identified as originally Persian Zoroastrians.

The slave trade of the Samanid Empire in Central Asia, the Samanid slave trade, was a major provider of slaves to Iran and the rest of West Asia through northeastern Iran. The major part of slaves from Central Asia were Turkic, captured through raids, or sold by their families or as war prisoners by other Turkic tribes, and Turkic slaves came to be the most popular ethnicity for slaves in Iran.

A third slave route through northwestern via Azerbaijan and the Caucasus a came via the Kazars consisting of Turkish slaves, as well as non-Turkish peoples of the Caucasus and eastern Europeans such as the Alans, the Rūs, and the saqaliba (Europeans), in turn including Slavs and Finno-Ugrian peoples like the Burṭās or Mordvins; the slave trade from Caucasus (and the Black Sea slave trade) would also have included Greeks, Armenians and Georgians. The Muslim invasion of northern India also resulted in a slave route of Hindu Indians through warfare and slave raids.

The slaves were used in Iran itself, particular in the households of the Muslim governors, but Iran was also a great transfer area of the slave trade to the Abbasid Caliphate. The use of domestic slaves was of the kind common in Islamic regions. Enslaved women were used as concubines of the harems or female slaves to serve them, and male slaves were castrated to become eunuchs who guarded them, and black men were preferred as eunuchs because they were regarded to be unattractive. Slaves were also employed as entertainers and for secretarial and financial duties, as musicians, as soldiers, as tenders of farm animals and horses, and as domestics and cooks. There would also have been agricultural slave workers in Iran, but the information about them are insufficient.

=== Slavery under Mongol and Timurid rule (c. 1220–1502 AD) ===
Slaves were procured through warfare, slave raids, by purchase or as gifts.

Both male and female slaves were used for domestic service and sexual objects. The use of slaves for military service, ghilman, initially disappeared during the Mongol period, but it was revived and became important again during the reign of Ghazan (r. 1295–1304). Tamerlane "had as many as a thousand captives, who were skillful workmen, and laboured all the year round at making head pieces, and bows and arrows".

== Early modern Iran ==
=== Slavery in Safavid Iran (c. 1502–1736 AD) ===
Slavery was a common institution in Safavid Iran, with slaves employed in many levels of society. African slaves were imported by the East African slave trade across the Indian Ocean, and white slaves were mainly provided from the Caucasus area or the Caspian Sea through warfare and slave trade.

==== Slave trade ====
Slaves were procured through warfare, slave raids, by purchase or as gifts. Prisoners of war (asīr) could be ransomed but were otherwise enslaved, and rebellions and upheavals such as the Afghan occupation (1722–1730) resulted in the enslavement of thousands; in these cases, the usual custom of only enslaving people of a different religion were overlooked. Slave raids were conducted through which people were enslaved, and these were often directed toward Christians in the Caucasus region. Slaves were imported from East Africa as well as from India via the Indian Ocean slave trade.

Finally, slaves were given as gifts: until 1780, the Christian Armenians were forced to regularly provide girls and male youths as tributes to the Safavid ruler; the Shah also gave slaves away, as diplomatic gifts to foreign ambassadors and to the ulema. The same was also the case for Georgia, in which Eastern Georgia was under protection of Iran and was forced to provide regular slave tributes. This went on until 1783: in the 1783 Treaty of Georgievsk, Eastern Georgia was given protection from Russia instead of Iran, and the tributes of Georgian slave children were stopped.

==== Slave market ====
Male slaves were referred to as ḡolām (in Arabic lit. a youth) or zar-ḵarīd (lit. bought by gold) or if they were black as kākā sīāh, while female slaves were referred to as kanīz(ak). Male slaves were used for military services as ghilman, or castrated and used as eunuch servants, while female slaves were used as domestics or as concubines for sexual service. Both male and female slaves were employed by their masters as entertainers, dancing, playing music, serving and by giving sexual services by prostitution at private parties.

==== Safavid harem ====
One of the biggest slavery institutions in Safavid Iran was the royal Safavid harem and court. Shah Soltan Hossein's (r. 1694–1722) court has been estimated to include five thousand slaves; male and female, black and white, of which one hundred were black eunuchs. The monarchs of the Safavid dynasty preferred to procreate through slave concubines, which would neutralize potential ambitions from relatives and other in-laws and protect patrimony. The slave concubines (and later mothers) of the Shah's mainly consisted of enslaved Caucasian, Georgian and Armenian women, captured as war booty, bought at the slave market or received as gifts from local potentates. The slave concubines were sometimes forced to convert to Shia Islam upon entering the harem, and referred to as kaniz. Slave eunuchs performed various tasks in many levels of the harem as well as the general court. Eunuchs had offices in the general court, such as in the royal treasury and as the tutors and adoptive fathers of non-castrated slaves selected to be slave soldiers (ghilman), as well as inside the harem, and served as a channel between the secluded harem women and the outside court and world.

=== Slavery under Nader Shah and his successors (c. 1736–1796 AD) ===
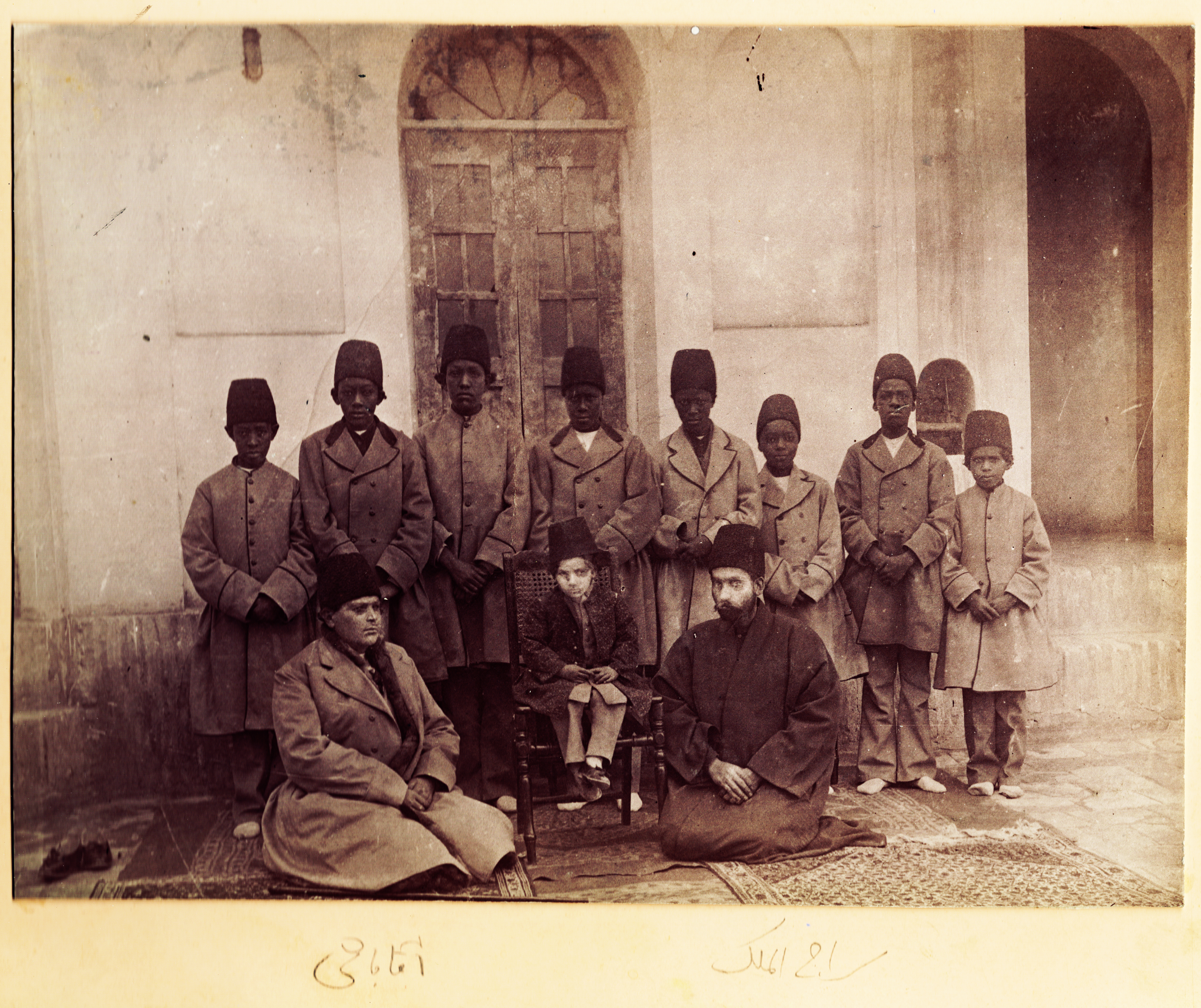
A Qajar-era aristocratic family with their slaves standing behind them

=== Slavery in Qajar Iran (c. 1796–1925 AD) ===
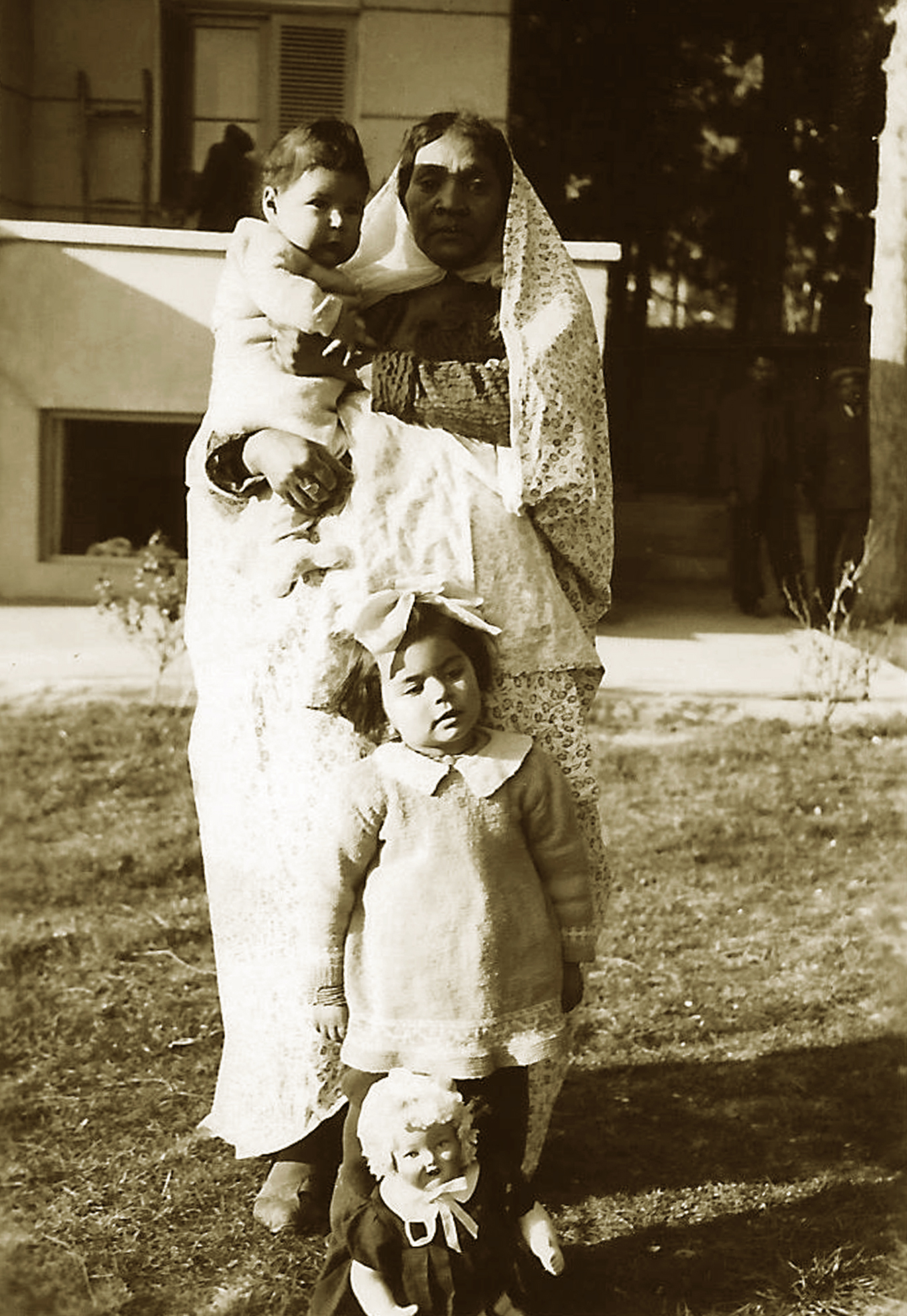
Kamran Afshar in the arms of his nanny, who had previously been a slave

==== Slave trade and supply ====
At the beginning of the 19th century both white and black, as well as indigenous, slaves were traded in Iran. Slaves were mainly obtained either through sale or warfare. Children were sometimes sold into slavery by their poor families, often in Armenia, Southern Iran and Kurdistan.

White slaves were mainly provided from the Caucasus area or the Caspian Sea through warfare and slave trade (mainly the Circassian slave trade). White slaves were often provided through warfare such as the Russo-Iranian wars, tribal incursions, slave raids and punitive expeditions in Caucasus and Northern Iran, which provided for Christian Armenian, Georgian and Circassians, and for Muslim Iranians capture in slave raids by the Turkmens.

Persians, Kurds, and Arabs bought Kazakh slaves who were falsely masqueraded as Kalmyks by slave dealers from the Khiva and Turkmens.

Inside Iran, non-Muslims, often Jewish women, were kidnapped from their homes, and Muslim tribespeople were kidnapped or taken as war prisoners during tribal warfare, often by Turkoman slave traders. Normally, white and light skinned slaves were used for concubinage, while black slaves were used domestics (maids, nannies and eunuchs). In southeast Iran, slave raids were conducted by slavers, often local chieftains, as late as around 1900. Muslim Iranian slaves were mainly sold to Arabia and Afghanistan, and it was said; "most of the slave girls employed as domestics in the houses of the gentry at Kandahar were brought from the outlying districts of Ghayn."

African slaves were provided from East Africa via the Indian Ocean slave trade, but also increasingly through the Persian Gulf by Arab and Persian traders, or by land by pilgrims returning from Mecca (Red Sea slave trade), which caused Iranian to call the slaves haji. Three categories of black slaves existed: "Bambassees, Nubees, and Habeshees." The origin of the term "Bambassee" being mispronunciation of "Mombassa," the port from which many of these slaves originated. The Nubees, or Nubians, were slaves from Nubia and were known for their darker complexion compared to Ethiopian slaves. The Habeshees were taken from the southern Abyssinian kingdom of Shoa engaged in conflicts with the Galla peoples along its borders, resulting in the capture of slaves. The trade routes stemming from these hostilities extended through Shoa, reaching the Red Sea coast at Roheita in the north and Tajura. Muslim Somalis actively participated in raiding Galla and Habesha groups, making significant contributions to the slave population, they utilized the ports of Zeila and Berbera for these endeavors. In contrast, slaves or supplies drawn by the northern Abyssinian Kingdom of Tigre were obtained through conflicts or wars with neighboring Gondar and Shoa, for its supply of slaves and primarily conducted its export trade through the port of Massowa.

Oromo slave-girls were also exported from the Somali coast to Persia during this time. It is estimated that during the 19th century, more than two thousand slaves were shipped annually from the northern Somali coast to the Persian Gulf. In 1873, Oromo slaves were reportedly being exported from Zeila to the Persian gulf, with the females costing around 75$. Oromo slaves were also exported to Persia from the southern Somali Banadir ports.

Shia Persians were seen as legitimate targets by Sunni Muslim Turkmens. Many were captured in Turkmen slave raids to villages of northwestern Iran. A notorious slave market for captured Persian slaves was the Khivan slave trade, centered in the Khanate of Khiva from the 17th to the 19th centuries.

==== Employment of slaves ====
As in previous times, slaves were used as eunuchs, domestic servants and concubines in the harems; as military men, administrative staff, or field laborers; it was considered a matter of status to have slaves in the household. Visiting Europeans could also have slaves in their household during their stay, however their slaves could leave any moment they wished with the claim that as Muslims, they were not compelled to serve Christians. Slaves owned by the Turkmen tribes were used to herd their flocks and till their land, and in southeast Iran slaves were almost exclusively held for agricultural labor. The British consul reported that "in Beluchistan there are several hamlets inhabited by slaves, who till the Government's property around Bampūr", and in Sīstān "the cultivators of the soil are, for the most part, Slaves both black and white."

The domestic slave pattern was similar in regard to the royal Qajar harem. The wives and slave concubines of shah Fath-Ali Shah Qajar came from the harems of the vanquished houses of Zand and Afshar; from the Georgian and Armenian campaigns; as well as from the slave markets, and presented as gifts to the shah from the provinces. The slave concubines of the harem were mainly white, dominantly Turkmen and Kurdish captives under the supervision of female chief called aqal (aḡūl). Slave boys below puberty (ḡolām-bačča) served as servants and playmates in the harem. Eunuchs were mainly African slaves. During the Qajar era, slave soldiers, ghilman, were used for the royal guard, and they were mainly white slaves from Caucasus. Female slaves (kaniz) had in some aspects more freedom than free Muslim women: being not viewed as respectable women they were allowed to move about alone in public outside of the sex segregation of the harem without a veil, and mingle with men in public places such as coffee houses, and were less harshly punished for an extramarital sexual relationship. Slaves were well-integrated into Iranian society. They intermarried with Persians, spoke Persian and adopted Islam. British traveler Ella Sykes wrote that Iran was the "Paradise" for slaves.

==== Decline ====
The 1828 war with Russia put an end to the import of white slaves from the Russian Empire borderlands as it undermined the trade in Circassians and Georgians, which both Iran and neighboring Turkey had been practicing for quite some time. When the number of white slaves diminished, free Iranian men were employed for the royal guards rather than the previous white ghilmans. At the same time and under various pressures, the British Empire decided to curb the slave trade through the Indian Ocean. "In 1848, Mohammad Shah Qajar banned the importation of slaves by sea." Consequently, by 1870 the trade in African slaves to Iran through the Indian Ocean had been significantly diminished. It is noted that the position of the formerly powerful eunuchs of the royal harem diminished in this period because of their decreasing numbers.

Although the diplomatic efforts of the Russians and the British did result in a decline in the trade, slavery was still common in Iran under the Qajar dynasty, and it was not until the first half of twentieth century that slavery would be officially abolished in Iran under Reza Shah Pahlavi. It is noted that poor parents still sold their children in to slavery, and that slave raids by chieftains were still conducted in the early 20th-century.

== Modern period ==
=== Abolition of slavery (1929) ===
What ultimately led to the abolition of the slave trade and the emancipation of slaves in Iran were internal pressures for reform. On 7 February 1929, the Iranian National Parliament ratified an anti-slavery bill that outlawed the slave trade or any other claim of ownership over human beings. The bill also empowered the government to take immediate action for the emancipation of all slaves.

Original text of Iranian Slavery Abolition Act of 1929 is as follows:

"Single Article" – In Iran, no one shall be recognized as slave and every slave will be emancipated upon arrival at Iran's territorial soil or waters. Every person who purchases or vends a human as slave or treats with a human in another ownership manner or acts as an intermediary in trading or transit of slaves, shall be sentenced to one to three years of correctional imprisonment. Indication – Having been informed about or referring of someone who has been subjected to trading or treatment as a slave, every official is obligated to provide him with means of liberation, immediately, and to inform the district court for guilt's prosecution.

The autobiography of a liberated slave who became an Iranian citizen, Mahboob Qirvanian, was published, with an English translation, in 2025.

== See also ==
- History of slavery in the Muslim world
- Slavery in 21st-century Islamism
- Slavery in modern Africa
- Slavery in antiquity
