= Jalal Dhiyab =

Iraqi civil rights activist (died 2013)

Jalal Dhiyab Thijeel (Arabic: جلال ذياب ثجيل; died 2013) was an Iraqi civil rights activist, politician, and Afro-Iraqi community leader. He entered politics after the 2003 invasion of Iraq, and founded the Free Iraqi Movement in 2007. He was assassinated in Basra on April 26, 2013, while he was a candidate for the provincial elections.

== Biography ==
Jalal Dhiyab founded the Free Iraqi Movement in 2007 as Iraqi civil society was evolving after the 2003 invasion. At that time, there had been no Afro-Iraqi in the entire government, whether a cabinet-level minister, member of parliament, or even in a municipal council. The group advocated for civil rights and government recognition of the community and anti-discrimination laws, also seeking constitutional rights, aiming to end the endemic discrimination which affected Afro-Iraqis for generations. Jalal Dhiyab had also taught his own courses on Afro-Iraqi history, including the Zanj rebellion, and also fostered a local hip-hop scene. He had portraits of Barack Obama and Martin Luther King Jr. in his classroom. The victory of Barack Obama in the 2008 election had been a major inspiration for Jalal Dhiyab to begin his political career. Eight candidates of the Free Iraqi Movement ran during the 2009 provincial elections, including Jalal Dhiyab. It was considered the debut of Afro-Iraqis into Iraqi politics, and he led them throughout it. He was also the first Afro-Iraqi activist to gain a national profile. While he was a candidate for the upcoming elections, Jalal Dhiyab was assassinated in Basra on April 26, 2013, and the murder remained unsolved and had weakened the movement. The investigation of his murder did not identify the perpetrators and portrayed it as just a criminal event. Additionally, one of the two candidates he supported for the provincial election was also targeted for assassination. He was assassinated after his movement had gained momentum after the election of Barack Obama, and his death pushed many Afro-Iraqis to downplay or minimize the role of racial identity in their lives. His assassination was most likely by political factions opposed to his attempt to run for office.
