= Afro-Emiratis =

Emiratis with African ancestry

الإماراتيون الأفارقة

Total population
- 3% or 5% of the population

Regions with significant populations
- United Arab Emirates

Languages
- Arabic (Emirati, Modern Standard), Achomi, Balochi, Swahili

Religion
- Islam (Sunni Islam, Shia Islam)

Related ethnic groups
- Emiratis, Ajam Emiratis, Afro-Arabs, Afro-Iranians, Afro-Omanis, Afro-Saudis

Afro-Emiratis (Standard Arabic: الإماراتيون الأفارقة; Emirati Arabic: خِدَّام), also known as African Emiratis and Black Emiratis, are Emiratis of full or partial Black African and Afro-Arab descent. They are mostly concentrated in the Northern Emirates. Despite their minority status within the broader Emirati population, they have a significant historical presence and cultural contribution, especially in sports and music.

Their ancestry can be traced back to individuals who were historically involved in trade and cultural exchanges between the Arabian Peninsula, Iran, and various regions of Africa. These populations include individuals who were brought to the region as slaves during the Indian Ocean slave trade era, as well as those who migrated to the UAE for trade, employment, or other purposes.

== History ==
The history of Afro-Emiratis dates back centuries, with evidence of trade and cultural interactions between the Arabian Peninsula and Africa existing since ancient times. Most Afro-Emiratis trace their roots to Zanzibari, East African, and Southern African slaves who were brought to the region during the Indian Ocean slave trade era. The UAE's proximity to the Omani, British, and Portuguese Empires and its involvement in maritime trade routes as well as the pearl diving industry played a significant role in shaping the presence of individuals of African descent in the region.

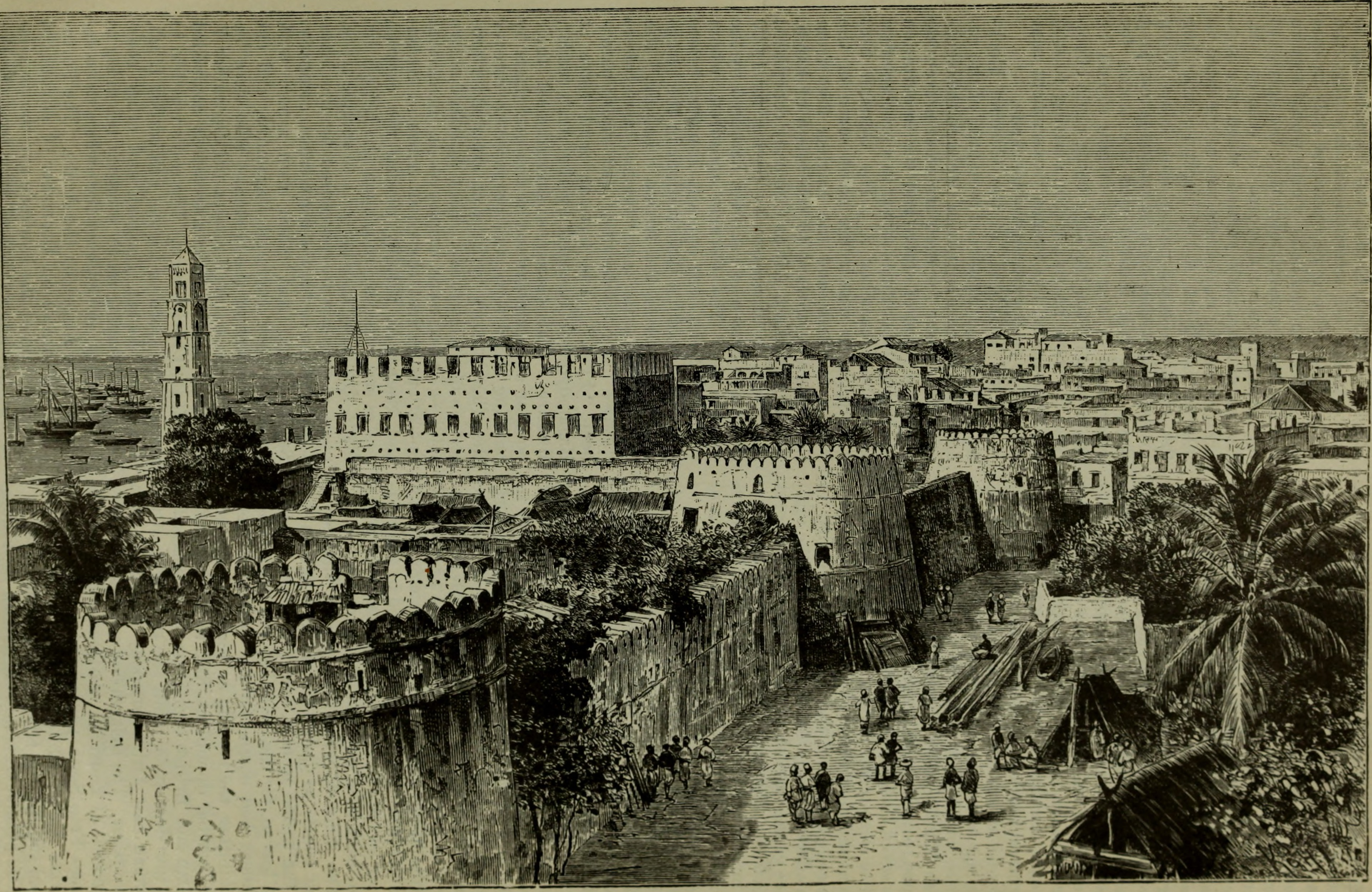
Zanzibar: A historic island in the Indian Ocean, significant in the context of Zanzibari migration and diaspora.

The period of decolonization between World War II and the 1970s brought significant changes, particularly regarding nationality laws. While some residents were incorporated as citizens, others found themselves marginalized due to perceived bloodlines that didn't fit into the imagined "national" communities of the newly formed states. Migration from Zanzibar to the UAE, notably Dubai and Abu Dhabi, saw a significant influx of Zanzibaris in 1964 following the Zanzibar Revolution. However, challenges arose in proving Arab lineage to be recognized as citizens, with some needing to trace their genealogies to specific Arab tribes. The categorization of Zanzibaris as Arabs was contested, with differing perspectives from British authorities, UNHCR, Abu Dhabi, and Dubai, impacting where they could reside and what rights they could have.

British authorities in the 1960s grappled with conflicting policies regarding Zanzibaris, oscillating between categorizing them as "people of the Gulf," beyond their jurisdiction, and as "foreigners," subject to British control. This ambiguity stemmed from concerns over pan-Arabism, prompting the British government to tighten controls on "illegal migration" through stricter residency permit and visa systems. However, Zanzibari's presence in Dubai and Abu Dhabi often challenged these regulations, leading to tensions during events like the "Middle East War" in the late 1960s, where demonstrations erupted, unsettling British advisors and local governments.

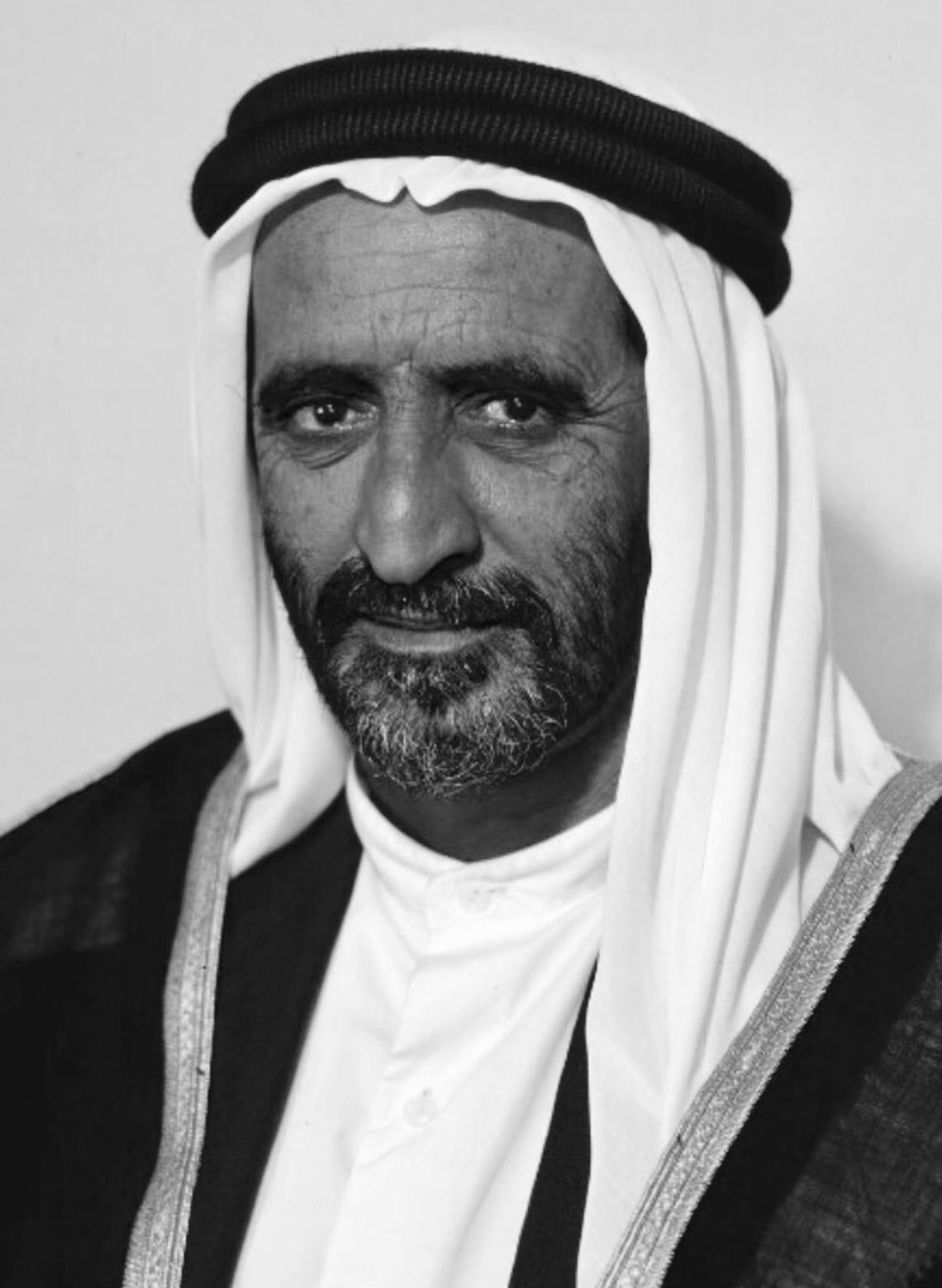
Sheikh Rashid bin Saeed Al Maktoum recognized Zanzibari-Emiratis as Arabs.

In 1969, amidst discussions of unification of the seven emirates, the Trucial Council considered including "Arabs of Omani origin" with tenure in the Emirates on the list of persons automatically recognized as citizens. However, this expansive inclusion was removed from the final version of the law. Meanwhile, Dubai Ruler Sheikh Rashid bin Saeed Al Maktoum attempted to integrate minorities by recognizing them as Arabs, mirroring efforts in the early 1970s by Sultan Qaboos to facilitate the integration of Zanzibaris.

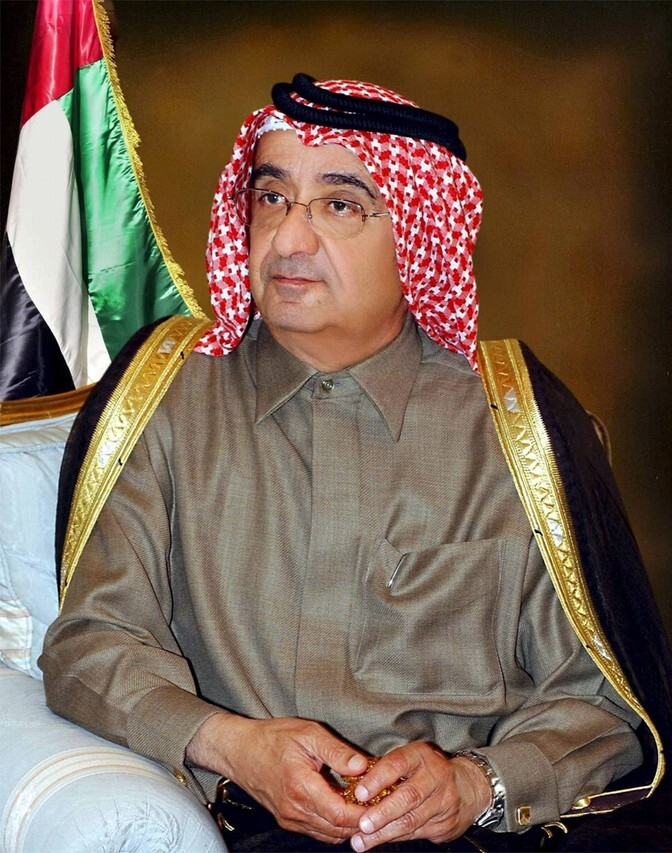
Sheikh Maktoum bin Rashid Al Maktoum issued naturalization decrees for Zanzibari-Emiratis.

However, Abu Dhabi's approach to citizenship was more stringent, focusing on Arab genealogy. Zanzibaris faced hurdles in gaining federal recognition of their citizenship claims, particularly from Abu Dhabi. Records from the Dubai Ruler's Court reveal efforts to document minorities as Arabs showing attempts to integrate Zanzibaris. Yet, Zanzibaris encountered challenges in obtaining citizenship uniformly across the UAE.

The Zanzibar Association, established in Dubai in 1964-65, aimed to represent Zanzibari interests and advance their inclusion in Dubai. Identity cards issued by the association were significant, granting Zanzibaris privileges not readily available to other migrants. However, bureaucratic processes and the issuance of Comoros passports reshaped their identity, distancing them from full incorporation into Emirati society.

In 1999-2000, Dubai Ruler Sheikh Maktoum bin Rashid Al Maktoum issued naturalization decrees for Zanzibaris, bringing them one step closer to UAE citizenship. However, by this time, most Zanzibaris had been in the UAE for over thirty years, suggesting their naturalization was handled differently from the provision allowing Arabs from the Gulf to naturalize after three years of residence. The federal government's issuance of Comoros passports to Zanzibaris further complicated their status, effectively re-categorizing them as "African" despite their cultural and linguistic assimilation as Emiratis.

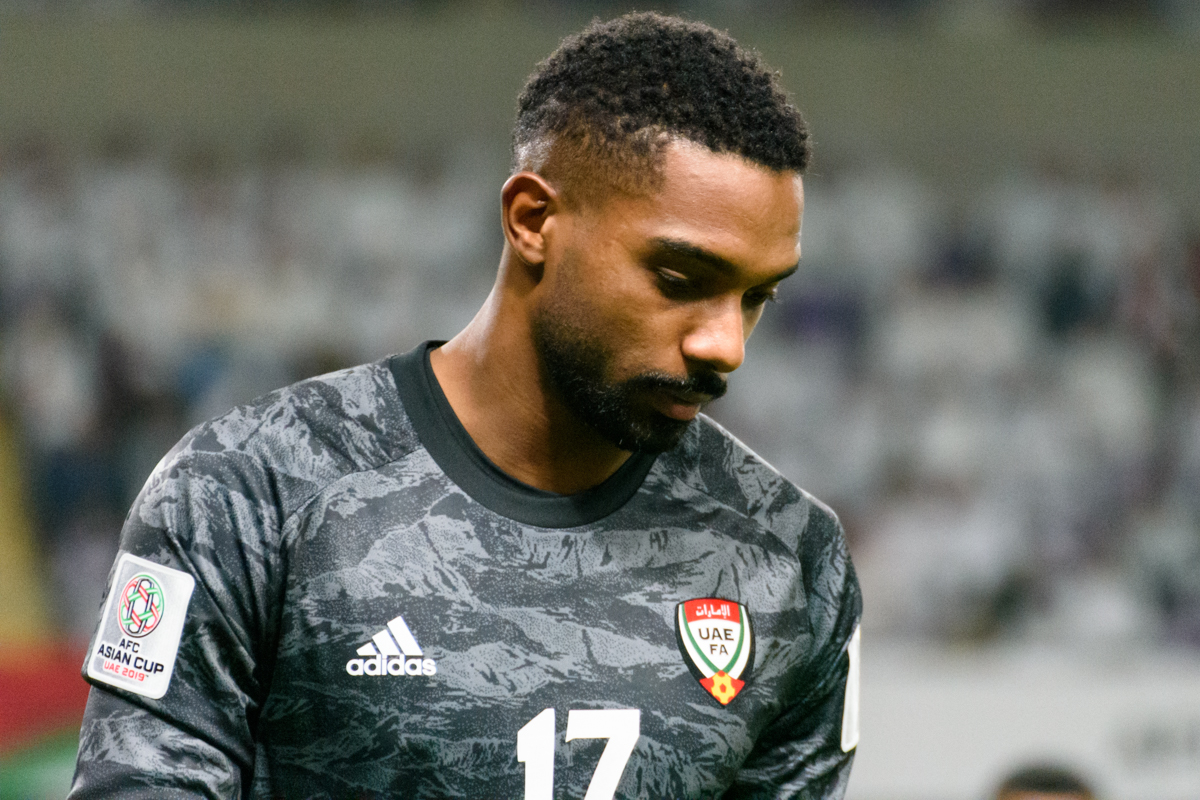
Khalid Eisa, goalkeeper for the UAE National Team.

== Cultural Traditions ==
Afro-Emiratis have introduced a number of cultural traditions to the UAE, including Liwa, Fann at-Tanbura, Bandari, and Nuban. These traditions are integral to Emirati culture. Despite facing social stigma and challenges related to racial identity and acceptance, Afro-Emiratis continue to celebrate and preserve their heritage.

Afro-Emiratis have a strong presence in Emirati sports.

== Identity and Inclusion ==
Afro-Emiratis, like other Emiratis, identify with the national identity of the UAE and the broader Arab identity. Historically, slaves were considered members of the tribes and families to which they belonged, and many were granted Emirati citizenship after the abolition of slavery. This occurred after independence in 1971, offering former slaves the opportunity to fully integrate into Emirati society. However, despite legal rights as Emirati citizens, Afro-Emiratis still face social challenges, including issues of racial identity and acceptance. Efforts to promote inclusivity and diversity are ongoing, but challenges persist, particularly in areas such as intermarriage and societal perceptions of an 'Emirati' identity.

Emirati tribes such as Al Hammadi, Al Darmaki, and Al Mazroui are said to be of East African origin.

== Language ==
Afro-Emiratis, like other Emiratis, predominantly speak various Arabic dialects, the official language of the UAE. Arabic serves as a unifying force, enabling communication and fostering a sense of belonging within the Emirati community. However, due to their diverse heritage, many Afro-Emiratis are also fluent in other languages, including Achomi, Balochi, Swahili, and English. While these languages hold significant cultural value for Afro-Emiratis, they face challenges in maintaining these linguistic traditions within younger generations. The forces of globalization and the homogenization of Emirati society towards a singular Emirati identity have contributed to the decline of these languages among Afro-Emirati youth.

== Slavery ==
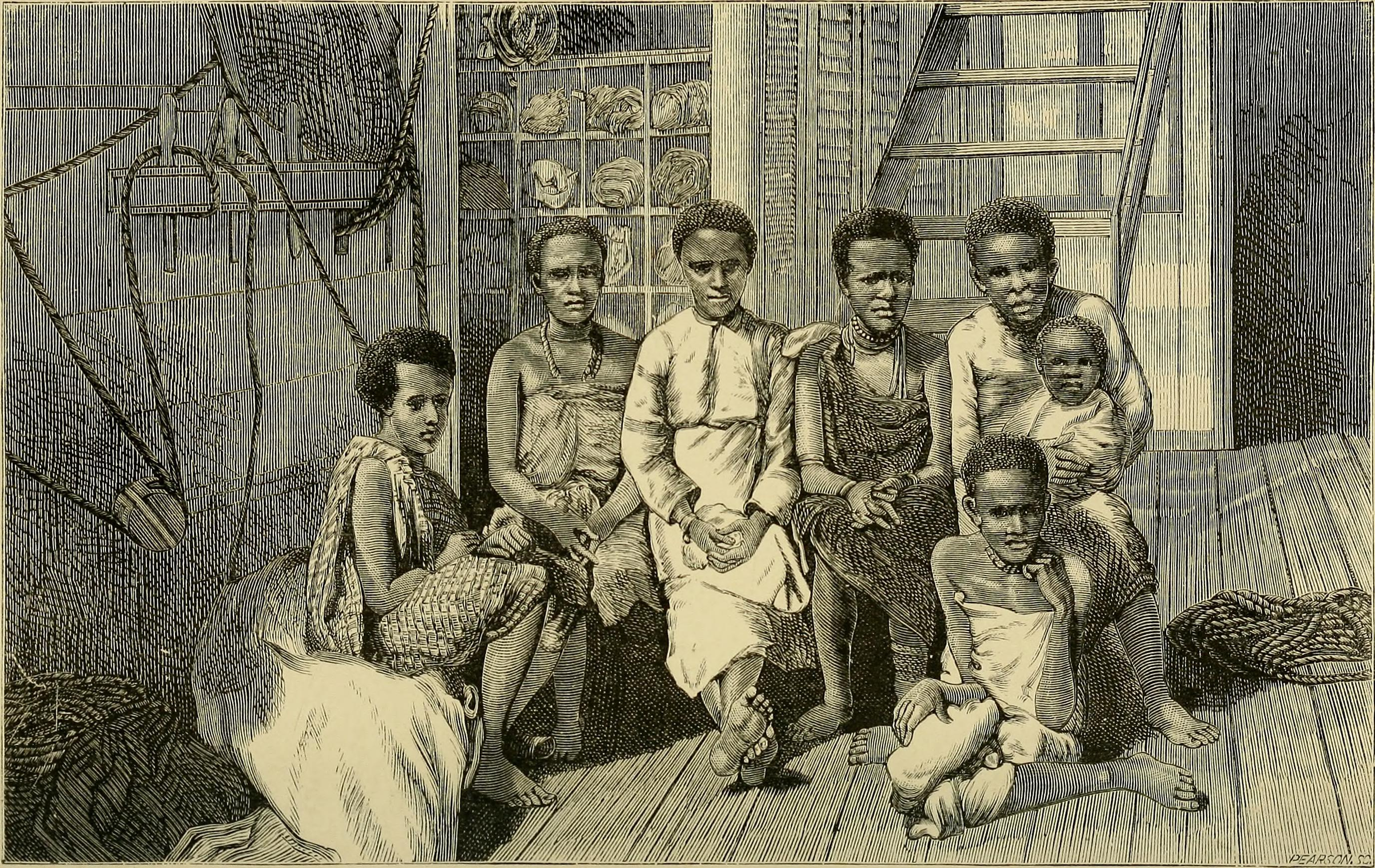
Slave-catching in the Indian Ocean (1873).

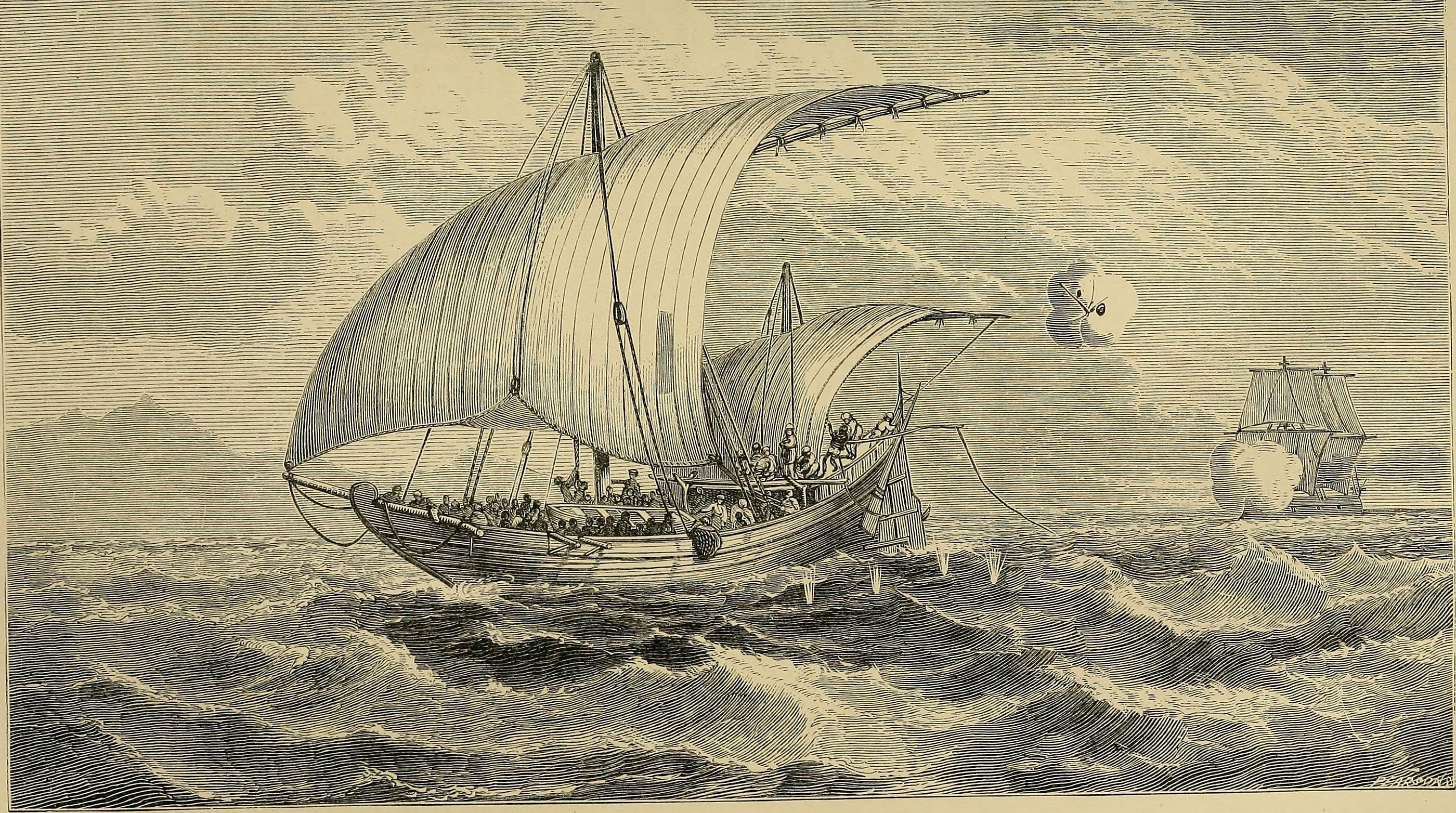
Slave-catching in the Indian Ocean (1873).

Slavery persisted in the Trucial States from 1892 until the formation of the United Arab Emirates (UAE) in 1971. The Trucial States comprised the sheikhdoms of Dubai, Abu Dhabi, Sharjah, Ajman, Kalba, Umm Al Quwain, Fujairah, and Ras Al Khaimah. Enslaved individuals, primarily sourced from the Indian Ocean slave trade, were trafficked to the region from various areas including the Indian subcontinent, the Hejaz, Oman, and Persia. They were employed in industries such as pearl fishing, domestic servitude, and the burgeoning oil industry. Many Afro-Arab individuals trace their heritage to these enslaved populations.

The exact date of abolition remains unclear. Some sources suggest it was in 1963, marked by an agreement signed by Trucial rulers, while others point to 1971 when the UAE joined the UN and accepted anti-slavery conventions. However, the absence of enforceable legislation cast doubt on the effectiveness of these measures. Following abolition, the Kafala system emerged, resembling aspects of the previous slave labor system, particularly in its exploitation of vulnerable workers from Africa and South Asia.

Throughout history, the British Empire's involvement in the region intersected with efforts to combat slavery. Despite treaties against the slave trade, the practice persisted, with British reports highlighting Dubai's role as a major hub for slave trafficking. The British administration in the Trucial States, while officially condemning slavery, struggled to enforce anti-slavery measures due to concerns over economic stability and political unrest.

Slavery routes into the Trucial States varied, with enslaved individuals trafficked from East Africa, the Persian Gulf, and South Asia. Slaves endured harsh conditions, serving as soldiers, laborers, pearl divers, and concubines. Female slaves faced particular exploitation, often subjected to sexual servitude and enduring high mortality rates. The British Empire faced mounting pressure from international bodies like the League of Nations and the United Nations to address the issue, leading to increased scrutiny and calls for abolition. After gaining independence in 1971, the UAE officially accepted international conventions prohibiting slavery and officially integrated former slaves into Emirati society.

== Notable people ==
Notable Emirati citizens identified as Afro-Emiratis, characterized by dark skin and coarse hair, regardless of their specific ancestry:

- Ahmed Barman — footballer
- Abdullah Idrees — footballer
- Mohamed Awadalla — footballer
- Junior Ndiaye — footballer
- Ali Salmeen — footballer
- Saeed Juma — footballer
- Khalid Eisa — footballer
- Fares Juma — footballer
- Ali Khaseif — footballer
- Ahmed Mallalah — footballer
- Majid Rashid — footballer
- Khalifa Al Hammadi — footballer
- Fahad Khamees — footballer
- Khamees Saad — footballer
- Ahmed Khalil — footballer
- Ismail Matar — footballer
- Hassan Hamza — footballer
- Ismail Al Hammadi — footballer
- Abdulaziz Haikal — footballer
- Yahya Al-Ghassani — footballer
- Tahnoon Al-Zaabi — footballer
- Salmin Khamis — footballer
- Jonas Naafo — footballer
- Abdulaziz Sanqour — footballer
- Hamdan Al Abri — Singer

== See also ==
- Afro-Arabs
