= Human trafficking in Iraq =

Iraq ratified the 2000 UN TIP Protocol in February 2009.

In 2010, Iraq was both a source and destination country for men, women, and children subjected to trafficking in persons, specifically forced prostitution and forced labor. Iraqi women and girls, some as young as 11 years old, were subjected to conditions of human trafficking within the country and in Egypt, Lebanon, Jordan, Bahrain, the United Arab Emirates, Turkey, Qatar, and possibly Saudi Arabia for forced prostitution and sexual exploitation within households.

In some cases, women were lured into forced sexual exploitation through false promises of work. The more prevalent means of human trafficking was through sale or forced marriage. Family members coerced girls and women into prostitution to escape desperate economic circumstances, to pay debts, or to resolve disputes between families. Some women and girls were trafficked within Iraq for the purpose of sexual exploitation through the traditional institution of temporary marriages (muta’a). Under this arrangement, the family receives a dowry from the husband and the marriage is terminated after a specified period. Iraqi males also took advantage of muta’a to traffic multiple women into other Iraqi provinces or neighboring countries, especially Syria, for the purposes of forced prostitution. Anecdotal reports tell of desperate Iraqi families abandoning their children at the Syrian border with the expectation that traffickers on the Syrian side will pick them up and arrange forged documents so the young women and girls can stay in Syria in exchange for working in a nightclub or brothel. The large population of internally displaced persons and refugees moving within Iraq and across its borders were particularly at risk of being trafficked.

In 2010 Iraq was a destination country for men and women who migrated from Syria, India, Indonesia, China, Yemen, Nigeria, Afghanistan, Pakistan, Palestine, Turkey, and Uganda and were subsequently subjected to conditions of forced labor as construction workers, security guards, cleaners, handymen, and domestic workers. Such men and women often reported their employers seized workers’ passports and official documents, refused to honor employment contracts, and made threats of deportation as a means to keep them in a situation of forced labor. Some governments ban their nationals from working in Iraq. These bans are not effective, however, as many migrating laborers and labor brokers circumvent the law. Some of these foreign migrants were recruited for work in other countries such as Jordan or the Arab states of the Persian Gulf but were forced or coerced to travel to Iraq, where their passports were confiscated and their wages withheld, ostensibly to repay labor brokers for the costs of recruitment, transport, and food and lodging. Other foreign migrants were aware they were destined for Iraq but once in-country, found the terms of employment were not what they expected or the jobs they were promised did not exist, and they faced coercion and serious harm, financial or otherwise, if they attempted to leave. In one case that came to light in 2009, 14 Ugandan women were subjected to forced labor in Iraq. These women were told they would work on U.S. military bases as domestic workers, although no U.S. contractors or subcontractors were involved in bringing them to Iraq. Upon arrival, the women were sent to work as domestic workers for private Iraqi families and received significantly lower wages. Some of the women were locked in rooms, had their passports stolen, and were physically or sexually abused by either the recruitment agent or the employer, practices potentially used to keep them in compelled service.

Some Iraqi boys from poor families were subjected to forced street begging and other nonconsensual labor exploitation and forced commercial sexual exploitation. Some women from Iran, Syria, Turkey, and the Philippines who migrated to the area under the jurisdiction of the Kurdistan Regional Government (KRG) experienced conditions of involuntary domestic servitude after being recruited with offers of different jobs. An Iraqi official revealed networks of women have been involved in the trafficking and sale of male and female children for the purposes of forced prostitution. There were reports some Iraqi boys were trafficked internally for the purpose of organ donation; Baghdad hospitals did not question the “voluntary” donation because often the father of the boy was present. There have been isolated cases of Iraqi border forces intercepting older men and young girls attempting to travel together out of Iraq using fake documents; NGOs contend these were cases of trafficking. Anecdotal evidence and media reports suggested some trafficking victims were taken from orphanages and other charitable institutions by employees of these organizations.

The Government of Iraq does not fully comply with the minimum standards for the elimination of trafficking; however, it is making significant efforts to do so in spite of resource and capability constraints. The Iraqi government continued to move its draft anti-trafficking bill through its legislative structures. Because the determination that Iraq is making significant efforts is based on indications of a commitment to take additional future steps over the next year, particularly the passage of the anti-trafficking law.

The U.S. State Department's Office to Monitor and Combat Trafficking in Persons placed the country in "Tier 2 Watchlist" in 2017 and 2023.

In 2023, the Organised Crime Index gave the country a score of 7.5 out of 10 for human trafficking, noting that porous borders and high levels of corruption limited the fight against this crime.

== Prosecution (2010) ==
The government made minimal progress in its anti-human trafficking law enforcement efforts over the past year. The 2005 Iraqi Constitution prohibits forced labor, slavery, slave trade, trafficking in women or children, and sex trade, though the Constitution does not prescribe specific punishments for these acts and it cannot be used to prosecute offenders. The Government of Iraq has not yet passed its anti-trafficking draft legislation; however, it is reported the legislation finally progressed through the Shura Council. Although no single law defines trafficking in persons or establishes it as a criminal offense, various provisions of Iraqi law apply to trafficking. During the last six months, the Iraqi government initiated both a criminal and a human rights investigation into an alleged labor trafficking crime, which resulted in the issuance of two arrest warrants. There were no mechanisms to collect data on offenses or enforcement. There was some evidence of complicity in trafficking by officials. An investigation of alleged trafficking involving the director of a women's shelter in the KRG area last year had not been completed at the time of this report.

== Protection (2010) ==
The Iraqi government demonstrated minimal efforts to ensure that victims of trafficking were given access to protective services during the reporting period. Iraq did not have formal procedures to identify victims of trafficking among vulnerable groups, such as women arrested for prostitution or foreign workers imported to Iraq by labor brokers, some of whom reportedly provided workers for U.S. government contractors and sub-contractors. The government did not fund even temporary shelters for trafficking victims, and did not show efforts to develop or implement procedures by which government officials systematically refer victims to organizations providing legal, medical, or psychological services. However, two ministries refer adult and juvenile detainees to medical screening if they report abuse; reports of abuse of juvenile detainees are investigated, although the results of these investigations are not known. All care is administered by NGOs, which run victim-care facilities and shelters accessible to victims of trafficking. Because coercion is not recognized in Iraqi courts as a legal defense for engaging in an unlawful act, women who have been coerced into prostitution have been prosecuted and convicted. Sex trafficking victims reportedly were prosecuted for prostitution and some spent several months in detention awaiting trial. In the few known cases of children who were forced into armed service, the child victims were prosecuted for terrorism offenses. Some child trafficking victims were placed in protective facilities, orphanages, and foster care, while others were placed in juvenile detention centers. Since trafficking is not established as a crime in Iraq, the government did not encourage victims to assist in investigations or prosecution. Foreign victims had no legal protection against removal to countries in which they may face hardship or retribution. Iraq did not assist foreign trafficking victims by providing temporary or permanent residency status or other relief from deportation. There was no victims’ restitution program. In August 2009, the Iraqi government assisted in the repatriation of the 14 Ugandan women subjected to forced labor in Iraq. Iraq did not provide any specialized training for government officials to identify trafficking victims. Furthermore, the government denied permission for an NGO to visit Baghdad's women's prison, where the NGO had previously identified trafficking victims among women detained for offenses committed as a result of being trafficked.

== Prevention (2010) ==
The Government of Iraq took minimal efforts to prevent trafficking in persons during the reporting period. The Ministry of Human Rights, working in tandem with the Ministry of Youth and Sports, initiated a public awareness campaign aimed at educating children at schools and youth centers across the country about trafficking. However, the government has not yet created an effective mechanism to disseminate awareness information to front-line law enforcement officers who are most likely to come into contact with trafficking victims. Law enforcement officials did not consistently screen people leaving or entering Iraq for evidence of trafficking, and the borders of Iraq remained generally unsecured. The Iraqi government had not taken steps to end the practice of forced marriages and curb the use of temporary marriages, which can result in situations of sexual and involuntary domestic servitude; and it had not regulated recruitment practices of foreign labor brokers to prevent practices facilitating forced labor. The Supreme Committee to Combat Human Trafficking, an inter-ministerial committee composed of members from the Ministries of Human Rights, Foreign Affairs, and Labor and Social Affairs, continued to serve as a coordinating body on human trafficking issues, though it wielded no special authority to implement its recommendations.

== See also ==
- Human rights in Iraq
- Slavery in Iraq
