= Slavery in Iraq =

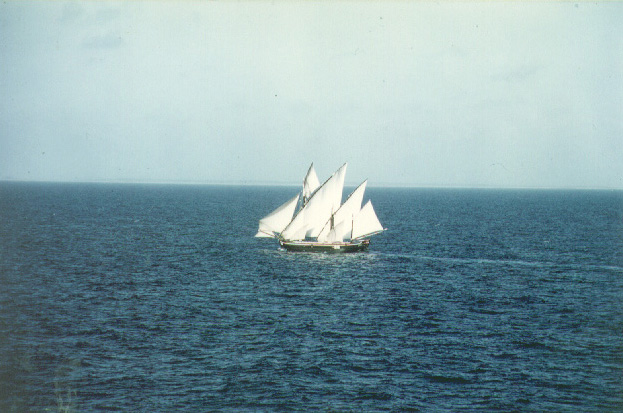
Dhows were used to transport goods and slaves.

Zanj Rebellion

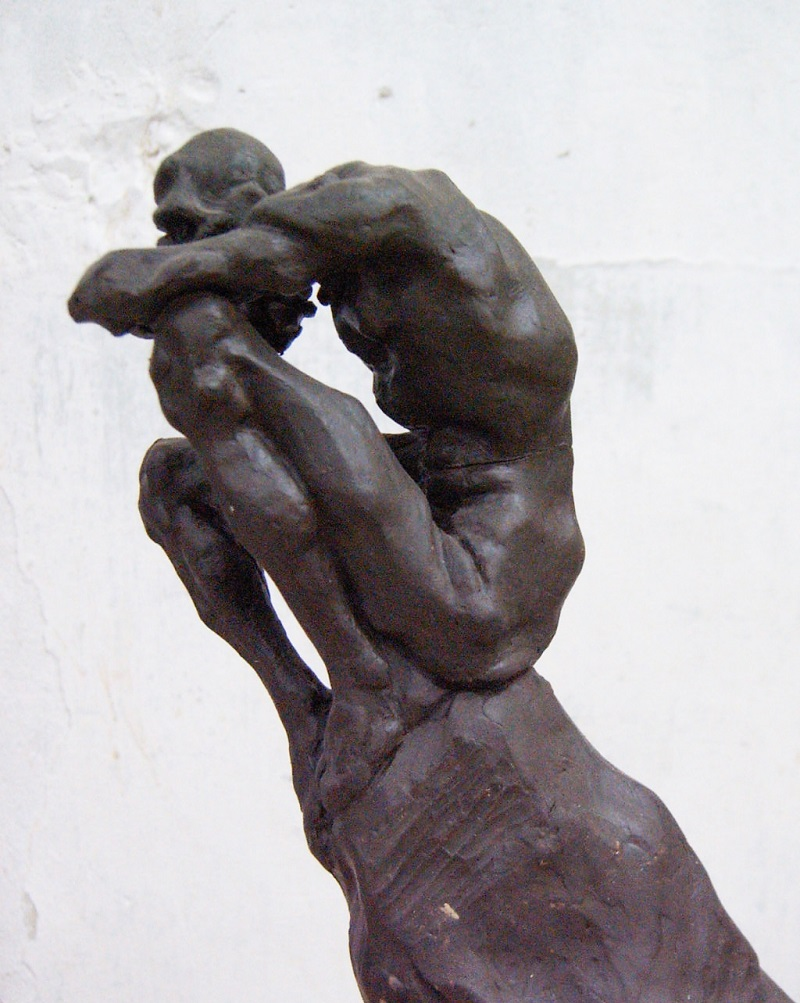
Zanj Rebellion - Thawrat al-Zanj - by Ahmad Barakizadeh

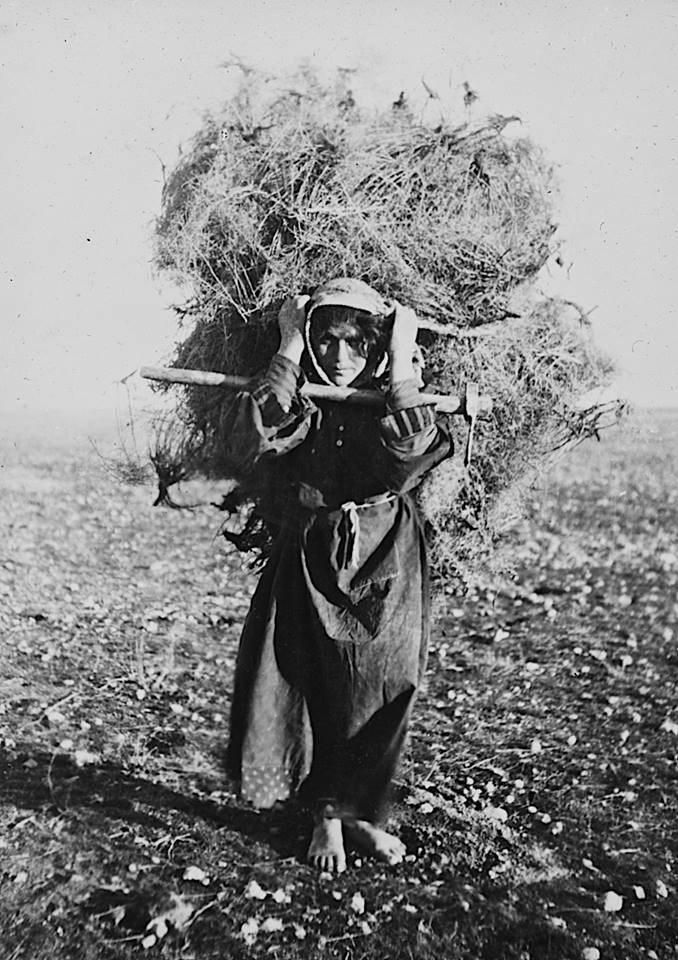
An Armenian woman in slavery after the genocide bears Thistles to fuel home.

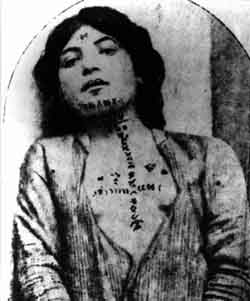
Armenian slaves

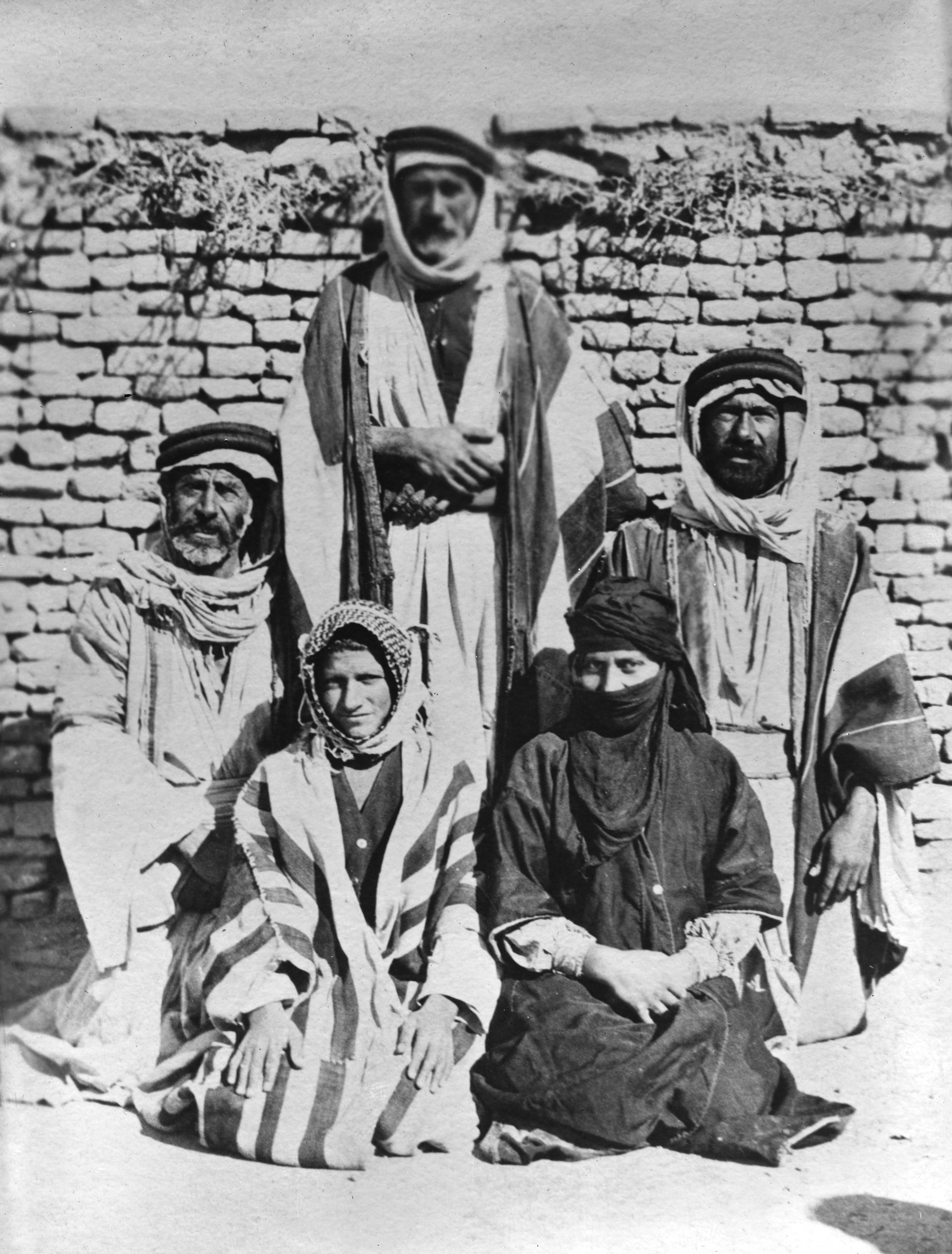
Islamized Armenians who were "rescued from Arabs" after the war

Slavery existed in the territory of the modern state of Iraq until the 1920s.

When the area later to become the modern state of Iraq was a center of the Abbasid Caliphate (750–1258), the area was a major slave trade destination, and slaves were imported to Iraq from the North along the Volga trade route, from the West via the Red Sea slave trade, and from the South from the Indian Ocean slave trade. The slave trade to, and slavery in the area continued during subsequent rulerships, and Ottoman Iraq (1534–1920) remained a destination of the international slave trade in the Middle East.

Under the First World War, Ottoman Iraq came under rulership of the British, who disliked slavery. Slavery was formally abolished in Iraq in 1924. Iraq was the first Gulf state, in which slavery was banned. Many members of the Afro-Iraqi minority are descendants of the former slaves.

In the 21st-century, Islamic terrorists again practiced slavery in areas under their control in Syria and Iraq.

== History ==
Historically, the institution of slavery in the region of the later Iraq was reflected in the institution of slavery in the Rashidun Caliphate (632–661) slavery in the Umayyad Caliphate (661–750), and slavery in the Abbasid Caliphate (750–1258).

=== Abbasid Caliphate (750–1258) ===
Iraq was the center of the Abbasid Caliphate, where slavery played a major part. The slave trade had been big also during the Umayyad Caliphate, but then, it had been fueled by war captives and people enslaved as tax levy, but during the Abbasid Caliphate the slave trade was supplanted by people bought through commercial slave trade provided for the slave markets in Basra, Baghdad and Samarra.

Slaves were transported in the 9th-century from the Red Sea slave trade to Jeddah, Mecca and Medina, and by caravan over the desert to Baghdad; as well as via the Indian Ocean slave trade by boat through the Persian Gulf to Ras al Khymah, Dubai, Bandrar Abbas, Bushine and Basra.

Female slaves were primarily used as either domestic servants, or as concubines (sex slaves), while male slaves were used in a number of tasks. The slave trade in the Muslim world focused on women for used of domestic servants and sex slaves. Women were trafficked to the royal Abbasid harem from Europe via the Volga trade route, as well as from Africa and Asia. Contemporary writers in the late 9th-century estimated that there were around 300,000 slaves in Iraq. The harsh condition resulted in a big slave rebellion known as the Zanj Rebellion, which lasted between 869 and 883. Thousands and possibly millions of Africans, Berbers, Turks, and Europeans from Northeastern Europe (saqaliba) are estimated to have been enslaved in this time period.

=== Ottoman Iraq (1534–1920) ===
During the early modern period, the territory of modern Iraq, Mesopotamia, was a battle ground dominated first by the Aq Qoyunlu, the Safavid Iran and finally the Ottoman Empire, with an interruption of the Mamluk dynasty (1704–1831). Slaves were imported to the area from East Africa and the Indian Ocean slave trade via the Persian Gulf to the ancient slava market of Basra. A smaller slave trade in Europeans where imported from the North. At the very end of Ottoman rule, the enslavement of the Armenians took place.

==== Slave trade ====
In the Ottoman period, slaves where imported to Mesopotamia via several routes. African slaves where trafficked to the area from Central Africa via the Red Sea slave trade across the desert from Mecka and Medina by Hajj pilgrims. Another route of African slaves came via the Indian Ocean slave trade and the Persian Gulf to the port of Basra. White slaves where imported from the Black Sea region in the North; first via the Crimean slave trade and then by the Circassian slave trade.

During the 19th-century, the slave route from Africa to Ottoman Iraq from the East coast of Africa via the Indian Ocean slave trade and the Red Sea slave trade via the Persian Gulf and by caravans over the desert respectively.

Officially, the import of slaves via the Persian Gulf was prohibited by the Suppression of the slave trade in the Persian Gulf in January 1847. This was however a nominal prohibition, and the slave trade continued. In 1847, the British consulate in Baghdad reported:

The average import of slaves into Bussorah is 2000 head - in some years the numbers have reached 3000, but for the year 1836, owing, it is supposed, to the discouragement which the traffic has sustained from the iman of Muscat, no more than 1000 slaves were imported. [...] Of the slaves imported, one half is usually sent to the Muntefick town on the Euphrates, named Sook-ess-Shookh, from whence they are pread all over Southern Mesopotamia, and Eastern Syria; a quarter are exported directly to Baghdad and the remainder are disposed of in the Bussorah Market.

During the Armenian genocide in 1915–1923, many Armenians, primarily women, girls and boys under the age of twelve, were enslaved by Muslims in Ottoman Syria and Iraq. Armenian girls and children were sold from Syria to harems and brothels in Ottoman Iraq, such as Baghdad.

==== Function and conditions ====
Female slaves were primarily used as either domestic servants, or as concubines (sex slaves), while male slaves were used in a number of tasks.

Slaves in Islam were mainly directed at the service sector – concubines and cooks, porters and soldiers – with slavery itself primarily a form of consumption rather than a factor of production. The most telling evidence for this is found in the gender ratio; among slaves traded in Islamic empire across the centuries, there were roughly two females to every male. Outside of explicit sexual slavery, most female slaves had domestic occupations. Often, this also included sexual relations with their masters – a lawful motive for their purchase and the most common one.

== Activism against slave trade ==
After the British occupation of Ottoman Baghdad during World War I in 1917, the British liberated 80 enslaved Armenian girls from Muslim households, and in 1919, the British reported that there were around 1000 Armenians in Baghdad and that their number increased all the time when more enslaved Armenian girls and children were liberated from various Arab households and villages.

After the truce, the Ottoman government in Constantinople ordered the local governors in the Ottoman Empire to localise (enslaved) Christian women and children and hand them over to Christian bodies. Egyptian Armenians organized squads to rescue enslaved Armenians from Bedouins in Syria and Mesopotamia (Iraq); one of these, led by Rupen Herian, reported that they had liberated 533 enslaved women and children between June and August 1919.

Several actors, among them the League of Nations, the British Friends of Armenia, the Syrian Armenian Relief Society and Karen Jeppe, worked to ensure the liberation of the enslaved Armenians, some of them active as late as in the 1930s. In her report to the League of Nations in Geneva in May 1927, Karen Jeppe stated that 1600 enslaved Armenians had been liberated from slavery in a five-year period, foremost from Syria; however, many thousands of Armenians remained in slavery.

=== Abolition ===
In 1921, former Ottoman Iraq was transformed in to the Kingdom of Iraq under British protection. The new Iraqi ruler was thus dependent upon support from the British, who disliked slavery. The British Empire, having signed the 1926 Slavery Convention as a member of the League of Nations, was obliged to investigate, report and fight slavery and slave trade in all land under direct or indirect control of the British Empire.

Slavery was formally banned in Iraq in 1924, by royal decree issued by king Faisal I of Iraq.

Many members of the Afro-Iraqi minority are descendants of the former slaves. They are subjected to racial discrimination with reference to the slavery of the past.

== 21st-century ==
For the revival of slavery in territories in Iraq and Syria occupied by the Islamic State in the 21st-century, see Slavery in 21st-century jihadism and Genocide of Yazidis by the Islamic State#Sexual slavery and reproductive violence.

== See also ==
- That Most Precious Merchandise: The Mediterranean Trade in Black Sea Slaves, 1260-1500
- Afro-Iraqis
- Rape during the Armenian genocide
- Human trafficking in Iraq
- History of slavery in the Muslim world
- History of concubinage in the Muslim world
- Medieval Arab attitudes to Black people
- Xenophobia and racism in the Middle East
- Racism in the Arab world
- Human trafficking in the Middle East
- Racism in Muslim communities
- Slavery in 21st-century jihadism

== Referenced material ==
- Segal, Ronald (2001). Islam's Black Slaves: The Other Black Diaspora. New York: Farrar, Straus and Giroux. ISBN 9780374527976.
