= Ibtisam Lutfi =

- Birth name: Khayriyyah Qurban
- Born: 1950
- Origin: Ta'if, Saudi Arabia
- Genres: Arab classical music
- Occupation: Singer-songwriter
- Instrument: Oud
- Years active: 1960s – mid-1980s

Ibtisam Lutfi (Arabic: ابتسام لطفي, born 1950) is a blind Saudi singer. She was born Khayriyyah Qurban (Arabic: خيرية قربان) in Ta'if in Saudi Arabia, and is one of the first female singers of the country. She began her career singing at wedding feasts in the city of Jeddah in the 1960s, and over the next two decades became famous in her native country as well as in Egypt. In a phone call with Al Arabiya channel in November 2013, she confirmed that she would be returning to her singing career.
