= Afro-Iraqis =

Iraqi people of African Zanj heritage

عراقيون أفارقة

Total population
- 150,000–500,000 (estimated 3% of total population)

Regions with significant populations
- Basra, Maysan, Dhi Qar

Languages
- Arabic; Swahili (L2 minority)

Religion
- Shia Islam

Related ethnic groups
- Black Africans, Bantu peoples, Afro-Jordanians, Afro-Palestinians, Afro-Syrians, Afro-Saudis, Al-Akhdam, Afro-Omanis, Afro-Iranians

Afro-Iraqis are Iraqi people of African Zanj heritage. Historically, their population has been concentrated in the southern port city of Basra, as Basra was the capital of the slave trade in Iraq. Afro-Iraqis speak Arabic and mostly adhere to Islam. Some Afro-Iraqis can still speak Swahili along with Arabic.

Afro-Iraqi leaders claim that there are roughly between 500,000 and 1,500,000 Afro-Iraqis, however this is not verified by official figures. Their origins date back to the time of the Arab slave trade and slavery in Iraq between the 9th century AD to the 19th century AD.

Many are from the district of Zubair, descendants of the people who came to Iraq from East Africa. Some came as sailors, whereas others came as traders, immigrants, religious scholars, or enslaved people over the course of many centuries, beginning in the 9th century CE.

== History and origin ==
However Black Iraqis are the descendants of East African coastal Bantu peoples, likely the Swahili people, who were enslaved and brought to Iraq in the 9th century during the Arab slave trade to slavery in the Abbasid Caliphate to work on agricultural fields or as laborers. Although some African migrants came to Iraq as sailors and laborers the majority were brought as slaves in the 9th century. Chattel slavery continued for a thousand years, and African slaves were still trafficked to Ottoman Iraq in the 19th-century, being a part of slavery in the Ottoman Empire.

Officially, the import of slaves via the Indian Ocean slave trade of the Persian Gulf was prohibited by the Suppression of the slave trade in the Persian Gulf in January 1847. This was however a nominal prohibition, and the slave trade continued. Slavery in Iraq was formally banned in 1924, by royal decree issued by king Faisal I of Iraq.

== Social condition ==
The Arab Muslim institution of slavery allowed enslaved people to own land, and enslavement was not generally hereditary. Conversion to Islam sometimes enabled enslaved people to escape their condition. Skin color played a distinctive role even amongst slaves, however, and discrimination based on skin colour existed, and continues to be a problem in Iraqi society. Today, many Afro-Iraqis activists report that they are denied job opportunities on the basis of their skin colour and ethnic background. Afro-Iraqis are well known as street musicians, as they historically experienced employment discrimination. Afro-Iraqis are also frequently called "Abeed", a pejorative meaning "slave" in Arabic.

== Heritage ==
Most Afro-Iraqis still are able to maintain rituals related to healing that are of Zanj origin. The languages used in these rituals are Swahili and Arabic. Percussion instruments such as drums and tambourines are used in these ceremonies. Songs such as Dawa Dawa are in a syncretic mixture of Arabic and Swahili. The song, which is about curing people of illness, is used in the shtanga ceremony, for physical health. Another ceremony, called nouba, takes its name from the Arabic word for paroxysm or shift, as Sophi performers take turns at chanting and dancing to ritualistic hymns. There are also unique ceremonies to remember the dead and for occasions such as weddings. Although the vast majority of Afro-Iraqis are Muslim, a shrinking minority still practices these traditions. Few Afro-Iraqis can still speak Swahili.

== Notable Afro-Iraqis ==
- Randa Abd Al-Aziz – Iraqi journalist and news anchor.
- Abbas Al Harbi – Australian theatre and film director, screenwriter, playwright
- Dr. Thawra Yousif – deputy director of Lotus Cultural Women’s League
- Jalal Diab – activist who was assassinated in 2013
- Qusay Munir - professional footballer, 2007 Asian Cup winner.
- Bilal Al-Shami - Actor and Singer

== See also ==
- Afro-Arab
- Afro-Iranians
- Afro-Turks
- Afro-Palestinians
- Arab slave trade
- Afro-Saudis
- Swahili people
- Zanj
- Zanj Empire
- Slavery in Iraq
- Abdulrahman, Khair al-Din (2017). "السماح.. رقص التسامي الجمعي، أرواحاً وأجساداً". Albahethon.
- Abu-Amero KK, et al. (2007). "Eurasian and African mitochondrial DNA influences in the Saudi Arabian population". BMC Evolutionary Biology. 7: 32. doi:10.1186/1471-2148-7-32. PMC 1810519. PMID 17331239.
- Achilli A, et al. (2007). "Mitochondrial DNA variation of modern Tuscans supports the near eastern origin of Etruscans". American Journal of Human Genetics. 80 (4): 759–68. doi:10.1086/512822. PMC 1852723. PMID 17357081.
- Al Arabiya (2008). "Descendants of Iraq's black rebels back Obama".
- Eastwood, Emma (2013). "MRG condemns killing of Black Iraqi leader in Basra, calls for full investigation into his death". Minority Rights Group International. Archived from the original on 2013-06-12. "Black or African Iraqis, who number between 1.5 and 2 million, are believed to have first migrated from East Africa to Iraq after the birth of Islam."
- Mamouri, Ali (2013-06-26). "Black Iraqis Struggle to Shake Legacy of Racism". Archived from the original on 2013-06-28. "It is noteworthy that their marginalization persists although they exceed about 1.5 million, according to the Free Iraqi Movement Vice President Salah Ruhais Salman, or 2 million, according to a statement made by the secretary-general of the movement, Abdel Hussein Abdel Razzak."
- Zurutuza, Karlos (2011). "To Be Black in Iraq". Inter Press Service. Basra. "Salah Ruhais Salman, vice-president of the Iraqi Freedom Movement, a political party established to defend the rights of Iraqis of African descent ... [says] "There are around 1.5 million of us in Iraq but none of us occupies any position in the Iraqi administration.""
- The Washington Post (2004). "A Legacy Hidden in Plain Sight". The Washington Post.
