= Bashaer Hawsawi =

Saudi Arabian visual artist and designer

- بشائر هوساوي
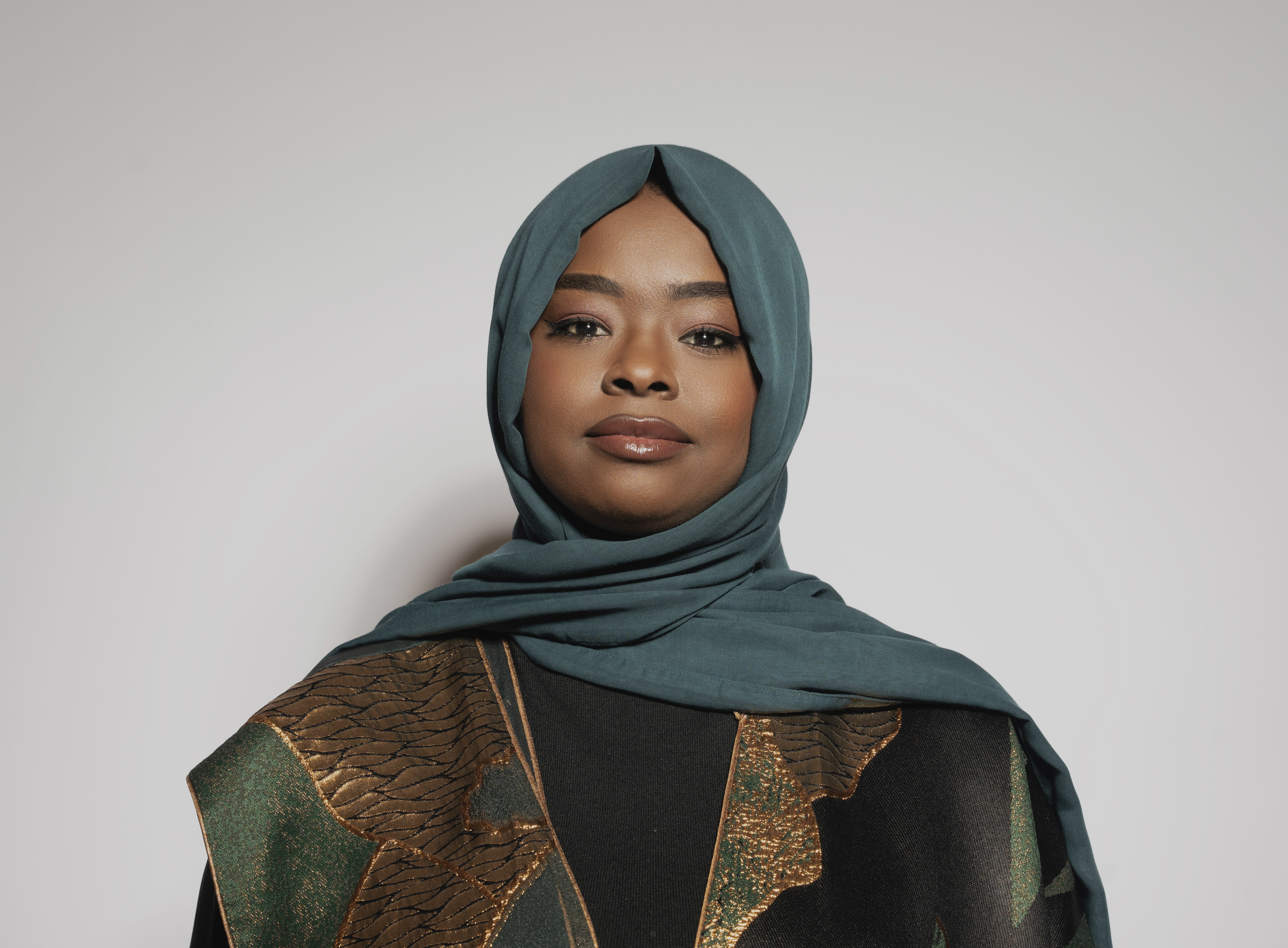
- Saudi contemporary visual artist Bashaer Hawsawi
- Born: 1992 (age 33–34); Jeddah, Saudi Arabia
- Education: King Abdulaziz University (BFA, 2015)
- Known for: Installation art, mixed media, found objects, visual art
- Notable work: Early Ripening (2022), Cleansing (2022), Qanfager series, Let's Play Well (2023)
- Awards: Misk Art Residency (2021)
- Website: bashaerhawsawi.com

Bashaer Hawsawi (بشائر هوساوي; born 1992) is a contemporary Saudi Arabian visual artist and designer based in Jeddah. She is best known for her conceptual installations and mixed-media works that utilize found objects to explore themes of cultural identity, family customs, nostalgia, and memory. Hawsawi's practice bridges traditional heritage and modern transformation within the expanding Saudi contemporary art movement.

== Early life and education ==
Hawsawi was born in 1992 in the coastal city of Jeddah, Saudi Arabia. Her early visual memory was profoundly shaped by her parents' daily routines and livelihoods. Her father ran a store collecting and selling eclectic goods, which instilled in her a lifelong curiosity about objects and materials, while watching her mother engage in traditional culinary practices—such as pickling and drying fruits—developed her appreciation for patience and organic processes.

Hawsawi pursued formal artistic training at King Abdulaziz University in Jeddah, graduating with a Bachelor of Fine Arts (BFA) in Sculpture and Ceramics in 2015. In her own account of the period, she has described starting out with no art community around her, working alone from her bedroom before gradually finding her footing in the field. She took part in early group exhibitions in Jeddah while still establishing her practice, including the 2017 exhibition Ebda'at 3 at Nesma Art Gallery, which featured fifty Saudi women artists.

== Artistic philosophy and materials ==
Hawsawi's creative practice is grounded in continuous research and experimenting with "practicing art as practicing life." She works extensively with mixed media and found objects, sourcing materials directly from her immediate environment. In an interview with the pan-Arab newspaper Asharq Al-Awsat, Hawsawi described conducting extensive field research before beginning a project, including visiting fabric markets in Jeddah's historic Al-Balad district to source wax-printed cottons from India, Africa, and China for her work.

Key elements in her art include:

- Ordinary household objects: She recontextualizes items like red plastic street brooms and domestic utensils to question societal ideas of cleanliness, physical labor, and the spiritual purification of the self. In Cleansing (2022), she has linked the broom motif to her own family's history as mutawwifin—guides who traditionally assist pilgrims during the Hajj—drawing a connection between physical and spiritual cleansing.
- Biomaterials and textures: Works such as her Qanfager series use papyrus to reflect on the historical vessel of knowledge, the passage of time, and the organic life cycles of nature.
- Stones and construction debris: In her installation The Magic of Memory, she combined stones salvaged from her family's demolished home in Jeddah with newly bought stones to examine the emotional weight of urban demolition, displacement, and personal instability.

== Career and exhibitions ==
Bashaer Hawsawi transitioned to full-time art practice after participating in key regional residencies, most notably the Misk Art Residency, which she has credited with maturing her critical thinking and artistic voice. In a video profile produced by the Misk Foundation's editorial platform Misk Hub, Hawsawi discussed how the institute's residency program helped develop and mature her artistic output and expand its reach locally and internationally. She has also received grants and support from the Misk Art Institute, Hayy Jameel, and the Saudi Ministry of Culture.

- 2017: Participated in Ebda'at 3, a group exhibition of fifty Saudi women artists at Nesma Art Gallery, Jeddah.
- 2018: Participated in the group exhibition MNWR مَنوَر at Hafez Gallery, Jeddah.
- 2019: Exhibited with Hafez Gallery at Shara 2019 and in "Galleries at MAS," both presented by Hafez Gallery.
- 2020: Work shown at Intersect Aspen Art + Design with Hafez Gallery.
- 2021: Selected for the prestigious Misk Art Residency in Riyadh. During this period, she produced her papyrus collage series Qanfager.
- 2022: Gained widespread recognition for her public art installation Early Ripening at Wadi Hanifa during the Noor Riyadh festival. She also presented Cleansing, profiled by Asharq Al-Awsat as a meditation on purification drawn from her family's history in the Hajj trade. Additionally, she participated in the "Next Wave" group exhibition at the Berlin Art Institute and presented work with Hafez Gallery at the 1-54 Contemporary African Art Fair in New York.
- 2023: Created Let's Play Well for Noor Riyadh, a light installation inspired by 1990s fiber-optic lamps that invited viewers to reflect on childhood innocence. She also exhibited in "The Mountains Quiver in Anticipation" at Hayy Jameel and presented work with Hafez Gallery at Art Dubai and the Jeddah Art Fair.
- 2024: Exhibited works with Hafez Gallery at Abu Dhabi Art and "Eye of the Collector" in London, capturing international attention for her tactile, conceptual fabric installations.
- 2025: Presented her first milestone solo exhibition, titled "Homes of Memory," at Hafez Gallery in Jeddah, exploring the emotional landscapes of domestic spaces through textiles and ceramics. Hafez Gallery also presented her work at "Foundations 2025."
- 2025–2026: Invited to contribute to Ithra's major design-led tribute to the date palm, titled Baseqat, in Dhahran. Her featured works positioned local botanical heritage in a wider conversation about sustainability. In October 2025, she was one of ten designers, artists, and craftspeople from Saudi Arabia, the UAE, Bahrain, Chile, and South Korea selected for Ithra's 12-day Khoos Residency in Dhahran and Al-Ahsa, which explored palm-frond weaving (khoos) as a medium for cross-cultural exchange and contemporary design under the guidance of architect and designer Abeer Seikaly. Reflecting on the residency, Hawsawi said the craft "dissolves barriers between cultures and calls on everyone to speak a shared language—the language of the hand, of patience, and of memory."

== Notable works ==
=== Early Ripening (2022) ===
Commissioned for the Noor Riyadh festival and installed in the natural landscape of Wadi Hanifa, this site-specific public sculpture features oversized, glowing fiberglass lemons in various hues. The variation in color represents the progressive stages of dehydration and preservation, inviting viewers to slow down in contrast to the modern urge for instant success.

=== Cleansing (2022) ===
An installation built around the red plastic street broom, a ubiquitous cleaning tool in Jeddah. Hawsawi has connected the work to her family's role as mutawwifin serving pilgrims arriving in Makkah for the Hajj, drawing a parallel between the everyday, repetitive act of street cleaning and the notion of spiritual cleansing central to the pilgrimage.

=== Qanfager series ===
An ongoing mixed-media series examining preservation and historical erasure. Qanfager (an ancient Arabic term for papyrus) utilizes layered papyrus colored with varying intensities of ink to evoke a feeling of ancient archiving and the layering of memory. Hawsawi has said the material's historic role as a vessel for records meant to be preserved and passed down informs her use of it as a metaphor for memory.

== See also ==
- Saudi Arabian art
- Noor Riyadh
- Misk Art Institute
