= Randa Abd Al-Aziz =

Iraqi news anchor

Randa Abd Al-Aziz (Arabic: رندا عبد العزيز; born c. 1996) is an Iraqi journalist and news anchor. She is the first Afro-Iraqi to feature on the country's state media channels, and since September 2021 has co-hosted the news for Al Iraqiya.

== Early life ==
Al-Aziz grew up in a middle-class family in Baghdad; her father was a businessman while her mother owned a stationery shop. Al-Aziz went on to obtain a degree in Agricultural Economics and work for an import distribution business prior to her becoming a journalist.

== Journalism career ==
Al-Aziz was scouted as a news anchor while at a café in Baghdad where she was overheard reading from a pamphlet in Classical Arabic, the language used by news anchors in Iraq. After being scouted, she trained for 6 months, including lessons on voice and language, and studies into Iraqi national and local politics. Al-Aziz's hiring was part of an effort by the Iraqi Media Network's president, Nabil Jasim, to make the organisation be more reflective of Iraqi society; there are an estimated 1.5 million Afro-Iraqis in the country.

Al-Aziz's hiring caused some controversy, including among producers within the Iraqi Media Network; she was first Afro-Iraqi to be hired since Al Iraqiya's creation in 2003; while records are unavailable, it is also believed that no Afro-Iraqi held any prominent journalism roles during the regime of Saddam Hussein. Al-Aziz made her début as a news anchor for Iraqiya TV in September 2020. She has stated hoping that she can demonstrate to other Black Iraqis that "the colour of our skin will not stop us".

In 2022, Al-Jazeera published an article discussing a controversy which arose in Iraqi social media circles concerning coverage of Al-Aziz's career in American media.The discussions centered around the coverage's alleged implication that her hiring was atypical, based on her race and in defiance of racist norms in Iraqi society. Iraqi commentators quoted in the article claimed that the hiring was merit-based, and that such discrimination was in fact a characteristic of American, not Iraqi society.

Al-Aziz has named the French-Lebanese journalist Randa Habib and the Algerian journalist Khadija Benguenna as among her inspirations, in addition to Radio Monte Carlo and the BBC.
