= Tabuk =

Tabuk may refer to:

- Tabuk, Kalinga, the capital city of Kalinga province of the Philippines
- Tabuk Province, a province of Saudi Arabia
  - Tabuk, Saudi Arabia, capital city of the province
  - Tabuk Regional Airport
- Expedition of Tabuk, a military expedition initiated by the Islamic prophet Muhammad in October, AD 630
- Tabuk Sniper Rifle, an Iraqi rifle
