= Salmeen Khamis =

Emirati footballer (born 1991)

Personal information
- Full name: Salmeen Khamis Salmeen Saqer
- Date of birth: 9 October 1991 (age 35)
- Place of birth: United Arab Emirates
- Height: 1.83 m (6 ft 0 in)
- Position: Defender

Youth career
- Al Ahli

Senior career*
Years	Team	Apps	(Gls)
2010–2024	Shabab Al-Ahli	118	(6)
2012–2013	→ Sharjah (loan)		
- * Club domestic league appearances and goals

Salmeen Khamis (Arabic:سالمين خميس) (born 9 October 1991) is an Emirati footballer. He currently plays as a defender.
