= Muhammad Saad al-Beshi =

Saudi Arabian Professional Executioner

- محمد سعد البيشي
- Born: 1961 (age 64–65)
- Occupation: Executioner
- Years active: 1998–present
- Children: 7

Muhammad Saad al-Beshi (Arabic: محمد سعد البيشي; born 1961) has been an executioner for the government of Saudi Arabia since 1998. He has been described as "Saudi Arabia's leading executioner". Beshi claims to have executed ten people in one day.

Al-Beshi first worked at a prison in Taif, handcuffing and blindfolding prisoners facing death. He carried out his first execution in Jeddah in 1998.

Al-Beshi performs executions by decapitation, using a sword, and occasionally uses a firearm. Al-Beshi also performs amputations of limbs when required under Saudi Arabia's sharia law.

Al-Beshi is married and is the father of seven children. He has been known to allow his children to help clean his sword. He trained his son, Musaed, to become an executioner.
