= Etab =

Etab; عتاب

Background information
- Born: Arabic: طروف عبد الخير آدم طلال; tarūf ʻabdul-ḵair ṭallāl; 30 December 1947; Riyadh, Saudi Arabia
- Died: 19 August 2007 (aged 59) Cairo, Egypt
- Occupations: singer, actress
- Years active: 1960s–1990s

Tarouf Abdulkhair Adam Talal (Arabic: طروف عبد الخير آدم طلال, 30 December 1947 (Note: Contemporary reports of her death state that she was 66 years old at the time, implying that she was born in about 1941.) – 19 August 2007), stage name Etab (Arabic: عتاب, romanized: ʻitāb), was a Saudi Arabian singer. She was active from the 1960s to the 1990s.

== Life ==
Etab was born on the 30 December 1947 in Riyadh, the capital of Saudi Arabia. She moved to Egypt soon after her marriage to an Egyptian man in 1978. In 1983 she became an Egyptian citizen.

She started singing in the 1960s, and performed at weddings with Sarah Osman and the ʻoud player Hayat Saleh. She recorded more than fifteen albums and appeared in three films. She became ill with cancer in 1997, and died in Cairo on the 19 August 2007.

She was a member of the Egyptian Musicians Syndicate and of the Union of Arab Artists. On the 30 December 2017, which would have been her seventieth birthday, she was the subject of a Google Doodle.

== See also ==
- Arabic music
- Ibtisam Lutfi
- Khaliji music
- Music of Saudi Arabia
- Culture of Saudi Arabia
