= Mahboob Qirvanian =

Mahboob Qirvanian (born Tunisia 1894) was an enslaved person who, after being bought and sold several times, his name changing each time, was educated as a slave in the Ottoman Middle East and went on to write a Persian- and Arabic-language memoir of his life. The work is noted as a rare autobiographical account of life as a slave in the Middle East. Qirvanian was eventually liberated and became an Iranian citizen.
