= Timeline of abolition of slavery and serfdom =

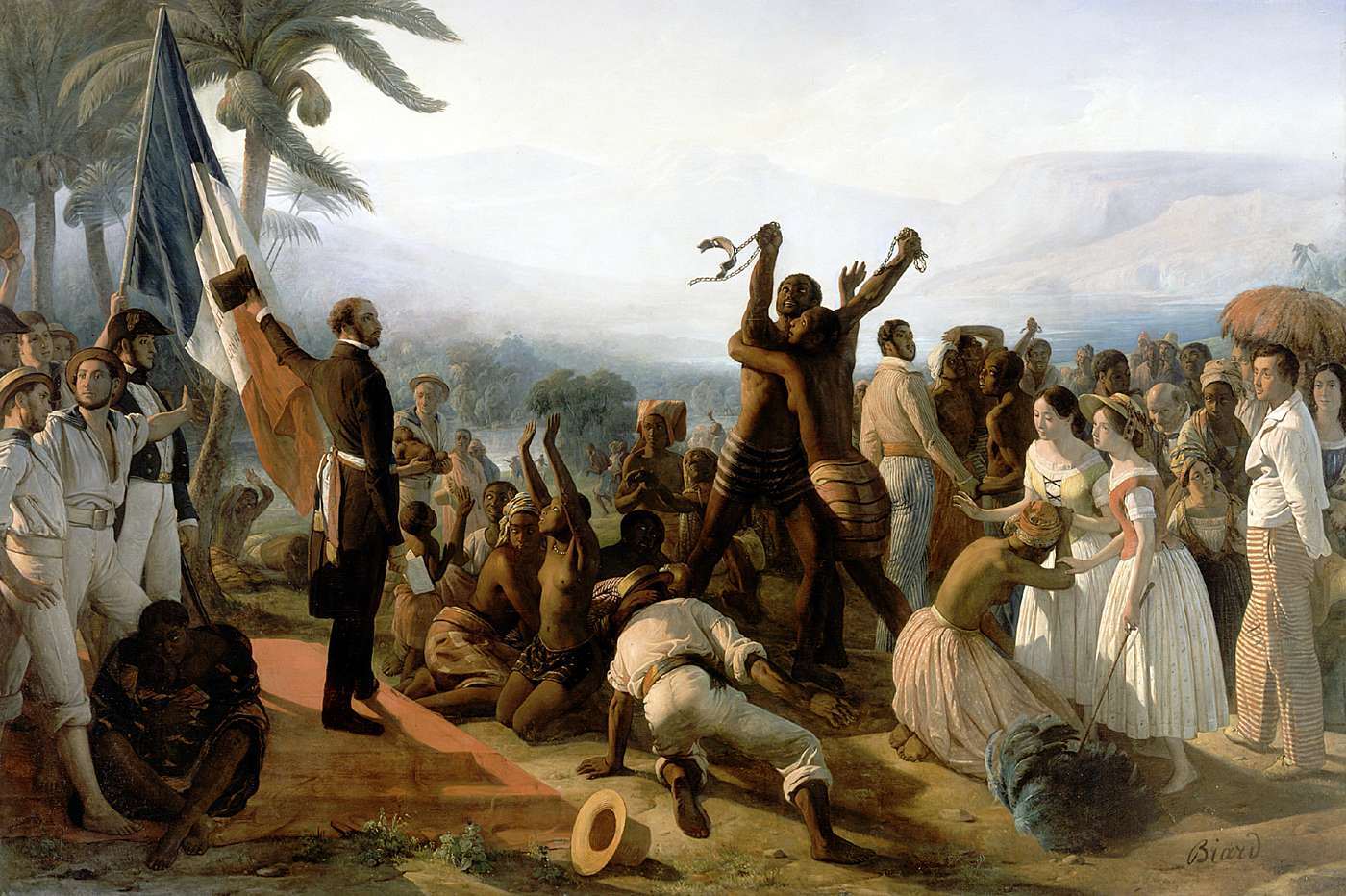
Proclamation of the Abolition of Slavery in the French Colonies, 27 April 1848, 1849, by François Auguste Biard, Palace of Versailles

The abolition of slavery occurred at different times in different countries. It frequently occurred sequentially in more than one stage – for example, as abolition of the trade in slaves in a specific country, and then as abolition of slavery throughout empires. There are also different types of slavery or servitude which were prohibited at different times. Each step was usually the result of a separate law or action. This timeline shows abolition laws or actions listed chronologically. It also covers the abolition of serfdom.

Today, no country in the world openly allows slavery of non-prisoners, but the practice continues in many locations around the world, mainly in Africa, Asia, and Eastern Europe, and often with government support.

== Ancient times ==
During classical antiquity, several prominent societies in Europe and the ancient Near East regulated enslavement for debt and the related but distinct practice of debt bondage (in which a creditor could extract compulsory labor from a debtor in repayment of their debt, but the debtor was not formally enslaved and was not subject to all the conditions of chattel slavery, such as being perpetually owned, sellable on the open market, or stripped of kinship).

Reforms listed below such as the laws of Solon in Athens, the Lex Poetelia Papiria in Republican Rome, or rules set forth in the Hebrew Bible in the Book of Deuteronomy generally regulated the supply of slaves and debt-servants by forbidding or regulating the bondage of certain privileged groups (thus, the Roman reforms protected Roman citizens, the Athenian reforms protected Athenian citizens, and the rules in Deuteronomy guaranteed freedom to a Hebrew after a fixed duration of servitude), but none abolished slavery, and even what protections were instituted did not apply to foreigners or noncitizen subjects.

Date	Jurisdiction	Description
Early sixth century BC	Polis of Athens	The Athenian lawgiver Solon abolishes debt slavery of Athenian citizens and frees all Athenian citizens who had formerly been enslaved. Athenian chattel slavery continued to be practiced, and the loss of debt-bondage as a competing source of compulsory labor may even have spurred slavery to become more important in the Athenian economy henceforth.
3rd century BC	Maurya Empire	Indian emperor Ashoka abolishes the slave trade within the Empire.
326 BC	Roman Republic	Lex Poetelia Papiria abolishes Nexum contracts, a form of pledging the debt bondage of poor Roman citizens to wealthy creditors as security for loans. Chattel slavery was not abolished, and Roman slavery would continue to flourish for centuries.
9–12 AD	Xin dynasty	Wang Mang, first and only emperor of the Xin dynasty, usurped the Chinese throne and instituted a series of sweeping reforms, including the abolition of slavery and radical land reform from 9–12 A.D. It would be reinstituted after his passing, as these, amongst other reforms were unpopular with elite sentiment.

== Medieval times ==
N.B.: Many of the listed reforms were reversed over succeeding centuries.

Date	Jurisdiction	Description
590–604	Rome	Pope Gregory I bans Jews from owning Christian slaves.
7th century	Francia	Queen Balthild, a former slave, and the Council of Chalon-sur-Saône (644–655) condemn the enslavement of Christians. Balthild purchases slaves, mostly Saxon, and manumits (frees) them.
741–752	Rome	Pope Zachary bans the sale of Christian slaves to Muslims, purchases all slaves acquired in the city by Venetian slave traders, and sets them free.
840	Carolingian Empire; Venice	Pactum Lotharii: Venice pledges to neither buy Christian slaves in the Empire, nor sell them to Muslims. Venetian slave traders switch to trading Slavs from the East (Balkan slave trade).
873	Christendom	Pope John VIII declares the enslavement of fellow Christians a sin and commands their release.
~900	Byzantine Empire	Emperor Leo VI the Wise prohibits voluntary self-enslavement and commands that such contracts shall be null and void and punishable by flagellation for both parties to the contract.
922	Holy Roman Empire	Council of Koblenz prohibited slave trading.
956	Goryeo Dynasty (Korea)	Slaves were freed on a large scale in 956 by the Goryeo dynasty. Gwangjong of Goryeo proclaimed the Slave and Land Act (노비안검법, 奴婢按檢法), an act that "deprived nobles of much of their manpower in the form of slaves and purged the old nobility, the meritorious subjects and their offspring and military lineages in great numbers".
960	Venice	Slave trade banned in the city under the rule of Doge Pietro IV Candiano (Council of Venice).
1080	Norman England	William the Conqueror prohibits the sale of any person to "heathens" (non-Christians) as slaves.
1100	Normandy	Serfdom no longer present.
1102	Norman England	The Council of London bans the slave trade: "Let no one dare hereafter to engage in the infamous business, prevalent in England, of selling men like animals."
c. 1160	Norway	The Gulating bans the sale of house slaves out of the country.
1171	Ireland	All English slaves in the island freed by the Council of Armagh.
1198	France	Trinitarian Order founded with the purpose of redeeming war captives.
1214	Korčula	The Statute of the Town abolishes slavery.
1218	(Catalonia) Aragon	Mercedarians founded in Barcelona with the purpose of ransoming poor Christians enslaved by Muslims.
~1220	Holy Roman Empire	The Sachsenspiegel, the most influential German code of law from the Middle Ages, condemns slavery as a violation of man's likeness to God.
1245	(Catalonia) Aragon	James I bans Jews from owning Christian slaves, but allows them to own Muslims and pagans.
1256	Bologna	Liber Paradisus promulgated. Slavery and serfdom abolished, all serfs in the commune are released.
1318	France	King Philip V abolishes serfdom in his domain.
1335	Sweden	Slavery abolished (including Sweden's territory in Finland). However, slaves are not banned entry into the country until 1813. Between 1784 and 1847, slavery was practiced in the Swedish-ruled Caribbean island of Saint Barthélemy. Sweden never practiced serfdom, except in a few territories it later acquired which were ruled under a local legal code.
1347	Poland	The Statutes of Casimir the Great issued in Wiślica emancipate all non-free people.
1368	Ming Dynasty	Emperor Hongwu abolished most forms of slavery, limiting even the highest ranks of household to less than 20 household slaves. Later in the dynasty saw a resurgence of debt servitude, primarily in the south, as a result of population growth against the dearth of arable lands, often taking euphemisms like "adoption" to circumvent its still outlawed status.
1416	Ragusa	Slavery and slave trade abolished.
1423	Poland	King orders to free all Christian slaves.
1435	Canary Islands	Pope Eugene IV's Sicut Dudum bans enslavement of baptised Christians, "or those freely seeking baptism" in the Canary Islands on pain of excommunication.
1477	(Crown of Castile) Castile	Isabella I bans slavery in newly conquered territories.
1480	Galicia	Remnant serfdom abolished by the Catholic Monarchs.
1486	(Crown of Aragon) Catalonia	Ferdinand II promulgates the Sentence of Guadalupe, abolishing Carolingian-remnant serfdom (remença) in Old Catalonia.
1490	(Crown of Castile) Castile	After a long court case, the Catholic Monarchs order that all La Gomera natives enslaved in the aftermath of the 1488 rebellion must be freed and returned to the island at Conquistador Pedro de Vera's expense. De Vera is also relieved from his post as Governor of Gran Canaria in 1491.
1493	(Crown of Castile) Castile	Queen Isabella bans the enslavement of Native Americans unless they are hostile or cannibalistic. Native Americans are ruled to be subjects of the Crown. Columbus is preempted from selling Indian captives in Seville and those already sold are tracked, purchased from their buyers and released.

== 1500–1700 ==
Date	Jurisdiction	Description
1503	(Crown of Castile) Castile	The Indigenous peoples of the Americas allowed to travel to Spain only on their own free will.
1512	(Crown of Castile) Castile	The Laws of Burgos establish limits to the treatment of natives of the Americas in the Encomienda system.
1518	(Spanish Empire) Spain	Decree of Holy Roman Emperor Charles V establishing the importation of African slaves to the Americas, under monopoly of Laurent de Gouvenot, in an attempt to discourage enslavement of the indigenous peoples of the Americas.
1528	(Spanish Empire) Spain	Charles V forbids the transportation of the indigenous peoples of the Americas to Europe, even on their own will, in an effort to curtail their enslavement. Encomiendas are banned from collecting tribute in gold with the reasoning that Natives were selling their children to get it.
1530	(Spanish Empire) Spain	The New Laws ban outright the enslavement of the Indigenous peoples of the Americas under any circumstance.
1536	(Spanish Empire) Spain	The Welser family is dispossessed of the Asiento monopoly (granted in 1528) following complaints about their treatment of Native American workers in Venezuela.
1537	New World	Pope Paul III forbids slavery of the indigenous peoples of the Americas and any other population to be discovered, establishing their right to freedom and property (Sublimis Deus).
1542	(Spanish Empire) Spain	The New Laws ban slave raiding in the Americas and abolish the slavery of natives, but replace it with other systems of forced labor like the repartimiento. Slavery of Black Africans continues. New limits are imposed to the Encomienda.
1549	(Spanish Empire) Spain	Encomiendas banned from using forced labor.
1550-1551	(Spanish Empire) Spain	Valladolid Debate on the innate rights of indigenous peoples of the Americas.
1552	(Spanish Empire) Spain	Bartolomé de las Casas, "the first to expose the oppression of indigenous peoples by Europeans in the Americas and to call for the abolition of slavery there."
1562	Mughal Empire	Akbar I restricted enslavement by his soldiery.
1570	Portugal	King Sebastian of Portugal bans the enslavement of Native Americans under Portuguese rule, allowing only the enslavement of hostile ones. This law was highly influenced by the Society of Jesus, which had missionaries in direct contact with Brazilian tribes.
1574	England	Last remaining serfs emancipated by Elizabeth I.
1588	Lithuania	The Third Statute of Lithuania abolishes slavery.
1590	Japan	Toyotomi Hideyoshi bans slavery except as punishment for criminals.
1595	Portugal	Trade of Chinese slaves banned.
1602	England	The Clifton Star Chamber Case set a precedent, that impressing / enslaving children to serve as actors was illegal.
1609	(Spanish Empire) Spain	The Moriscos, many of whom are serfs, are expelled from Peninsular Spain unless they become slaves voluntarily (known as moros cortados, "cut Moors") However, a large proportion avoid expulsion or manage to return.
1624	Portugal	Enslavement of Chinese banned.
1648	Cossack Hetmanate	The system of serfdom was partially weakened, a part of serfs were freed. Manors of the Polish szlachta and the Catholic Church were given under the government control.
1649	Russia	The sale of Russian slaves to Muslims is banned.
1652	Providence Plantations	Roger Williams and Samuel Gorton work to pass legislation abolishing slavery in Providence Plantations, the first attempt of its kind in North America. It does not go into effect.
1660	England	Tenures Abolition Act 1660
1677	Maratha Empire	Shivaji I banned, freed and stopped import and export of all slaves under his Empire.
1679	Russia	Feodor III converts all Russian field slaves into serfs.
1683	(Spanish Empire) Spanish Chile	Slavery of Mapuche prisoners of war abolished.
1687	(Spanish Empire) Spanish Florida	Fugitive slaves from the Thirteen Colonies granted freedom in return for conversion to Catholicism and four years of military service.
1688	Pennsylvania	The Germantown Quaker Petition Against Slavery is the first religious petition against African slavery in what would become the United States.

== 1701–1799 ==
Date	Jurisdiction	Description
1706	England	In Smith v. Browne & Cooper, Sir John Holt, Lord Chief Justice of England, rules that "as soon as a Negro comes into England, he becomes free. One may be a villein in England, but not a slave."
1711–1712	Imereti	Slave trade banned by Mamia I of Imereti.
1712	Spain	Moros cortados expelled.
1715	North Carolina; South Carolina	Native American slave trade in the American Southeast reduces with the outbreak of the Yamasee War.
1723	Russia	Peter the Great converts all house slaves into house serfs, effectively making slavery illegal in Russia.
1723–1730	Qing Dynasty	The Yongzheng emancipation seeks to free all slaves to strengthen the autocratic ruler through a kind of social leveling that creates an undifferentiated class of free subjects under the throne. Although these new regulations freed the vast majority of slaves, wealthy families continued to use slave labor into the twentieth century.
1732	Georgia	Province established without African slavery in sharp contrast to neighboring colony of Carolina. In 1738, James Oglethorpe warns against changing that policy, which would "occasion the misery of thousands in Africa." Native American slavery is legal throughout Georgia, however, and African slavery is later introduced in 1749.
1738	(Spain) Spanish Florida	Fort Mosé, the first legal settlement of free blacks in what is today the United States, is established. Word of the settlement sparks the Stono Rebellion in Carolina the following year.
1746	Great Britain	Heritable Jurisdictions (Scotland) Act 1746
1746	Great Britain	Tenures Abolition Act 1746
1761	Portugal	The Marquis of Pombal bans the importation of slaves and automatically frees any slaves brought to mainland Portugal. The trade of African slaves to Brazil continued until the 19th century, after independence in 1822.
1766	Spain	Muhammad III of Morocco purchases the freedom of all Muslim slaves in Seville, Cádiz, and Barcelona.
1769	England	Granville Sharp publishes A Representation of the Injustice and Dangerous Tendency of Tolerating Slavery, the first tract in England attacking slavery.
1770	Circassia	The Circassians of the Abdzakh region started a great revolution in Circassian territory in 1770. Classes such as slaves, nobles and princes were completely abolished.
1771	Kingdom of Sardinia	Serfdom abolished in the lands ruled by the House of Savoy.
1772	England	Somersett's case rules that no slave can be forcibly removed from England. This case was generally taken at the time to have decided that the condition of slavery did not exist under English law in England and Wales.
1773	Portugal	A new decree by the Marquis of Pombal, signed by the king Dom José, emancipates fourth-generation slaves and every child born to an enslaved mother after the decree was published. It also stated that former slaves should no longer be called "Liberated", and allowed access to "any trade, honour, and dignity".
1774	East India Company	Government of Bengal passed regulations 9 and 10 of 1774, prohibiting the trade in slaves without written deed, and the sale of anyone not already enslaved.
1775	Great Britain	Colliers and Salters (Scotland) Act 1775
1775	(United States) Pennsylvania	Pennsylvania Abolition Society formed in Philadelphia, the first abolition society within the territory that is now the United States of America.
1775	United States	Atlantic slave trade banned or suspended in the United Colonies during the Revolutionary War. This was a continuation of the Thirteen Colonies' non-importation agreements against Britain, as an attempt to cut all economic ties with Britain during the war.
1777	(Portugal) Madeira	Slavery abolished.
1777	Vermont	The Constitution of the Vermont Republic partially bans slavery, freeing men over 21 and women older than 18 at the time of its passage. The ban is not strongly enforced.
1778	Scotland	Joseph Knight successfully argues that Scots law cannot support the status of slavery.
1779	British America	The Philipsburg Proclamation frees all slaves who desert the American rebels, regardless of their willingness to fight for the Crown.
1780	(United States) Pennsylvania	An Act for the Gradual Abolition of Slavery passed, freeing future children of slaves. Those born prior to the Act remain enslaved for life. The Act becomes a model for other Northern states. Last slaves freed 1847.
1781	Archduchy of Austria	Joseph II abolishes personal bondage of serfs and allows their freedom of movement with the Serfdom Patent of 1781.
1783	Russian Empire	Slavery abolished in the recently annexed Crimean Khanate.
1783	Massachusetts	Massachusetts Supreme Judicial Court rules slavery unconstitutional, a decision based on the 1780 Massachusetts constitution. All slaves are immediately freed.
1783	Austrian Empire	Joseph II abolishes slavery in Bukovina.
1783	New Hampshire	Gradual abolition of slavery begins.
1783	British America	After being settled into by Quakers, Beaver Harbour, New Brunswick becomes the first settlement in British North America to ban slavery, forbidding slave masters from entering.
1784	Connecticut	Gradual abolition of slavery, freeing future children of slaves, and later all slaves.
1784	Rhode Island	Gradual abolition of slavery begins.
1785	Kingdom of Hungary	In response to the Revolt of Horea, Joseph II abolishes personal bondage and allows freedom of movement for peasants in Hungary with the urbarium of 22 August 1785.
1786	New South Wales	A policy of completely banning slavery is adopted by governor-designate Arthur Phillip for the soon-to-be established colony.
1787	United States	The United States in Congress Assembled passes the Northwest Ordinance of 1787, outlawing any new slavery in the Northwest Territories.
1787	Sierra Leone	Founded by Great Britain as a colony for emancipated slaves.
1787	Great Britain	Society for the Abolition of the Slave Trade founded in Great Britain.
1788	Great Britain	Sir William Dolben's Act regulating the conditions on British slave ships enacted.
1788	France	Abolitionist Society of the Friends of the Blacks founded in Paris.
1788	Denmark	Limits imposed to serfdom under the Stavnsbånd system.
1789	France	Last remaining seigneurial privileges over peasants abolished.
1791	Poland-Lithuania	The Constitution of May 3, 1791 introduced elements of political equality between townspeople and nobility, and placed the peasants under the protection of the government; thus, it mitigated the worst abuses of serfdom.
1791	France	Emancipation of second-generation slaves in the colonies.
1792	Denmark-Norway	Transatlantic slave trade declared illegal after 1803, though slavery continues in Danish colonies to 1848.
1792	(United Kingdom) Saint Helena	The importation of slaves to the island of Saint Helena was banned in 1792, but the phased emancipation of over 800 resident slaves did not take place until 1827, which was still some six years before the British parliament passed legislation to ban slavery in the colonies.
1793	Saint-Domingue	Commissioner Leger-Felicite Sonthonax abolishes slavery in the northern part of the colony. His colleague Etienne Polverel does the same in the rest of the territory in October.
1793	Upper Canada	Importation of slaves banned by the Act Against Slavery.
1794	France	Slavery abolished in all French territories and possessions.
1794	United States	The Slave Trade Act bans both American ships from participating in the slave trade and the export of slaves in foreign ships.
1794	Poland-Lithuania	The Proclamation of Połaniec, issued during the Kościuszko Uprising, ultimately abolished serfdom in Poland, and granted substantial civil liberties to all peasants.
1798	(French First Republic) French Malta	Slavery banned in the islands after their capture by French forces under the command of Napoleon Bonaparte.
1799	New York	Gradual emancipation act freeing the future children of slaves, and all slaves in 1827.
1799	Scotland	The Colliers (Scotland) Act 1799 ends the legal servitude or slavery of coal and salt miners that had been established in 1606.

== 1800–1829 ==
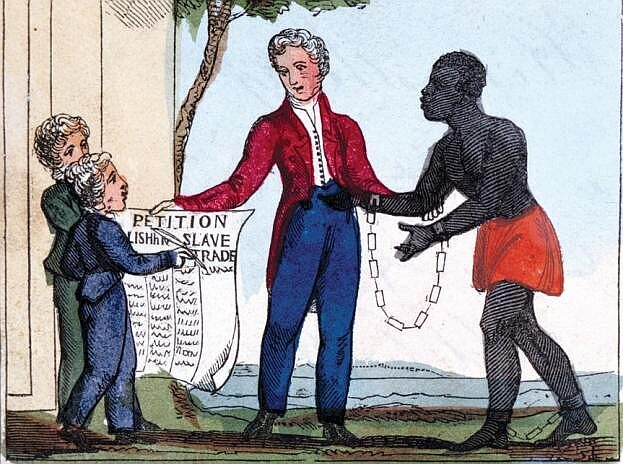
Illustration from the book: The Black Man's Lament, Or, How to Make Sugar by Amelia Opie (London, 1826)

Date	Jurisdiction	Description
1800	Joseon	State slavery banned in 1800. Private slavery continued until being banned in 1894.
1800	Malta	Despite being in rebellion against the French, the National Congress confirms the validity of Napoleon's 1798 abolition of slavery, and Alexander Ball issues a proclamation to this effect.
1800	United States	American citizens banned from investment and employment in the international slave trade in an additional Slave Trade Act.
1802	France	Napoleon re-introduces slavery in sugarcane-growing colonies.
1802	(United States) Ohio	State constitution abolishes slavery.
1803	Denmark-Norway	Abolition of Danish participation in the transatlantic slave trade takes effect on 1 January.
1804	New Jersey	Slavery abolished.
1804	Haiti	Haiti declares independence and abolishes slavery.
1805	United Kingdom	A bill for abolition passes in House of Commons but is rejected in the House of Lords.
1806	United States	In a message to Congress, Thomas Jefferson calls for criminalizing the international slave trade, asking Congress to "withdraw the citizens of the United States from all further participation in those violations of human rights ... which the morality, the reputation, and the best of our country have long been eager to proscribe."
1807	United States	International slave trade made a felony in Act Prohibiting Importation of Slaves; this act takes effect on 1 January 1808, the earliest date permitted under the Constitution.
1807	United Kingdom	Abolition of the Slave Trade Act abolishes slave trading throughout the British Empire. Captains fined £100 per slave transported. Patrols sent to the African coast to arrest slaving vessels. The West Africa Squadron (Royal Navy) is established to suppress slave trading; by 1865, nearly 150,000 people freed by anti-slavery operations.
1807	(Poland) Warsaw	Constitution abolishes serfdom.
1807	Prussia	The Stein-Hardenberg Reforms abolish serfdom.
1807	(United States) Michigan Territory	Judge Augustus Woodward denies the return of two slaves owned by a man in Windsor, Upper Canada. Woodward declares that any man "coming into this Territory is by law of the land a freeman."
1808	United States	Importation and exportation of slaves made a crime.
1810	New Spain	Independence leader Miguel Hidalgo y Costilla proclaimed the abolition of slavery three months after the start of the Independence of Mexico from Spain.
1811	United Kingdom	Slave trading made a felony punishable by transportation for both British subjects and foreigners.
1811	Spain	The Cortes of Cádiz abolish the last remaining seigneurial rights.
1811	British East India Company	The Company issued regulations 10 of 1811, prohibiting the transport of slaves into Company territory, adding to the 1774 restrictions.
1811	Chile	The First National Congress approves a proposal of Manuel de Salas that declares Freedom of Wombs, freeing the children of slaves born in Chilean territory, regardless of their parents' condition. The slave trade is banned and the slaves who stay for more than six months in Chilean territory are automatically declared freedmen.
1812	(United Kingdom) Malta Protectorate	British protectorate authorities issue a proclamation declaring that "negroes cannot be considered as objects of trade" in response to reports of African slaves being imported into Malta from North Africa, despite slavery having previously been abolished on Malta in 1798.
1812	Spain	The Cortes of Cádiz pass the Spanish Constitution of 1812, giving citizenship and equal rights to all residents in Spain and her territories, excluding slaves. During deliberations, Deputies José Miguel Guridi y Alcocer and Agustín Argüelles unsuccessfully argue for the abolition of slavery.
1813	New Spain	Independence leader José María Morelos y Pavón declares slavery abolished in Mexico in the documents Sentimientos de la Nación.
1813	United Provinces	Law of Wombs passed by the Assembly of Year XIII. Slaves born after 31 January 1813 will be granted freedom when they are married, or on their 16th birthday for women and 20th for men, and upon their manumission will be given land and tools to work it.
1814	United Provinces	After the occupation of Montevideo, all slaves born in modern Uruguayan territory are declared free.
1814	Netherlands	Slave trade abolished.
1815	France	Napoleon abolishes the slave trade.
1815	Portugal	Slave trade banned north of the Equator in return for a £750,000 payment by Britain.
1815	(Spain) Florida	British withdrawing after the War of 1812 leave a fully armed fort in the hands of maroons, escaped slaves and their descendants, and their Seminole allies. Becomes known as Negro Fort.
1815	United Kingdom; Portugal; Sweden-Norway; France; Austria; Russia; Spain; Prussia	The Congress of Vienna declares its opposition to the slave trade.
1816	Estonia	Serfdom abolished.
1816	(Spain) Florida	Negro Fort destroyed in the Battle of Negro Fort by U.S. forces under the command of General Andrew Jackson.
1816	Algeria	Algiers bombarded by the British and Dutch navies in an attempt to end North African piracy and slave raiding in the Mediterranean. 3,000 slaves freed.
1817	Courland	Serfdom abolished.
1817	United Kingdom; Spain	Bilateral treaty abolishing the slave trade.
1817	Spain	Ferdinand VII signs a cedula banning the importation of slaves in Spanish possessions beginning in 1820, in return for a £400,000 payment from Britain. However, some slaves are still smuggled in after this date. Both slave ownership and internal commerce in slaves remained legal.
1817	Venezuela	Simon Bolivar calls for the abolition of slavery.
1817	New York	4 July 1827 set as date to free all ex-slaves from indenture.
1817	United Provinces	Constitution supports the abolition of slavery, but does not ban it.
1818	United Kingdom; Portugal	Bilateral treaty abolishing the slave trade.
1818	France	Slave trade banned.
1818	United Kingdom; Netherlands	Bilateral treaty taking additional measures to enforce the 1814 ban on slave trading.
1819	Livonia	Serfdom abolished.
1819	(United Kingdom) Upper Canada	Attorney-General John Robinson declares all black residents free.
1819	Hawaii	The ancient Hawaiian kapu system is abolished during the ʻAi Noa, and with it the distinction between the kauwā slave class and the makaʻāinana (commoners).
1820	United States	The Compromise of 1820 bans slavery north of the 36º 30' line; the Act to Protect the Commerce of the United States and Punish the Crime of Piracy is amended to consider the maritime slave trade as piracy, making it punishable with death.
1820	Indiana	The supreme court orders almost all slaves in the state to be freed in Polly v. Lasselle.
1820	Spain	The 1817 abolition of the slave trade takes effect.
1821	Mexico	The Plan of Iguala frees the slaves born in Mexico.
1821	United States; Spain	In accordance with Adams–Onís Treaty of 1819, Florida becomes a territory of the United States. A main reason was Spain's inability or unwillingness to capture and return escaped slaves.
1821	Peru	Abolition of slave trade and implementation of a plan to gradually end slavery.
1821	Gran Colombia	Emancipation for sons and daughters born to slave mothers, program for compensated emancipation set.
1822	Haiti	Jean Pierre Boyer annexes Spanish Haiti and abolishes slavery there.
1822	Liberia	Founded by the American Colonization Society as a colony for emancipated slaves.
1822	Muscat and Oman; United Kingdom	First bilateral treaty limiting the slave trade in Zanzibar (Moresby Treaty).
1823	Chile	Slavery abolished.
1823	United Kingdom	The Society for the Mitigation and Gradual Abolition of Slavery Throughout the British Dominions (Anti-Slavery Society) is founded.
1823	Greece	Prohibition of slavery is enshrined in the Greek Constitution of 1823, during the Greek War of Independence.
1824	United Kingdom	Slave Trade Act 1824
1824	Mexico	The new constitution effectively abolishes slavery.
1824	Central America	Slavery abolished.
1825	Uruguay	Importation of slaves banned.
1825	Haiti	France, with warships at the ready, demanded Haiti compensate France for its loss of slaves and its slave colony
1827	United Kingdom; Sweden-Norway	Bilateral treaty abolishing the slave trade.
1827	New York	Last vestiges of slavery abolished. Children born between 1799 and 1827 are indentured until age 25 (females) or age 28 (males).
1827	(United Kingdom) Saint Helena	Phased emancipation of over 800 resident slaves, some six years before the British parliament passed legislation to ban slavery in all colonies.
1829	Mexico	Last slaves freed just as the first president of partial African ancestry (Vicente Guerrero) is elected.

== 1830–1849 ==
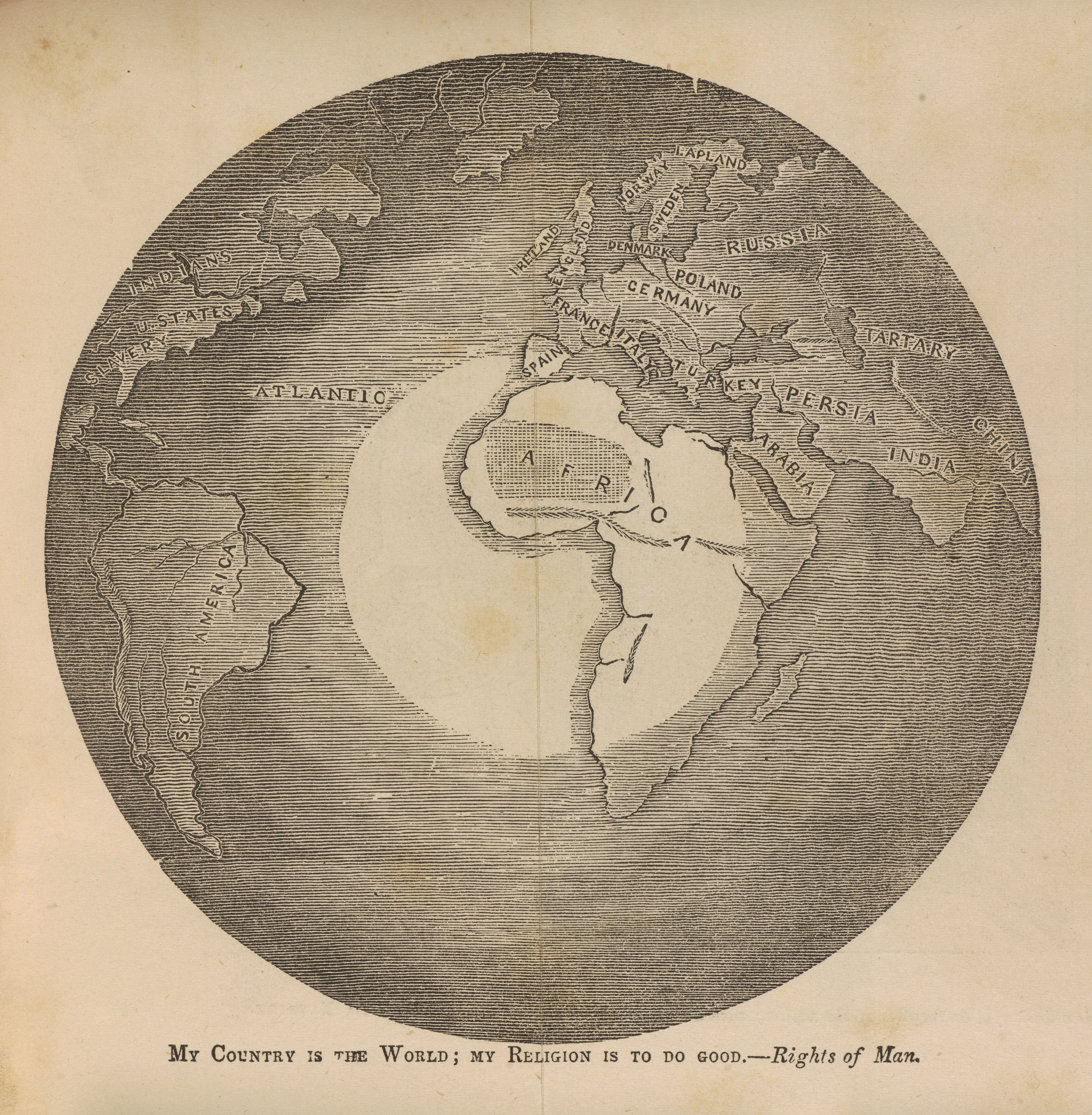
An anti-slavery map with an unusual perspective centered on West Africa, which is in the light, and contrasting the Americas and Europe in the dark. By Julius Rubens Ames, 1847.

Date	Jurisdiction	Description
1830	Coahuila y Tejas	Mexican President Anastasio Bustamante attempts to implement the abolition of slavery. To circumvent the law, Anglo-Texans declare their slaves "indentured servants for life".
1830	Ottoman Empire	The Firman of 1830 theoretically emancipates all white slaves in the Ottoman Empire.
1830	Uruguay	Slavery abolished.
1831	Bolivia	Slavery abolished.
1831	(Empire of Brazil) Brazil	Law of 7 November 1831, abolishing the maritime slave trade, banning any importation of slaves, and granting freedom to slaves illegally imported into Brazil. The law was seldom enforced prior to 1850, when Brazil, under British pressure, adopted additional legislation to criminalize the importation of slaves.
1832	Greece	Slavery abolished with independence.
1832	Coahuila y Tejas	Anahuac Disturbances: Juan Davis Bradburn, American-born Mexican officer at Anahuac, Texas, confronts slave-owning American settlers, enforcing Mexican abolition of slavery and refusing to hand over two escaped slaves.
1834	United Kingdom	The Slavery Abolition Act 1833 comes into force, abolishing slavery throughout most of the British Empire but on a gradual basis over the next six years. Legally frees 700,000 in the West Indies, 20,000 in Mauritius, and 40,000 in South Africa. The exceptions are the territories controlled by the East India Company and Ceylon.
1834	France	French Society for the Abolition of Slavery founded in Paris.
1835	Serbia	The Sretenje Constitution granted freedom to all slaves the moment they stepped on Serbian soil. The constitution was repealed fourteen days after coming into force.
1835	United Kingdom; France	Bilateral treaties abolishing the slave trade.
1835	United Kingdom; Denmark	Bilateral treaties abolishing the slave trade.
1835	Peru	A decree of Felipe Santiago Salaverry re-legalizes the importation of slaves from other Latin American countries. The line "no slave shall enter Peru without becoming free" is taken out of the Constitution in 1839.
1836	Portugal	Prime Minister Sá da Bandeira bans the transatlantic slave trade and the importation and exportation of slaves to or from the Portuguese colonies south of the equator.
1837	Spain	Slavery abolished outside of the colonies.
1838	United Kingdom	Most slaves in the colonies become free after a period of forced apprenticeship following the Slavery Abolition Act 1833. Society for the Mitigation and Gradual Abolition of Slavery Throughout the British Dominions (now London Anti-Slavery Society) winds up.
1839	United Kingdom	The British and Foreign Anti-Slavery Society (after several changes, now known as Anti-Slavery International) is founded.
1839	East India Company	The Indian indenture system is abolished in territories controlled by the company, but this is reversed in 1842.
1839	(Papal States) Catholic Church	Pope Gregory XVI's In supremo apostolatus resoundingly condemns slavery and the slave trade.
1840	United Kingdom; Venezuela	Bilateral treaty abolishing the slave trade.
1840	United Kingdom	First World Anti-Slavery Convention meets in London.
1840	New Zealand	Taking slaves banned by Treaty of Waitangi.
1841	United Kingdom; France; Russia; Prussia (Austrian Empire) Austria	Quintuple Treaty agreeing to suppress the slave trade.
1841	United States	United States v. The Amistad finds that the slaves of La Amistad were illegally enslaved and were legally allowed, as free men, to fight their captors by any means necessary.
1842	United Kingdom; Portugal	Bilateral treaty extending the enforcement of the slave trade ban to Portuguese ships south of the Equator.
1842	Paraguay	Law for the gradual abolition of slavery passed.
1843	United Kingdom	Slave Trade Act 1843
1843	East India Company	The Indian Slavery Act, 1843, Act V abolishes slavery in territories controlled by the company.
1843	United Kingdom; Uruguay	Bilateral treaties abolishing the slave trade.
1843	United Kingdom; Mexico	Bilateral treaties abolishing the slave trade.
1843	United Kingdom; Chile	Bilateral treaties abolishing the slave trade.
1843	United Kingdom; Bolivia	Bilateral treaties abolishing the slave trade.
1844	Moldavia	Mihail Sturdza abolishes slavery in Moldavia.
1844	Kingdom of Hungary	The serfs were given the Right to Property. But until the April Laws, they were subject to different taxes and legal procedures (jus gladii) than burghers.
1844	Paraguay	Slave trade abolished.
1844	Dominican Republic	Dominican Republic declares independence from Haiti; abolition of slavery reinforced.
1845	United Kingdom	36 Royal Navy ships assigned to the Anti-Slavery Squadron, making it one of the largest fleets in the world.
1845	Illinois	In Jarrot v. Jarrot, the Illinois Supreme Court frees the last indentured ex-slaves in the state who were born after the Northwest Ordinance.
1846	Tunisia	Slavery abolished in Tunisia under Ahmed Bey rule.
1847	Ottoman Empire	Suppression of the slave trade in the Persian Gulf: slave trade from Africa (via the Persian Gulf route) abolished.
1847	Saint Barthélemy	Last slaves freed.
1847	Pennsylvania	The last indentured ex-slaves, born before 1780 (fewer than 100 in the 1840 census) are freed.
1847	(Denmark) Danish West Indies	Royal edict ruling the freedom of children born from female slaves and the total abolition of slavery after 12 years. Dissatisfaction causes a slave rebellion in Saint Croix the next year.
1848	Hungary	The April laws completely abolished serfdom in Hungary (excluding Transylvania) and Croatia.
1848	(Austrian Empire) Austria	Serfdom abolished.
1848	France	Slavery abolished in the colonies. Gabon is founded as a settlement for emancipated slaves.
1848	(Denmark) Danish West Indies	Governor Peter von Scholten declares the immediate and total emancipation of all slaves in an attempt to end the slave revolt. For this he is recalled and tried for treason, but the charges are later dropped.
1848	Denmark	Last remains of the Stavnsbånd (serfdom) effectively abolished.
1848	United Kingdom; Muscat and Oman	Bilateral treaties abolishing the slave trade.
1849	United Kingdom; Trucial States	Bilateral treaties abolishing the slave trade.
1849	(United Kingdom) Sierra Leone	The Royal Navy destroys the slave factory of Lomboko.

== 1850–1899 ==
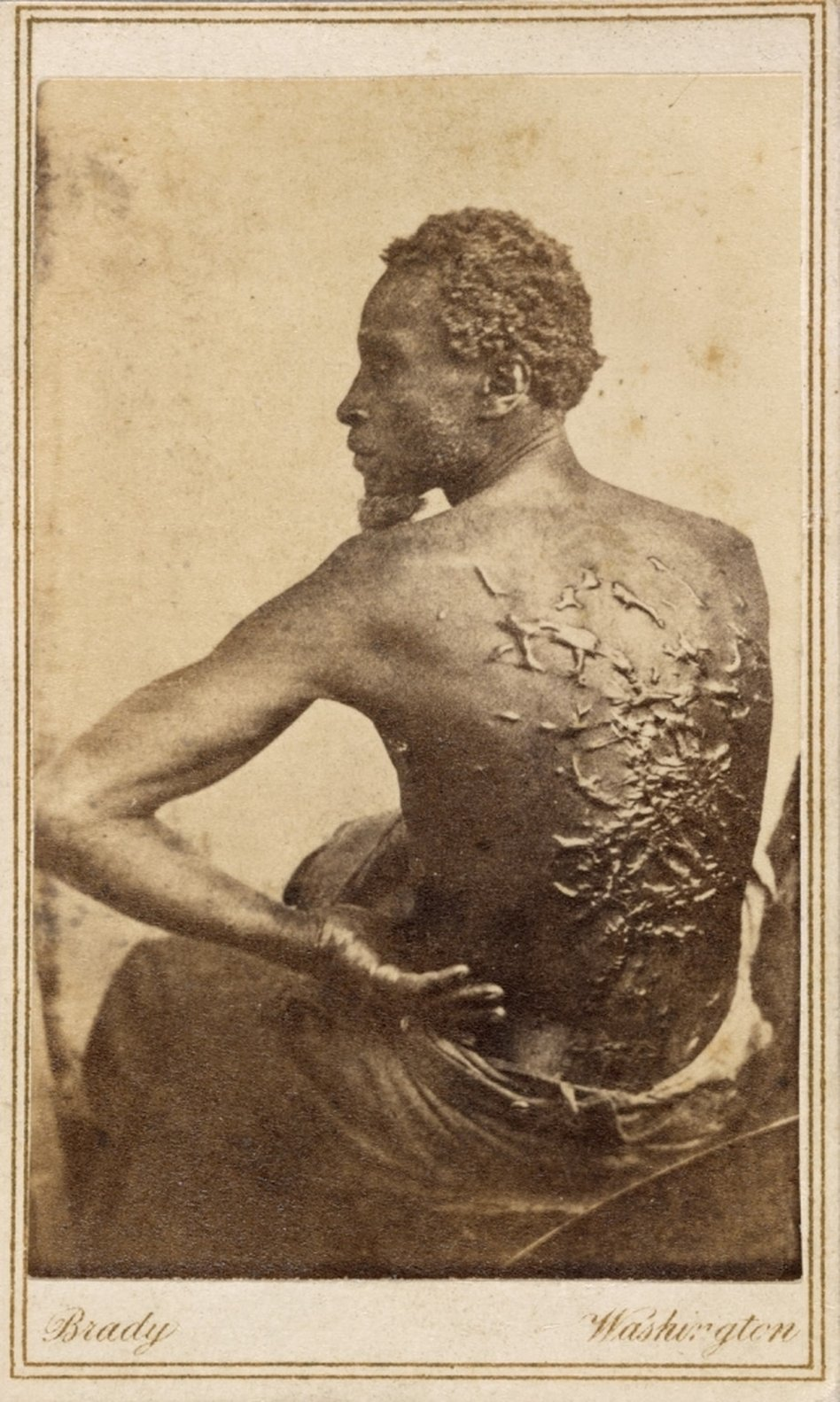
Medical examination photo of Gordon showing his scourged back, widely distributed by Abolitionists to expose the brutality of slavery

Date	Jurisdiction	Description
1850	United States	The Fugitive Slave Law of 1850 requires the return of escaped slaves to their owners regardless of the state they are in.
1850	(Empire of Brazil) Brazil	Eusébio de Queirós Law (Law 581 of 4 September 1850) criminalizing the maritime slave trade as piracy, and imposing other criminal sanctions on the importation of slaves (already banned in 1831).
1851	(Empire of Brazil) Brazil Uruguay	Bilateral treaty of 12 October, Uruguay accepts returning to Brazil the escaped slaves from that country. Brazilians who owned land in Uruguay were allowed to have slaves in their properties.
1851	Taiping Heavenly Kingdom	Slavery nominally abolished along with opium, gambling, polygamy and foot binding.
1851	New Granada	Slavery abolished. After years of laws that only purported a partial advancement towards abolition, President José Hilario López pushed Congress to pass total abolition on 21 May. Former owners were compensated with government issued bonds.
1851	Ecuador	Slavery abolished in the country by José María Urvina.
1851	Lagos	Reduction of Lagos: The British capture the city of Lagos and replace King Kosoko with Akitoye because of the former's refusal to ban the slave trade.
1852	Hawaii	1852 Constitution officially declared slavery illegal.
1852	United Kingdom; Lagos	Bilateral treaty banning the slave trade and human sacrifice.
1853	(Argentine Confederation) Argentina	Slavery abolished with the sanction of a new federal Constitution.
1854	Peru	Slavery abolished by Ramón Castilla.
1854	Ottoman Empire	The Firman of 1854 prohibits the Circassian slave trade.
1854	Venezuela	Slavery abolished.
1855	Moldavia	Slavery abolished.
1856	Wallachia	Slavery abolished.
1856-1857	Nicaragua	William Walker briefly re-legalizes slavery, but he is defeated and expelled from the country by a Costa Rican intervention.
1857	United States	Dred Scott v. Sandford rules that black slaves and their descendants cannot gain American citizenship and are not entitled to freedom even if they live in a free state for years.
1857	Egypt	Firman of 1857 bans the trade of Black African (Zanj) slaves.
1857	Ottoman Empire	The Firman of 1857 prohibits the African slave trade.
1858	United Kingdom	British government takes direct control of all land owned by the East India Company, making previously East India Company directly managed territory subject to the slavery laws applicable in the rest of the British Empire.
1859	Atlantic Ocean	Definitive suppression of the transatlantic slave trade.
1859	United States	The Wyandotte Constitution establishes the future state of Kansas as a free state, after four years of armed conflict between pro-slavery and anti-slavery groups in the territory. Southern dominance in the U.S. Senate delays the admission of Kansas as a state until 1861.
1859	United States	John Brown leads a raid with the intention of inciting a slave revolt in Harpers Ferry, Virginia, but is arrested and executed.
1859	United States	Last known slave ship to unload illegally on U.S. territory, the Clotilda.
1859	Russia	Kazakhs banned from having slaves, although slavery persists in some areas through the rest of the century.
1860	United States	Abolitionist Abraham Lincoln is elected president of the United States as the first Republican president.
1860	Honduras	William Walker is arrested and executed in his new attempt to take over Central America and reintroduce slavery.
1861	Russia	The Emancipation reform of 1861 abolishes serfdom.
1861	United States	The 1860 election of Abraham Lincoln leads to the attempted secession of eleven slaveholding states causing the American Civil War.
1861	United Kingdom; British India	Indian Penal Code explicitly prohibits slavery in British administered territory.
1862	United States	Congress passes the District of Columbia Compensated Emancipation Act, freeing all slaves in the District of Columbia.
1862	United States; United Kingdom	Bilateral treaty abolishing the slave trade (African Slave Trade Treaty Act).
1862	(Spain) Spanish Cuba	Slave trade abolished.
1862	United States	Nathaniel Gordon becomes the only person hanged in U.S. history "for being engaged in the slave trade".
1863	United States	Lincoln issues the Emancipation Proclamation, freeing all slaves in Confederate-controlled areas. Most slaves in "border states" are freed by state action, and a separate law frees the slaves in Washington, D.C.
1863	Netherlands	Slavery abolished in the colonies, emancipating 33,000 slaves in Surinam, 12,000 in Curaçao and Dependencies, and an indeterminate number in the East Indies.
1863	(Denmark) Iceland	Exemptions introduced to serfdom under the Vistarband system.
1863	Chatham Islands	Slavery abolished.
1864	Congress Poland	Serfdom abolished.
1865	United States	Slavery and involuntary servitude abolished, except as punishment for crime, by the Thirteenth Amendment to the United States Constitution. It frees all remaining slaves, about 40,000, in the border slave states that did not secede. Thirty out of thirty-six states vote to ratify it; New Jersey, Delaware, Kentucky, and Mississippi vote against. Mississippi does not officially ratify it until 2013.
1865	Texas	Juneteenth: U.S. General Gordon Granger proclaims the end of slavery in Galveston.
1865	Spain	Spanish Abolitionist Society founded in Madrid by Julio Vizcarrondo, José Julián Acosta and Joaquín Sanromá.
1866	Oklahoma	Slavery abolished. U.S. government treaties with the Five Tribes that governed the Indian Territory, which previously allied with the Confederacy, required them to abolish slavery for renewed U.S. recognition of their continued independence.
1866	Iowa	Thirteenth Amendment ratified.
1866	New Jersey	Thirteenth Amendment ratified.
1867	Spain	Law of Repression and Punishment of the Slave Trade.
1867	United States	Peonage Act of 1867, mostly targeting use of Native American peons in New Mexico Territory. Slavery among native tribes in Alaska was abolished after the purchase from Russia in 1867.
1868	(Spain) Spanish Cuba	Carlos Manuel de Céspedes and other independence leaders free their slaves and proclaim the independence of Cuba, starting the Ten Years War.
1869	Portugal	Louis I abolishes slavery in all Portuguese territories and colonies.
1869	Paraguay	Slavery abolished.
1870	Spain	Amidst great opposition from the Cuban and Puerto Rican planters, Segismundo Moret drafts a "Law of Free Wombs" that frees children of slaves, slaves older than 65 years, and slaves serving in the Spanish Army, beginning in 1872.
1870	Texas	Thirteenth Amendment ratified.
1871	(Empire of Brazil) Brazil	Rio Branco Law (Law of Free Birth) declares the children born to slave mothers free.
1871	Japan	Abolition of the han system or Japanese feudalism.
1873	United Kingdom	Slave Trade Act 1873
1873	Puerto Rico	Slavery abolished.
1873	United Kingdom; Zanzibar; Madagascar	Triple treaty abolishing the slave trade.
1874	Gold Coast	Slavery abolished.
1877	(Khedivate of Egypt) Egypt	The Anglo-Egyptian Slave Trade Convention abolishes the slave trade gradually in 1877–1884. This also gradually abolishes slavery itself over the next decades.
1879	Bulgaria	Slavery abolished with independence. The Constitution states that any slave that enters Bulgarian territory is immediately freed.
1880	Ottoman Empire	The Anglo-Ottoman Convention of 1880 prohibits the Red Sea slave trade and gives the British the right to stop all slave ships in Ottoman waters.
1882	Ottoman Empire	A firman emancipates all slaves.
1884	Cambodia	Slavery abolished.
1885	(Empire of Brazil) Brazil	Saraiva-Cotegipe Law passed, freeing all slaves over the age of 60 and creating other measures for the gradual abolition of slavery, such as a Manumissions Fund administered by the State.
1886	(Spain) Spanish Cuba	Slavery abolished.
1886	(Spain) Spanish Philippines	Slavery abolished.
1888	(Empire of Brazil) Brazil	Slavery abolished.
1889	(Kingdom of Italy) Italy	An Italian court finds that Josephine Bakhita was never legally enslaved according to Italian, British, or Egyptian law and is a free woman.
1889	Ottoman Empire	The Kanunname of 1889 prohibits African slavery and the slave trade in the Ottoman Empire.
1890	United Kingdom; France; Germany; Portugal (Congo Free State) Congo (Kingdom of Italy) Italy; Spain; Netherlands; Belgium; Russia; Austria-Hungary; Sweden-Norway; Denmark; United States; Ottoman Empire; Zanzibar Persia	Brussels Conference Act – a collection of anti-slavery measures to put an end to the slave trade on land and sea, especially in the Congo Basin, the Ottoman Empire, and the East African coast.
1894	(Korean Empire) Korea	Slavery abolished, but it survives in practice until 1930.
1894	(Denmark) Iceland	Vistarband effectively abolished (but not de jure).
1895	Taiwan	Taiwan is annexed by Japan, where slavery has been abolished.
1895	Egypt	Slavery abolished.
1895	Italian Somaliland	First slaves freed
1896	Madagascar	Slavery abolished.
1897	Zanzibar	Slavery abolished except for concubines (abolished in 1909).
1897	(Thailand) Siam	Slave trade abolished.
1897	(Ottoman Empire) Bassora	Children of freedmen issued separate certificates of liberation to avoid enslavement and separation from their parents.
1899	(France) Ndzuwani	Slavery abolished.

== 1900–1949 ==
Date	Jurisdiction	Description
1900	(United States) Guam	Slavery abolished 22 February 1900, by proclamation of Richard P. Leary.
1901	Delaware	Thirteenth Amendment ratified.
1902	Cameroon	Gradual abolition of slavery.
1903	French Sudan	"Slave" no longer used as an administrative category.
1904	United Kingdom; Germany; Denmark; Spain; France (Kingdom of Italy) Italy; Netherlands; Portugal; Russia	International Agreement for the suppression of the White Slave Traffic signed in Paris. Only France, the Netherlands and Russia extend the treaty to the whole extent of their colonial empires with immediate effect, and Italy extends it to Eritrea but not to Italian Somaliland.
1904	British East Africa	Slavery abolished.
1905	French West Africa	Slavery formally abolished. Though up to one million slaves gain their freedom, slavery continues to exist in practice for decades afterward.
1906	China	Slavery abolished beginning on 31 January 1910. Adult slaves are converted into hired laborers and the minors freed upon reaching age 25.
1906	Barotseland	Slavery abolished.
1908	Ottoman Empire	The Young Turk Revolution eradicates the open trade of Zanj and Circassian women from Constantinople.
1908	Congo Free State	Belgium annexes the Congo Free State, ending the practice of slavery there.
1912	(Thailand) Siam	Slavery abolished.
1915	(Malaysia) British Malaya	Slavery abolished.
1917	British Raj	Indian indenture system abolished.
1918	United States	Supreme Court rules in Arver v. United States that the 13th Amendment prohibition against involuntary servitude does not apply to conscription. The government can constitutionally force people to serve in the military against their will.
1919	Tanganyika	Slavery abolished.
1922	Morocco	Slave trade abolished, slave holding remained legal.
1923	Afghanistan	The Emirate of Afghanistan abolishes slavery
1923	Florida	Convict lease abolished after the death of Martin Tabert, who was whipped for being too ill to work.
1923	Hong Kong	Slavery of Mui tsai abolished.
1924	(Kingdom of Iraq) Iraq	Slavery abolished.
1924	Anglo-Egyptian Sudan	Slavery abolished
1924	League of Nations	Temporary Slavery Commission appointed.
1924	Turkey	Slavery abolished
1926	Nepal	Slavery abolished.
1926	League of Nations	Convention to Suppress the Slave Trade and Slavery.
1926	(United Kingdom) British Burma	Slavery abolished.
1926	United Kingdom	Law of Property Act 1925.
1927	Spain	1926 Slavery Convention ratified.
1927	United Kingdom (Najd) Nejd; Hejaz	Treaty of Jeddah (1927) abolishing the slave trade.
1928	Sierra Leone	Abolition of domestic slavery practised by local African elites. Although established as a place for freed slaves, a study found practices of domestic slavery still widespread in rural areas in the 1970s.
1928	Alabama	Convict lease abolished, the last state in the Union to do so.
1929	Persia	Slavery abolished and criminalized.
1930	League of Nations	Forced Labour Convention.
1930	League of Nations	Forced Labour (Indirect Compulsion) Recommendation
1930	League of Nations	Forced Labour (Regulation) Recommendation
1932	League of Nations	Committee of Experts on Slavery appointed.
1934	League of Nations	Advisory Committee of Experts on Slavery appointed.
1935	(Ethiopian Empire) Ethiopia	The invading Italian General Emilio De Bono claims to have abolished slavery in the Ethiopian Empire.
1936	League of Nations	Elimination of Recruiting Recommendation
1936	Northern Nigeria	Slavery abolished.
1936	(United Kingdom) Bechuanaland	Slavery abolished.
1937	Bahrain	Slavery abolished.
1937	League of Nations	Public Works (International Co-operation) Recommendation
1941	United States	Franklin D. Roosevelt signs Circular 3591 abolishing all forms of convict leasing.
1945	Occupied Germany	Millions of forced labourers and slaves are freed after the fall of the Third Reich; see forced labour under German rule during World War II.
1945	Japanese Empire	Millions of forced labourers and sex slaves are freed after the defeat of the Japanese Empire; see comfort women, rōmusha, East Asia Development Board.
1946	Occupied Germany	Fritz Sauckel, Nazi official responsible for procuring forced labor in occupied Europe during World War II, is convicted of crimes against humanity and hanged.
1946	French Sudan	Beginning of large slave defections encouraged by the French Fourth Republic and the Sudanese Union – African Democratic Rally party.
1948	United Nations	Article 4 of the Universal Declaration of Human Rights declares slavery contrary to human rights.
1949	Kuwait	Slavery abolished.

== 1950–1999 ==
Date	Jurisdiction	Description
1950	United Nations	Ad Hoc Committee on Slavery.
1952	Qatar	Slavery abolished.
1953	Australia; Canada; Liberia; New Zealand; South Africa; Switzerland; United Kingdom	1926 Slavery Convention ratified.
1954	Afghanistan; Austria; Cuba; Denmark; Egypt; Finland; India; Italy; Mexico; Monaco; Sweden; Syria	1926 Slavery Convention ratified.
1955	Ecuador (Kingdom of Greece) Greece (Kingdom of Iraq) Iraq; Israel; Netherlands; Pakistan; Philippines; Republic of China (Taiwan); Turkey	1926 Slavery Convention ratified.
1956	United Nations	Supplementary Convention on the Abolition of Slavery.
1956	(Byelorussian Soviet Socialist Republic) Byelorussia; Soviet Union; United States; South Vietnam	1926 Slavery Convention ratified.
1957	United Nations	The Abolition of Forced Labour Convention eliminates some exceptions admitted in the 1930 Forced Labour Convention.
1957	Albania; Libya; Burma; Norway; Romania; Sudan	1926 Slavery Convention ratified.
1958	Bhutan	Slavery abolished.
1958	Hungary; Ceylon	1926 Slavery Convention ratified.
1959	Jordan; Morocco (Ukrainian Soviet Socialist Republic) Ukraine	1926 Slavery Convention ratified.
1960	Niger	Slavery abolished.
1960	Mali	First president Modibo Keita makes the effective abolition of slavery a prominent goal of the government. However, his efforts are largely abandoned during the dictatorship of Moussa Traoré (1968–1991).
1961	Nigeria	1926 Slavery Convention ratified.
1961	Morocco	Slavery abolished under Moroccan Constitution, although domestic slave practices continued.
1962	Saudi Arabia	Slavery abolished.
1962	North Yemen	Slavery abolished.
1962	Belgium; Sierra Leone; Tanganyika	1926 Slavery Convention ratified.
1963	Algeria; France; Guinea; Kuwait; Nepal	1926 Slavery Convention ratified.
1964	Trucial States	Slavery abolished. (Note: Except Abu Dhabi, the rest of the Trucial States officially abolished slavery by a joint declaration in 1956. Abu Dhabi officially abolished it in 1963.)
1964	Jamaica; Madagascar; Niger; Uganda	1926 Slavery Convention ratified.
1965	Malawi	1926 Slavery Convention ratified.
1966	Brazil; Malta; Trinidad and Tobago; Tunisia	1926 Slavery Convention ratified.
1966	United Nations	International Covenant on Civil and Political Rights.
1966	United Nations	First Optional Protocol to the International Covenant on Civil and Political Rights.
1967	South Yemen	Slavery abolished.
1968	Mongolia	1926 Slavery Convention ratified.
1969	(Ethiopian Empire) Ethiopia; Mauritius	1926 Slavery Convention ratified.
1970	Oman	Slavery abolished.
1972	Fiji	1926 Slavery Convention ratified.
1973	West Germany; Mali; Saudi Arabia; Zambia	1926 Slavery Convention ratified.
1974	Lesotho	1926 Slavery Convention ratified.
1976	Bahamas; Barbados	1926 Slavery Convention ratified.
1976	Kentucky	Thirteenth Amendment ratified.
1979	Equatorial Guinea	Slavery is abolished with the overthrow of dictator Francisco Macias Nguema
1981	Mauritania	Slavery abolished, though the ban is not enforced and many people continued to be held as slaves. Mauritania was the last country to legally abolish slavery, making the practice illegal worldwide.
1981	Saint Vincent and the Grenadines; Solomon Islands	1926 Slavery Convention ratified.
1982	Papua New Guinea	1926 Slavery Convention ratified.
1983	Bolivia; Guatemala	1926 Slavery Convention ratified.
1984	Cameroon	1926 Slavery Convention ratified.
1985	Bangladesh	1926 Slavery Convention ratified.
1986	Cyprus; Mauritania; Nicaragua	1926 Slavery Convention ratified.
1987	North Yemen	1926 Slavery Convention ratified.
1990	Bahrain; Saint Lucia	1926 Slavery Convention ratified.
1992	Croatia	1926 Slavery Convention ratified.
1993	Bosnia and Herzegovina	1926 Slavery Convention ratified.
1994	Dominica	1926 Slavery Convention ratified.
1995	Chile	1926 Slavery Convention ratified.
1995	Mississippi	The Mississippi Legislature unanimously votes to ratify the Thirteenth Amendment to the United States Constitution after a clerk discovers it never had. It is the last eligible state in the union to do so. However, state officials fail to send the required documentation to the state register.
1996	Azerbaijan	1926 Slavery Convention ratified.
1997	Kyrgyzstan; Turkmenistan	1926 Slavery Convention ratified.
1998	Ghana	Forced ritual servitude of girls in Ewe shrines banned.
1998	United Nations	Rome Statute

== 2000–present ==
Date	Jurisdiction	Description
2001	(Serbia and Montenegro) Yugoslavia; Uruguay	1926 Slavery Convention ratified.
2003	Niger	Slavery criminalized.
2006	Montenegro	1926 Slavery Convention ratified.
2006	Mali	Temedt, an organization against slavery and the discrimination of former slaves, is founded in Essakane.
2007	Mauritania	Slavery criminalized.
2007	Paraguay	1926 Slavery Convention ratified.
2008	Kazakhstan	1926 Slavery Convention ratified.
2009	United Kingdom	Section 71 of the Coroners and Justice Act 2009.
2010	Sahrawi Arab Democratic Republic	Slavery criminalized.
2013	Mississippi	Ratification of the Thirteenth Amendment legally recorded.
2014	United Nations	Protocol of 2014 to the Forced Labour Convention
2014	United Nations	Forced Labour (Supplementary Measures) Recommendation
2015	United Kingdom	Modern Slavery Act 2015.
2017	Navajo Nation	Criminalization of human trafficking.
2017	Chad	Slavery criminalized.
2018	Colorado	Prison exception removed from Colorado's constitutional ban on slavery.
2019	Iraq; Syria	Defeat and debellatio of the Islamic State of Iraq and the Levant leads to the freeing of thousands of slaves, including Yazidi and Christian sex slaves.
2020	Utah; Nebraska	Prison exception removed from both states' constitutional ban on slavery.
2022	Alabama; Oregon; Tennessee; Vermont	Prison exception removed from the states' constitutional ban on slavery.
2024	Nevada	Prison exception removed from Nevada's constitutional ban on slavery.
2026	France	National Assembly approved a Bill repealing Code Noir.Senate approved a Bill repealing Code Noir

Today, slavery is abolished de jure worldwide, but de facto practices akin to it continue today in many places throughout the world.

== See also ==
- Abolitionism
- History of slavery
- List of abolitionist forerunners (by Thomas Clarkson)
- Reparations for slavery
- Slave Trade Acts
- Sexual slavery
- Slavery at common law
- Slavery in modern Africa
- Slavery in the 21st century
- Timeline of the civil rights movement
