= Black Death in Denmark =

Aspect of the Black Death

1346–1353 spread of the Black Death in Europe map

The Black Death was present in Denmark between 1348 and 1350. The Black Death in Denmark is the least documented of all the Nordic countries, with the exception of Finland.

== Background ==
=== Denmark in the mid-14th century ===
Prior to the Black Death, Denmark was the smallest of the Nordic countries, but it had the largest population, between 750.000 and one million people.

=== The Black Death ===
Since the outbreak of the Black Death at the Crimea, it had reached Sicily by an Italian ship from the Crimea. After having spread across the Italian states, and from Italy to France from France to England, the plague reached Norway by a ship from England in 1349. In parallel, it was migrating North toward Denmark from Germany in the Holy Roman Empire.

== Plague migration ==
According to traditional legend, the Black Death came to Denmark when a Norwegian plague ship from England stranded on Vendsyssel on Northern Jylland after all of its crew had died. The plague years for Denmark are traditionally attributed as 1348–1349, because the Zealand Chronicle recorded these years as the plague years.

Whether the story of the plague ship is accurate is impossible to know, but the dates are not considered probable in modern research. The Zealand Chronicle was written over ten years later and may have gotten the dates wrong, as they are not supported by other contemporary traces of the Black Death. The Chronicle of the Archbishop of Lund as well as the Annales Scanici from Scania both date the year of the Black Death as 1350. In contrast to the Zealand Chronicle they are contemporary, and it is not likely that the Black Death could have arrived to such a small country as Denmark in 1348 and took two years to progress through it.

There are no contemporary witness statements from the Black Death in Denmark, but it is possible to trace the plague migration indirectly through donations, wills and occasional death lists, and according to these, the Black Death was present in Ribe on Jylland in July–October 1350, in Roskilde on Zealand in September–October, in Copenhagen in August–September and in Scania in July–December.

== Consequences ==
The death toll is not possible to estimate. It is clear that Denmark experienced a demographic shock that took centuries to recover from. This is clearly visible from material during the years after the plague.

=== Economic, social and political effects ===
Bishop Peter of Ribe mentions in a letter from 1352 that the income from agriculture had deteriorated and that this problem was not likely to become any better any time soon. In 1354, the king pardoned an unusually large number of people from the death penalty with reference to the fact that the population had already diminished too much from the plague.

In many parts of Denmark, the devastation is clear by deserted farms: in 1400, 34 of 48 farms under the Bröndum estate in Himmerland on Jylland was deserted, and in 1427 the region Hasle near Århus gave but a third of the income from agriculture that it had done prior to the Black Death. Many churches were also abandoned during the same time.

The diminishing population caused by the Black Death resulted in the introduction of serfdom in Denmark, the Vornedskab, which was introduced after the Black Death.
