= Vornedskab =

14-century Danish institution

The vornedskab was a serfdom-like institution introduced in Denmark in the late 14th-century to ensure a working force for the landowners in a time period when the population had diminished after the Black Death in Denmark, and the landowners wanted to prevent the remaining peasantry from achieving better conditions or leaving the countryside for the cities. It was abolished in 1702. In 1733, serfdom was reintroduced in Denmark under the new name stavnsbånd.
