= Human trafficking in Bahrain =

Bahrain ratified the 2000 UN TIP Protocol in June 2004.

In 2023, the Organised Crime Index gave the country a score of 8 out of 10 for human trafficking, noting an increase in the number of victims.

Bahrain is a source and destination country for men and women subjected to trafficking in persons, specifically forced labor and forced prostitution. Men and women from India, Pakistan, Nepal, Sri Lanka, Bangladesh, Indonesia, Thailand, the Philippines, Ethiopia, and Eritrea migrate voluntarily to Bahrain to work as domestic workers or as unskilled laborers in the construction and service industries. Some, however, face conditions of forced labor after arriving in Bahrain, through use of such practices as unlawful withholding of passports, restrictions on movement, contract substitution, non-payment of wages, threats, and physical or sexual abuse.

A study by the Bahrain Government's Labor Market Regulatory Authority (LMRA) found that 65 percent of migrant workers had not seen their employment contract, and that 89 percent were unaware of their terms of employment upon arrival in Bahrain. Many labor recruitment agencies in Bahrain and source countries require workers to pay high recruitment fees - a practice that makes workers highly vulnerable to forced labor once in Bahrain. The LMRA study found that 70 percent of foreign workers borrowed money or sold property in their home countries in order to secure a job in Bahrain.

Some Bahraini employers illegally charge workers exorbitant fees to remain in Bahrain working for third-party employers (under the “free visa” arrangement). The LMRA estimates that approximately 10 percent of migrant workers were in Bahrain under illegal “free visa” arrangements - a practice that can contribute to debt bondage - while the Bahrain Chamber of Commerce and Industry puts the figure at 25 percent. Women from Thailand, the Philippines, Morocco, Jordan, Syria, Lebanon, Russia, China, Vietnam, South Korea and Eastern European States are subjected to forced prostitution in Bahrain.

== U.S. State Department reports ==
The U.S. State Department's Office to Monitor and Combat Trafficking in Persons placed the country in Tier 3 during the 2007 report. It was elevated to Tier 2 after the report noted the significant improvement particularly in satisfying the minimum standards for the elimination of trafficking. By 2010, it remained in the Tier 2 category but the watch list designation was dropped. In 2010 the Government of Bahrain fully complied with the minimum standards for the elimination of trafficking; however, it made significant efforts to do so. The government reported its second and third prosecutions under its anti-trafficking statute, and continued to educate potential trafficking victims on their rights. However, the government did not show evidence of progress in providing protective services to victims or prosecuting offenses related to labor trafficking, the most prevalent form of trafficking in Bahrain.

There are sectors within the country that views the human trafficking report and the initiative to improve the performance against human tracking as an intrusion to Bahrain's domestic affairs. On the other hand, there are also those who argue that these commitments allow Bahrain to burnish its credentials as a model state in the Middle East, particularly with respect to its responses to the human tracking problem.

The country was placed at "Tier 1" in 2018, and remained at Tier 1 in 2023.

== Prosecution (2010) ==
The Government of Bahrain made some progress in conducting anti-trafficking law enforcement efforts during the year. The 2008 Law to Combat Trafficking in Persons prohibits all forms of trafficking in persons and prescribes penalties ranging from three to 15 years’ imprisonment, which are sufficiently stringent and commensurate with those prescribed for other serious crimes, such as rape.

The Bahrain government reported two new prosecutions and one new investigation under the anti-trafficking law in the reporting period; all three of these cases involved sex trafficking. One of the prosecutions involved a Bahraini employee of the Ministry of Interior and a Thai national accused of trafficking Asian women into prostitution. The other involved a Bahraini and a Russian national accused of trafficking Russian women. Furthermore, two Bahraini nationals were sentenced to life imprisonment in April and October 2009 for murdering their Indonesian and Ethiopian housemaids, respectively; the government reported that these cases contained elements of human trafficking. The government did not criminally prosecute any employers or labor agents for forced labor of migrant laborers, including domestic workers.

There is some indication that government officials may be involved in human trafficking. NGOs and laborers assert that Bahraini officials provide Bahrainis with authorization to sponsor more expatriate workers than they could reasonably employ, and that in their private capacities, some officials illegally engage in “free visa” arrangements and withhold employees’ passports and salaries. The Royal Police Academy provided new police recruits with specific instruction on identifying trafficking victims during the reporting period. In addition, 29 law enforcement officers participated in a three-day trafficking-related investigations course run by International Organization for Migration (IOM), one of several anti-trafficking programs run by IOM in partnership with the Government of Bahrain. In early 2010, the Government of Bahrain centralized all trafficking-related prosecutions within the office of the Chief Prosecutor for the Manama district.

== Protection (2010) ==
The Government of Bahrain made no discernible progress in improving protective services available to trafficking victims over the last year. The government continued to lack a formal procedure to identify victims among vulnerable groups, such as migrant domestic workers who have left their employers or women arrested for prostitution. As a result, potential trafficking victims may have been charged with employment or immigration violations, detained, and deported without adequate protection. Most migrant workers who were able to flee their abusive employers were frequently charged as “runaways,” sentenced to two weeks’ detention, and deported. The government does not ensure that victims receive access to essential protective services, except for the very small number referred to the government's primary shelter.

The 120-bed government-funded, NGO-run Dar Al Aman shelter provided shelter to a small number of trafficking victims. The majority of victims continued to seek shelter at their embassies or at the Migrant Workers Protection Society's shelter. The Dar Al Aman shelter does not advertise that it accepts trafficking victims, and many police officers were unfamiliar with procedures for referring victims of labor abuse and human trafficking. An international NGO reported that the shelter restricted residents’ freedom of movement, was not staffed with qualified personnel, and did not provide long-term shelter or housing benefits to victims.

There is a restrictive intake process for non-Bahraini victims; however, in January 2010, the government's inter-ministerial anti-trafficking committee indicated that it instructed police and prosecutors to refer any abused female worker to the shelter, regardless of signs of abuse. There are no shelters for male trafficking victims or abused or runaway workers.

The three trafficking victims who the government identified during the reporting period were referred to the Dar Al Aman shelter and received legal, medical, and psychological services. The government of Bahrain encouraged victims to participate in the investigation and prosecution of traffickers. However, discouraged workers typically did not file court cases against employers due to fear or ignorance of the law, distrust of the legal system, inability to afford legal representation, lack of interpretation/translation, fear of losing residency permits during legal proceedings, and to avoid additional maltreatment at the hands of the employer. The government does not provide legal alternatives for the removal of foreign victims to countries where they face retribution or hardship. The Ministry of Interior established a toll-free hotline in January 2010 for trafficking victims, although NGOs report that news of the hotline has not been widely disseminated.

== Prevention (2010) ==
The government made limited progress in preventing human trafficking over the reporting period. While Bahrain's Ministry of Labor has pledged to end the sponsorship (kafala) system, foreign workers remain tied to a Bahraini sponsor.

The government implemented reforms in August 2009 which designated the Labor Market Regulatory Authority as the lead agency for granting work permits to foreign workers, and expanding labor mobility for expatriate workers, under certain conditions. These reforms do not cover Bahrain's approximately 70,000 domestic workers - the group that is most vulnerable to trafficking. Another labor market reform limited the number of foreign workers small businesses many sponsor, which the LMRA states will cut back on illegal “free visa” arrangements and other labor abuses.

The parliament's upper house recently approved a new labor law; however, it does not afford basic protections to domestic workers - the group most vulnerable to human trafficking. Moreover, the law against withholding workers’ passports - a common practice that restricts the mobility of migrant workers and contributes to forced labor - was not enforced effectively, and the practice remained widespread. The LMRA continued to distribute pamphlets - prepared in coordination with the IOM - that explained how to legally obtain, maintain and switch a work visa, and provided contact details to report suspected labor violations.

The LMRA also sponsored a Hindi radio show designed to raise awareness of workers’ rights. The government closed down a number of low-end hotels associated with organized prostitution. The government continued to provide financial support towards an IOM anti-trafficking capacity building program. The government does not have a National Plan of Action to address trafficking in persons. The Ministry of Foreign Affairs’ Undersecretary chaired an inter-ministerial committee that coordinates policies designed to combat trafficking. This committee convenes every other month on average, and includes government ministries, NGOs, and the Bahrain Women's Union. The Ministry of Labor, which deals with most workers’ complaints, is currently not represented on this committee.

== See also ==
- Human rights in Bahrain
- Slavery in Bahrain
