= Slavery in Bahrain =

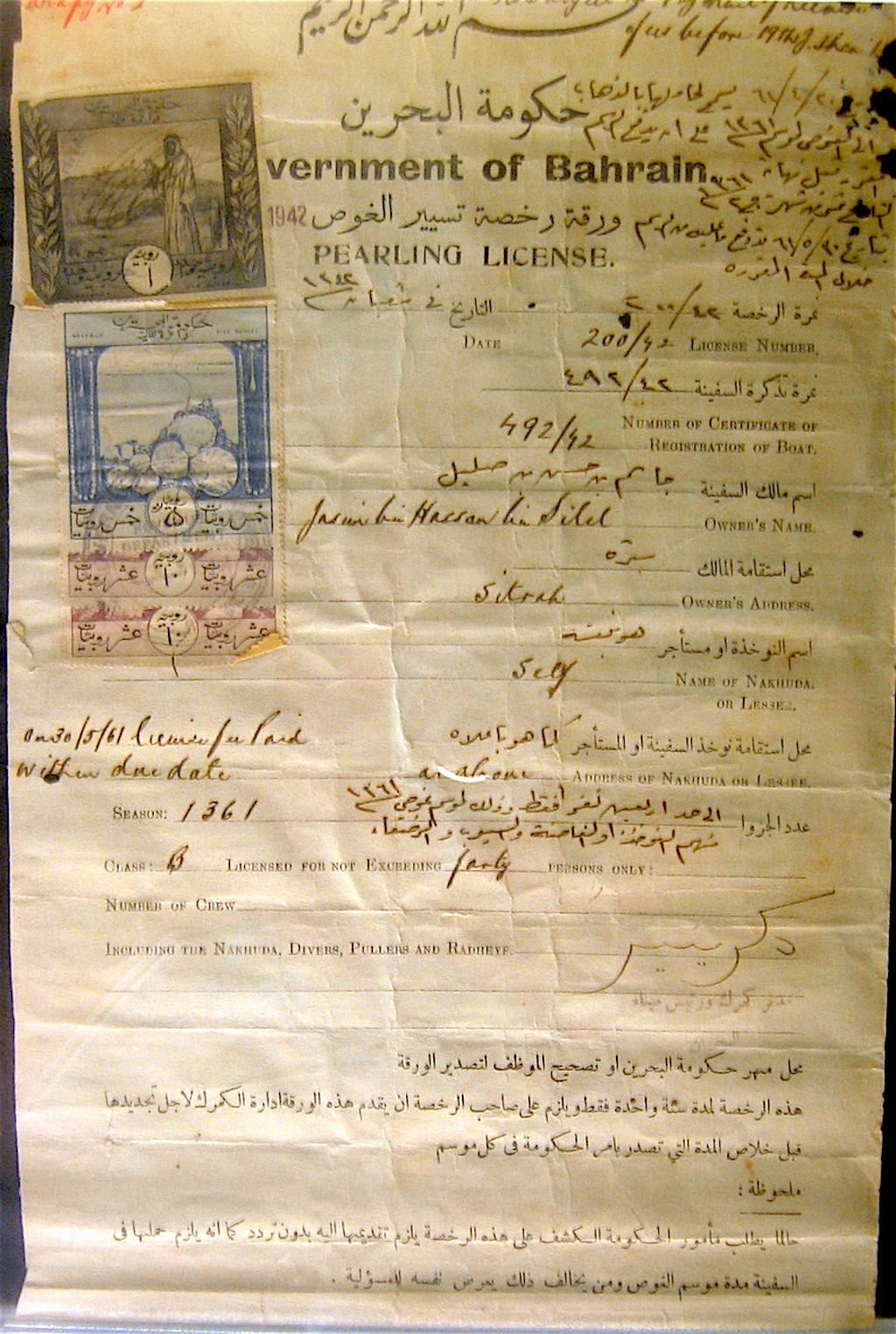
Bahrain Pearling License 1942. In the 1940s, the laborers of the Pearl industry was dominated by slaves.

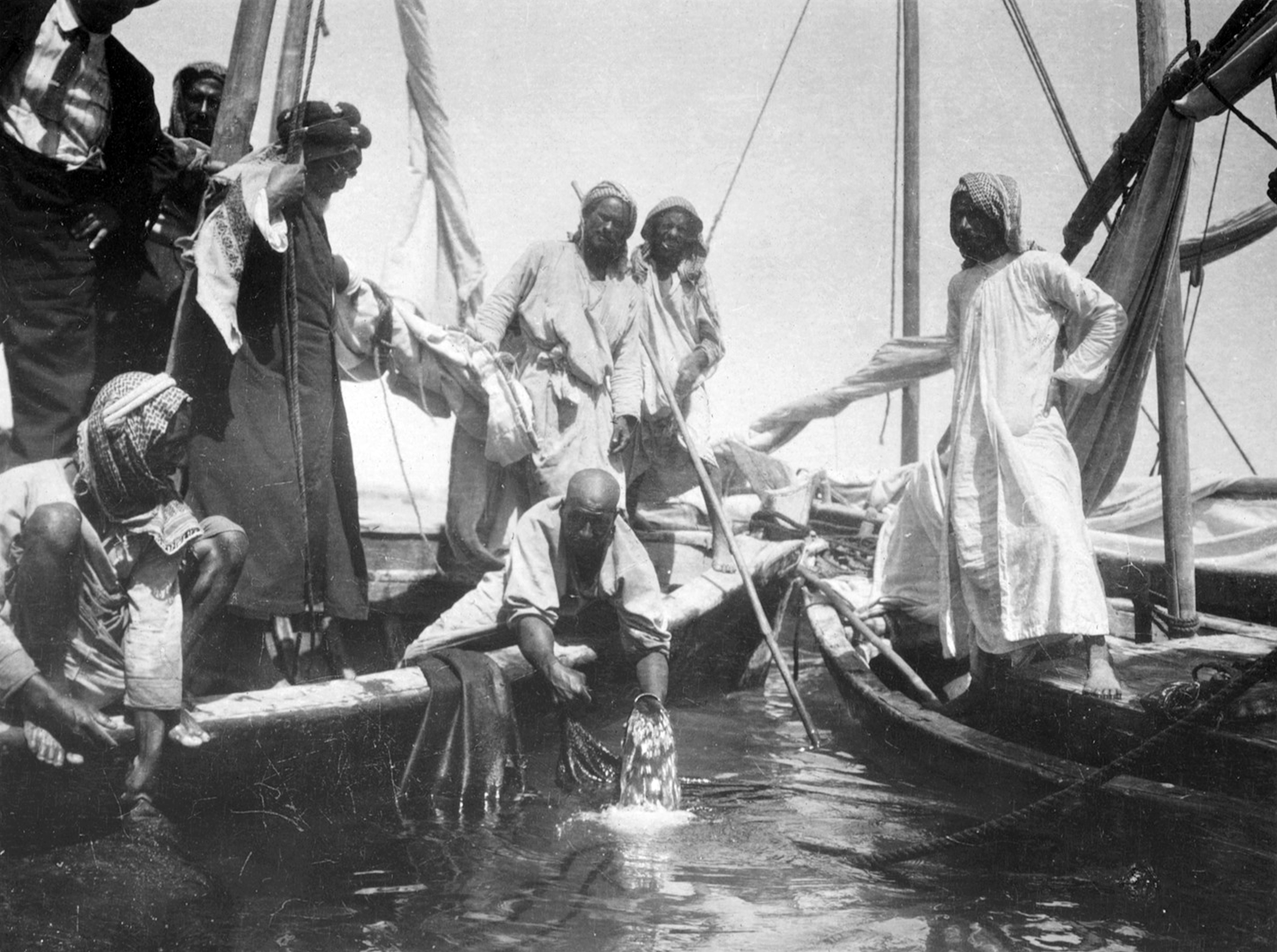
Pearl diving in Bahrain, March 1911. At the time, the laborers of the Pearl industry was dominated by slaves.

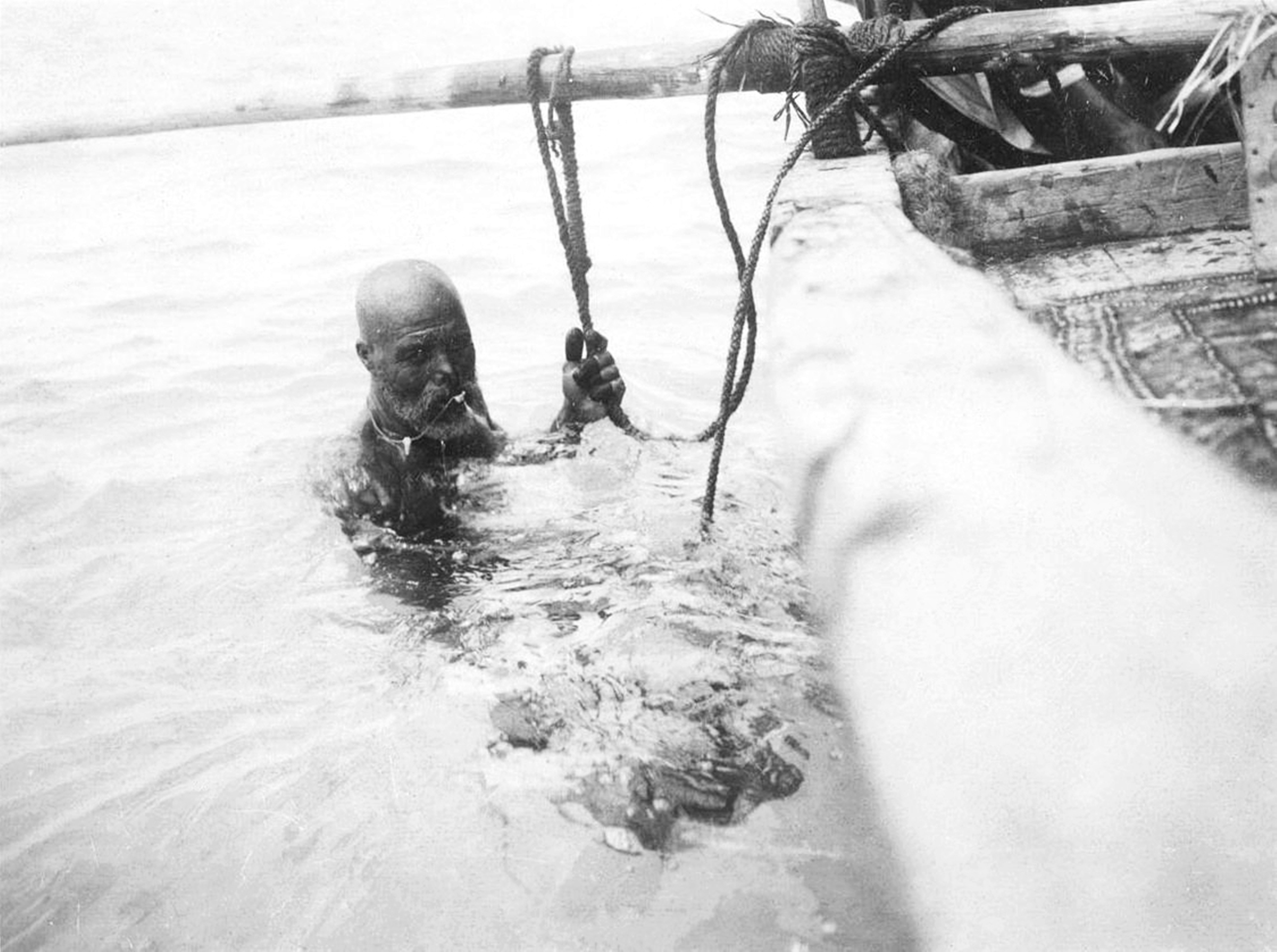
Pearl diving in Bahrain, March 1911. At the time, the laborers of the Pearl industry was dominated by slaves.

Open slavery existed in Bahrain until the 1930s. Slavery was formally abolished in Bahrain in 1937. Slavery ended earlier in Bahrain than in any other Gulf state, with the exception of Iran and Iraq. Many members of the Afro-Arabian minority are descendants of the former slaves. Slavery of people from Africa and East Asia was succeeded by the modern Kafala system of poor workers from the same region were slaves had previously been imported.

== History ==
In the 1890s, the British Empire gained control of Bahrain. However, the British did not interfere with the inner policy of the state, but was content with keeping peace with the indigenous power holders, protecting British citizens, and managing the contacts with the international community, in which they assured that Bahrain obeyed the same international treaties signed by the British themselves.

=== Slave trade ===
During the Omani Empire (1692–1856), Oman was a center of the Zanzibar slave trade. Slaves were trafficked from the Swahili coast of East Africa via Zanzibar to Oman. From Oman, the slaves were exported to the rest of the Arabian Peninsula and Persia, including the Trucial States, Qatar, Bahrain and Kuwait. The Omani slave trade from Africa started to shrink in the late 19th century.

A second route of slave trade existed, with people from both Africa and East Asia, who were smuggled to Jeddah in the Arabian Peninsula in connection to the Muslim pilgrimage, Hajj, to Mecca and Medina. Victims were tricked to perform the journey willingly in the belief that they were going on the Hajj pilgrimage, or employed as servants, and then sold upon arrival. These slaves were then exported from the Hejaz to Oman, the Trucial States, Qatar, Bahrain and Kuwait.

In the 1940s, a third slave trade route was noted, in which people from Balochistan were shipped across the Persian Gulf, many of whom had sold themselves or their children to escape poverty. In 1943, it was reported that girls from Balochistan were shipped via Oman and the Trucial States to Mecca, where they were popular as concubines, since Caucasian girls were no longer available, and were sold for $350–450.

=== Function and conditions ===
==== Female slaves ====
Female slaves were primarily used as either domestic servants, or as concubines (sex slaves), while male slaves were primarily used within the pearl industry as pearl divers.

Black African women were primarily used as domestic house slaves rather than exclusively for sexual services, while white Caucasian women (normally Circassian or Georgian) were preferred as concubines (sex slaves); when the main slave route of white slave girls became harder to access after Russia's conquest of the Caucasus and Central Asia in the mid 19th-century, Baluchi and "Red" Ethiopian (Oromo and Sidamo) women became the preferred targets for sexual slavery. Non-African female slaves were sold in the Persian Gulf where they were bought for marriage; these were fewer and often Armenian, Georgian, or from Baluchistan and India. In 1924, the law prohibited the enslavement of white girls (normally Armenian or Georgian) on Kuwaiti territory, but in 1928 at least 60 white slave girls were discovered.

Female slaves were often used for sexual services as concubines for a period of time, and then sold or married off to other slaves; the slave owners would arranged both marriages and divorce for their slaves, and the offspring of two slaves would become slaves in turn. It was common for slave owners to claim sexual services of married female slaves when the slave husband was away for long periods of time, to hunt for pearls or fish or similar labor, and sexual abuse was a common reason given when female slaves applied for manumission at the British Agency. It was common for Arab men to use the sexual services of enslaved African women, but a male African slave who had sexual relations with a local "pure blood" Arab woman would be executed to preserve tribal honor and social status, regardless if the couple had married or not.

The number of female slaves in the Gulf was as high or higher than that of male slaves, but the number of female slaves who made applications for manumission at the British Agencies in the Gulf was significantly lower (only 280 of 950 documented cases in 1921–1946), likely because in the Islamic society of the Gulf, were women were excluded from wage labour and public life, it was impossible for a freedwoman to survive without a male protector.

The British officially reported that 46 domestic slaves had been manumitted in Bahrain in 1929–1930.

==== Male slaves ====
Agricultural labor in the medieval Islamic world mostly consisted of paid labour, but slaves were used for agricultural labor in 11th-century Bahrain during the Karmatian state.

Male slaves where used in a number of tasks: as soldiers, pearl divers, farm labourers, cash crop workers, maritime sailors, dock workers, porters, irrigation canal workers, fishermen, and domestic servants.

== Activism against slave trade ==
The British Empire, having signed the 1926 Slavery Convention, was obliged to fight slavery and slave trade in all land under direct or indirect control of the British Empire. Since Bahrain were formally under British control, the British were expected to enforce this policy in the region. Officially, the British declared that they did just that, but in reality, the slavery and slave trade was tolerated by the British.

The British considered their control over the region insufficient to do something about the slavery and the slave trade. The British India Office advised the British authorities that any attempts to enforce any anti slavery treaty in the region could cause economic and political unrest, since slavery was "deeply rooted in religious and political history". The British policy was therefore to assure the League of Nations that Qatar followed the same anti slavery treaties signed by the British, but in parallel prevent any international observations of the area, which would disprove these claims.

In both 1932 and 1935, the British colonial authorities refused to interfere in the slavery of the Trucial States, Qatar, Bahrain and Kuwait, since they were afraid that they could lose control over the area if they should attempt to enforce a policy against slavery, and they therefore prevented all international observations of the area which could force them to take action.

In 1932, the official report of the India Office to the Committee of Experts on Slavery claimed that slavery in Bahrain was limited to house slaves and that 46 slaves had been manumitted in 1929–1930.

In 1935, the British authorities assured the League of Nations that with the exception of Kuwait, all the British controlled states by the Persian Gulf, such as the Trucial States, Qatar and Bahrain, had banned the slave trade due to treaties with the British, but while at the same time, the British refused any international inspections in the region which would have revealed that a substantional slave trade was in fact going on, especially within the pearl fish industry, were the slaves were particularly harshly treated.

In 1936, the British acknowledged in their report to the League of Nations that there was still ongoing slavery and slave trade in the Trucial States, Oman and Qatar, but claimed that it was limited; that all slaves who sought asylum at the British Agents Office in Sharjah were granted manumission and that the slave trade had stopped entirely in Kuwait and Bahrain. In reality, the British reports were deliberately playing down the size of the actual substantional slave trade going on in the region, and refused to allow international inspection.

=== Abolition ===
The ruler of Bahrain issued a proclamation formally prohibiting the owning of slaves in 1937. Bahrain was the first state in the Western Persian Gulf to ban slavery and slave trade, followed by Kuwait in 1949.

Sir George Maxwell, who produced a 'world review of slavery' for the Advisory Committee of Experts on Slavery of the League of Nations in 1936, issued pressure on the ruler of Bahrain to abolish slavery. The ruler of Bahrain saw it to be politically necessary to accommodate the wish of the British and George Maxwell and therefore banned slavery, but on the advice of his advisors, the ban was called a reminder that slavery was already banned, in order to save face.

In 1957 the British pressured the Gulf rulers to accept the 1956 Supplementary Slavery Convention in accordance with the Colonial Application; this was accepted by Kuwait, Qatar and Bahrain, but the rulers of the Trucial coast stated that such a law could not be enforced.

Many members of the Afro-Arabian minority are descendants of the former slaves.

== Modern slavery ==
=== Kafala system in Bahrain ===
After the abolition of slavery, poor migrant workers were employed under the Kafala system, which have been compared to slavery.

In Islamic adoptional jurisprudence, "kafala" refers to the adoption of children. The original law of kafala was expanded to include a system of fixed-term sponsorship of migrant workers in several countries in the late twentieth century. This modern system has its origins in labor practices related to pearl hunting. In the Persian Gulf, the pearling industry was dominated by slave labor, and prior to the abolition of slavery in the 20th-century, slaves were used as pearl divers.

In the first decades of the twenty-first century, the migrant worker system became widely referred to in English as the "kafala system". The word kafala comes from Arabic, and the related word kafeel refers to the local employment sponsor in the kafala system.

In 2009, Bahrain was the first country in the Gulf Cooperation Council (GCC) to claim to repeal the kafala system. In a public statement the Labor Minister likened the system to slavery. Changes to the Labour Market Regulatory Suggestion were made in April 2009 and implemented starting 1 August 2009. Under the new law, migrants are sponsored by the Labour Market Regulation Authority and can change from one employer to another without their employer's agreement. Three months' notice is required to quit from an employer.

However, in November 2009 Human Rights Watch (HRW) stated that "authorities do little to enforce compliance" with "employers who withhold wages and passports from migrant employees ... practices [which] are illegal under Bahraini law."

In 2009, Bahrain announced that it would end the kafala system, citing human rights concerns linked to both human trafficking and sexual slavery. The Labour Market Regulatory Law was amended, making the LMRA the official sponsor of migrant workers and, most importantly, allowing migrant workers to leave their employer without the latter's consent. In December 2016, the Bahraini government announced the official and total abolition of the sponsorship system once more.

Other legislative initiatives to protect labor rights in Bahrain include a 2012 private sector labor law, focusing inter alia on the number of sick days, annual leave, compensation for unfair dismissals, fines for labor law violations and the streamlining of labor disputes. A 2008-human trafficking law was presented by the Bahraini government as covering many common labor law violations, for example the withholding of wages. Furthermore, in late 2016 Bahrain was considering to allow the issuance of flexible work permits for undocumented workers, providing them with the ability to work for more than one employer even without legal visa.

== See also ==
- Human trafficking in Bahrain
- History of slavery in the Muslim world
- History of concubinage in the Muslim world
- Human trafficking in the Middle East
- Kafala system
