= Stavnsbånd =

Danish institution analogous to serfdom

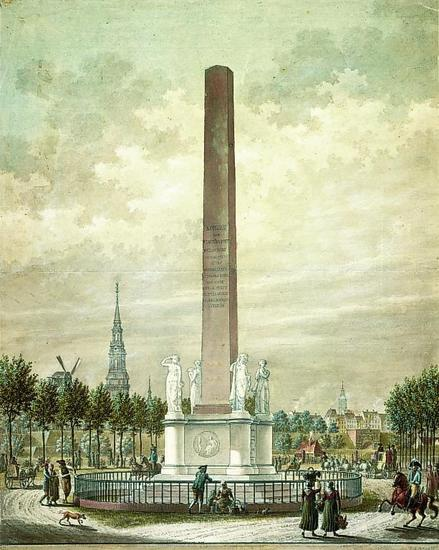
The Frihedsstøtten (lit. 'Liberty Column') in Copenhagen which was erected in 1792. The obelisk is in memory of the 1788 peasant reforms which led to the abolition of the stavnsbånd.

The stavnsbånd (lit. 'home-bondage') was a serfdom-like institution introduced in Denmark in 1733 which existed in some form until 1800. It bonded men between certain ages to live on the estate where they were born. It was possible, however, to purchase a pass from the landowner releasing one from this bondage. Thus, in practice, estate owners and their sons were not typically bound to live on their estates, but young laborers were unable to leave.

The stavnsbånd was introduced following of a crisis in 1730 where many agricultural laborers relocated to urban areas in search of a better quality of life. This led to a falling supply of farm labourers and men in the militia, which at the time were both connected to estates. The stavnsbånd was introduced in 1733 to ensure that estate owners were able to maintain a sufficient labour force to supply their own enterprise and the nation's civilian army.

Initially, men between the ages of 14 and 36 were bound to the estate they had been born, however the age range was extended to 4–40 year-olds before its abolition. The institution was gradually abolished between 1788 and the introduction of military conscription in 1848.

== Background ==
From the 14th century, a different form of serfdom existed in Denmark, known as the vornedskab which was abolished by King Frederick IV in 1702. Serfdom was re-introduced through the stavnsbånd, in part, to alleviate a serious agricultural crisis during the 1730s. Demand from Denmark's traditional export countries had plummeted and agricultural work was no longer as financially sustainable. Tenant farmers and peasants left rural areas and migrated to cities in large numbers, seeking a better living. This kind of migration had not previously been possible under the vornedskab and radically changed the labor market. As a consequence, landowners were unable to find labor to maintain their estates. The stavnsbånd was introduced into law 4 February 1733, stating principally that "No peasant may leave the estate where he was born, as long as his master can provide him with service..."

While landowners were struggling to find laborers, the military was also struggling to enlist enough men. King Christian VI had abolished the kingdom's militia in 1730. When the stavnsbånd was introduced the militia was simultaneously reinstated. Unlike the militia established by Frederick IV in 1702, this new militia was to be supplied entirely by landowners. It gave landowners the responsibility to supply a certain number of men for the militia relative to the size of their estate. If the landowner did not supply enough soldiers, they were fined by the state.

The age range affected by the stavnsbånd was extended three times; in 1735 to 14–36 years, in 1742 to 9–40 years, and in 1764 to 4–40 years. Women were not directly affected by the law and retained the freedom to relocate. Landowners petitioned the king to expand the law to also bind women to the estates on which they were born, but this was famously unsuccessful. Men within the age range of the stavnsbånd needed to have their landowner's permission to move or resettle outside of their estate. They may be permitted to purchase a pass from the landowner, but this was at the discretion of the landowner. Because the sale of these passes was entirely at the discretion of the landowner, their prices were often incredibly high: up to 300 Danish rigsdaler. This was the equivalent of more than 10 times the annual salary for even the highest paid workers under the stavnsbånd.

The stavnsbånd only applied to men in Denmark proper, not in the rest of Denmark-Norway. Norway had its own system of serfdom, while a somewhat similar institution, the vistarband, existed in Iceland (also part of the Danish-Norwegian realm) from 1490 to 1894. Slavery was the backbone of the Danish West Indies until 1848, and its legal practices and enforcement were completely separate to the stavnsbånd.

== Life during the stavnsbånd ==
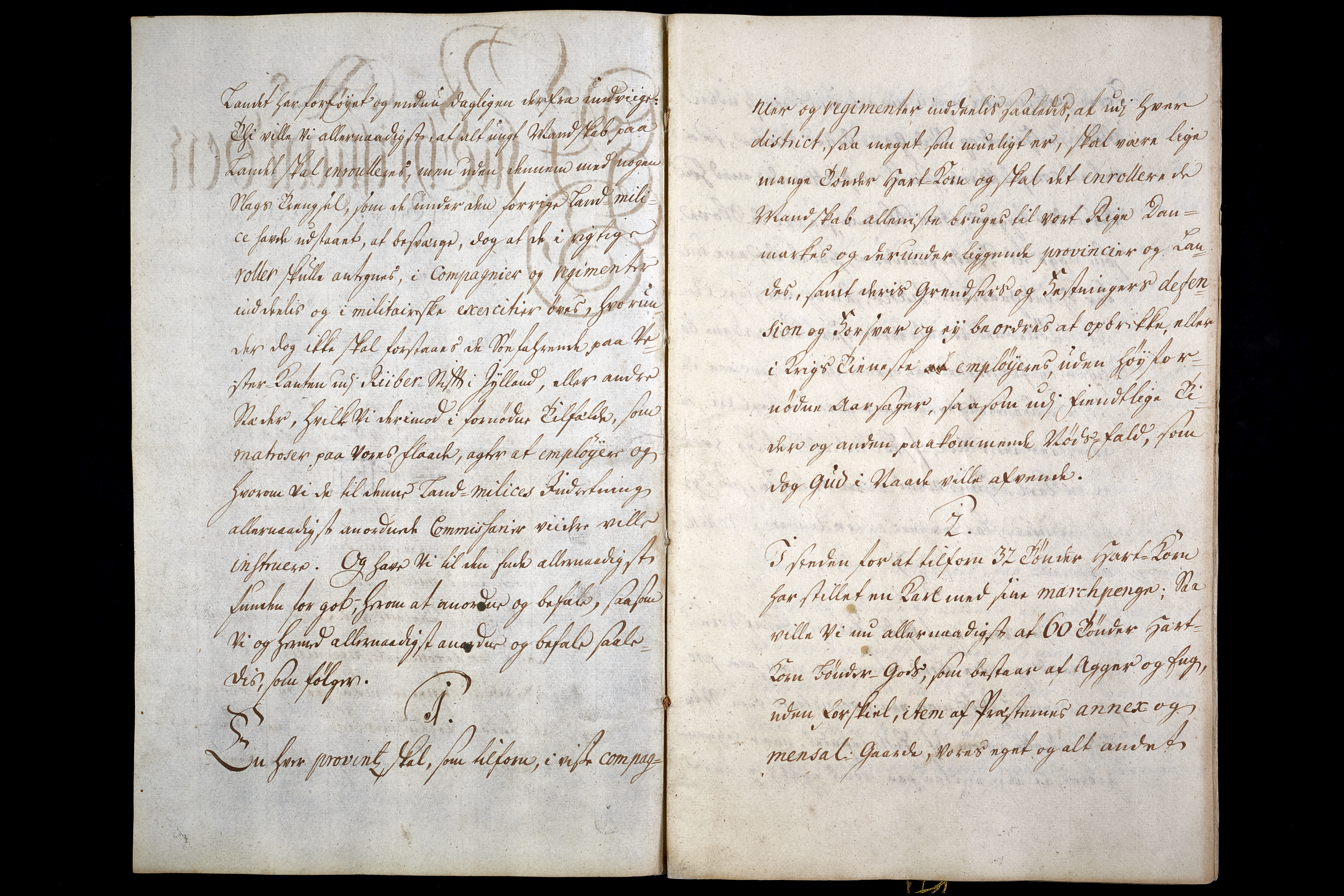
The 1733 document which brought the stavnsbånd into law.

For those living on estates under the stavnsbånd, life differed greatly between tenant farmers and peasants. Tenant farmers were generally respected within their village while often at the mercy of the landowner if they were unable to meet their quotas. By contrast, peasants bore less of the risk of turbulent agricultural yields, but had far less agency and worked at the whim of the landowner.

Young children, regardless of gender, typically began working around the age of 8. In 1739, compulsory education was introduced which required that children learn to read for the sake of confirmation. In the late 18th century it became increasingly common for children to attend school from that ages of 9–10, then again briefly to refresh their knowledge before being confirmed around the age of 16–17. Boys were listed by the estate from the age of 9, and from 1764 at the age of 4. This list was used by landowners to keep track of which potential laborers were attached to their estate. Some families attempted to circumvent the stavnsbånd system by sending their children to be raised by family in market towns until they surpassed this age.

Under the stansbånd, laborers were paid but they had no opportunity to negotiate their wages or seek work elsewhere. Wages varied greatly by region, with adult laborers receiving up to 28 Danish rigsdaler on Zealand and Funen, while adults in North and West Jutland could expect just 9–18 rigsdaler. Across the country, women typically earned about half of what their male counterparts received. Wages were often paid in kind, with laborers receiving wool, wooden shoes, and other materials in lieu of currency.

Many men attempted to escape and ran away from their estates. In practice, this was easier for those who lived closer to market towns with employment opportunities. Those who lived in areas with close trade connections with other regions, namely the Duchies of Schleswig and Holstein, also escaped bondage by leaving Denmark proper entirely. For those who left an estate, the landowner retained the right to forcibly return them.

For those who aged out of the stavnsbånd (men who made it to the age of 40 after 1742), they gained the right to terminate their employment and relocate. Tenant farmers in their old age often turned over their tenancy to their son or son-in-law who in turn cared for them, however this too was at the discretion of the landowner.

== Abolition ==
The economy changed dramatically between 1733, when the stavnsbånd was introduced, and the 1770s. By the 1770s, the prices of agricultural products were rising, the supply of agricultural laborers was in surplus, and there were plenty of men to supply the militia. In short, the labor economic issues which the stavnsbånd was responding to were no longer an issue. Yet, landowners continued to campaign for the expansion of the stavnsbånd's role, not because they needed more laborers, but because it had become a useful tool to keep wages low. Amid calls for labor and agricultural reform, landowners maintained that the stavnsbånd needed to be preserved so that labor costs could be kept artificially low.

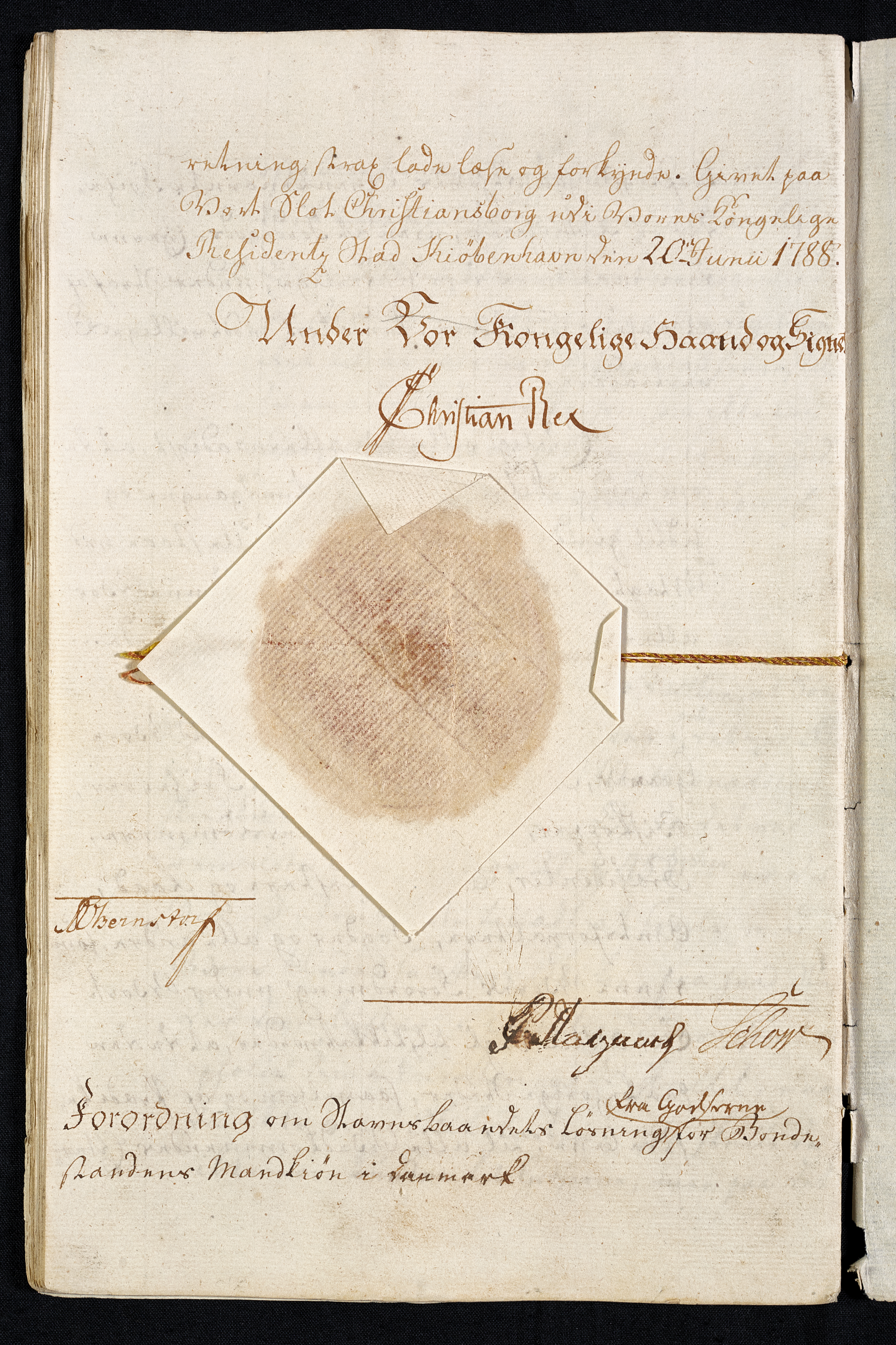
The stavnsbånd was abolished on 20 June 1788. The picture shows the last page of the abolition document with King Christian VII's signature, from the National Archives of Denmark.

Calls for reform increased in the late 18th century, in part due to the influence of new ideas brought from the Enlightenment surrounding equality and freedom. The stavnsbånd was increasingly viewed as a symbol of the harsh conditions forced upon the peasantry in Denmark. Many of those who campaigned in favor of abolishing the stavnsbånd believed that by allowing laborers to move freely, a market economy would develop which would force landowners to improve working conditions in order to attract laborers.

The Great Land Commission (Danish: Den store landbokommission) was established in 1786 immediately following Crown Prince Frederik's formal assumption of absolute power. The Commission was charged with drafting the terms of abolition of the stavnsbånd and with reforming agricultural practices in Denmark. The stavnsbånd was gradually abolished starting on 20 June 1788. At first, the reform affected only those under the age of 14. Thereafter, it affected those who were over the age of 36, and then those who had served in the military.

The time period in which the stavnsbånd was in force saw an overall strengthening of the power landowners had over the tenants of their estates. Its abolition, although gradual, was a symbolic shift away from the power of these older estates and towards agricultural reforms. The autocracy in Denmark was so well-developed at this time that the Danish state had become less dependent on estate owners as local administrators. As a result of the abolition of the stavnsbånd, military conscription was no longer to fall under the purview of landowners and was instead to be overseen by the county governor (Danish: amtmanden). By 1848, the complete introduction of military conscription meant the final transformation of the stavnsbånd, since men could now legally reside in any district they chose.

== See also ==
- Liberty Column, a monument in Copenhagen commemorating the end of Stavnsbånd.
- Vornedskab, the preceding form of serfdom in Denmark.
- Danish slave trade
