= Vistarband =

Icelandic requirement for agricultural labor

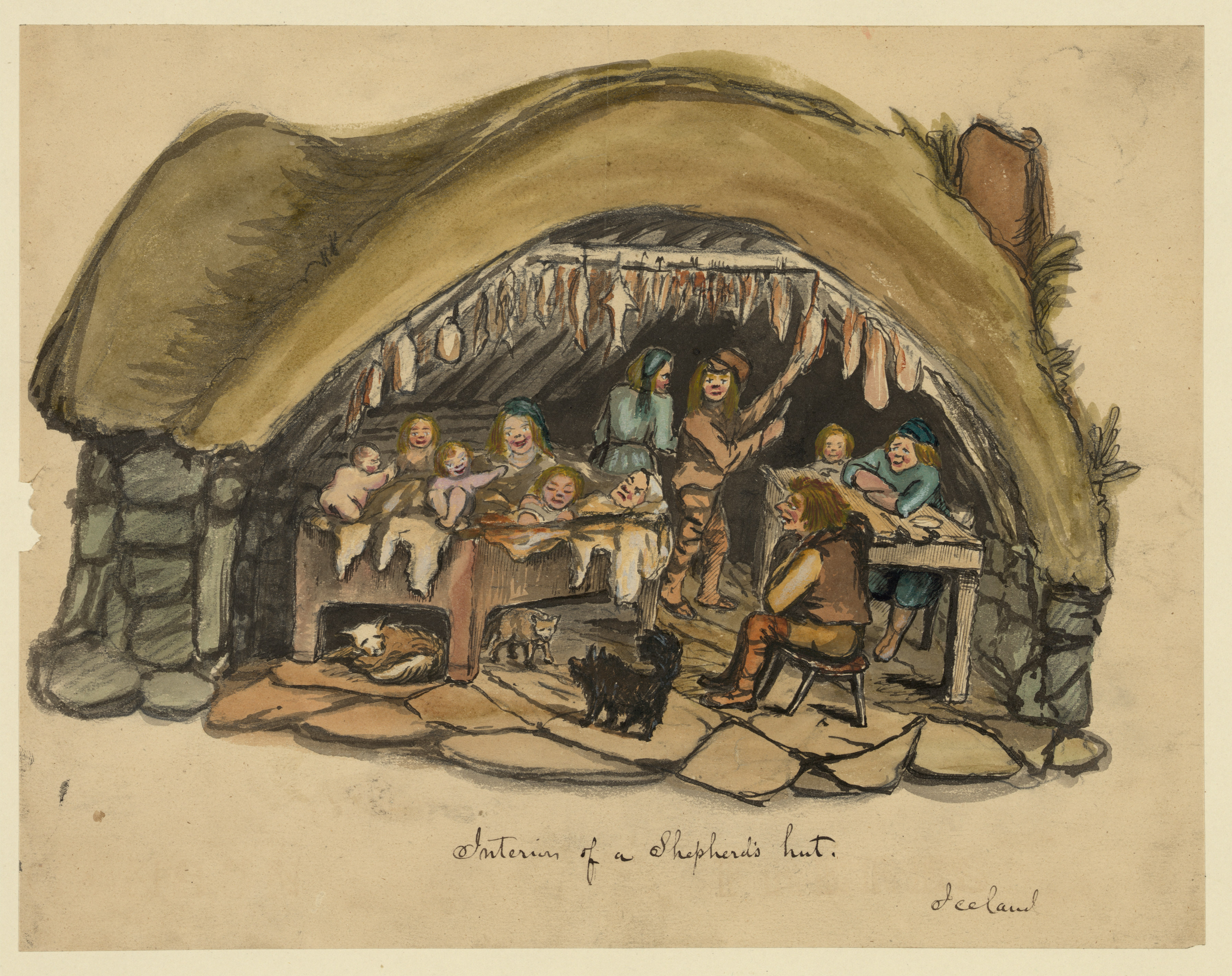
Interior of a shepherd's hut, Iceland, 1862 painting by Bayard Taylor

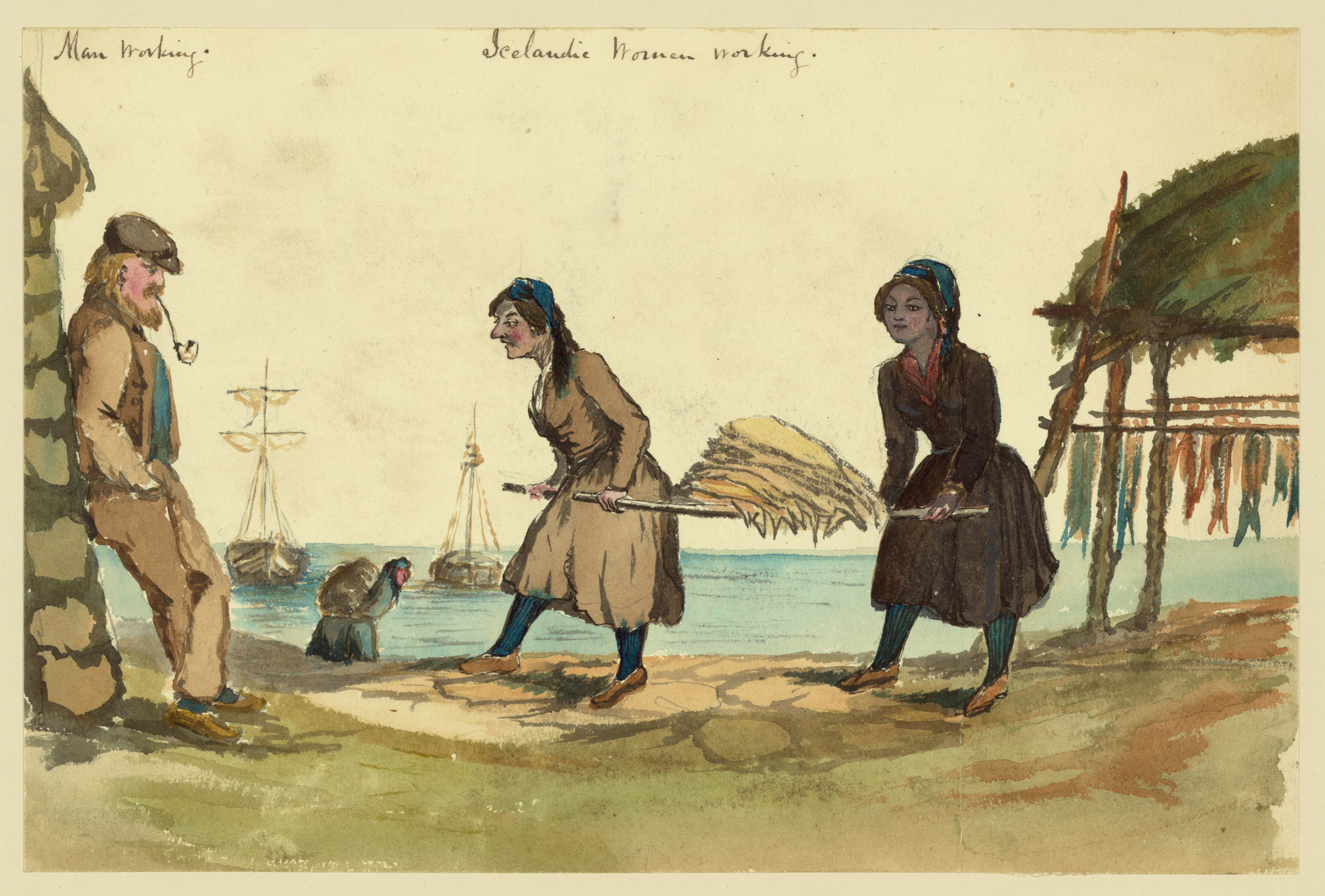
Women working in Iceland (Bayard Taylor, 1862)

The Icelandic vistarband (Icelandic pronunciation: [ˈvɪstarˌpant]) was a form of serfdom established during the Denmark–Norway domination of the island that required that all landless people be employed on a farm. A person who did not own or lease property had to find a position as a laborer (vinnuhjú [ˈvɪnnʏˌçuː]) in the home of a farmer. The custom was for landless people to contract themselves to a farmer for one year at a time. The vistarband was in effect from 1490 until the beginning of the 20th century, in various forms. Iceland had an unusually large percentage of the population in this kind of bondage—generally about 25% of the population during the 19th century.

The institution only applied in Iceland, not in the rest of Denmark–Norway. Norway had its own system of serfdom, while a somewhat similar institution, the stavnsbånd, existed in Denmark proper.

== Minimum farm size ==
The minimum farm size in Iceland, according to the Píningsdómur of 1490, was equal to the value of three cows. An individual who did not control property of at least this value had to become a farm laborer.

== Life of a laborer ==
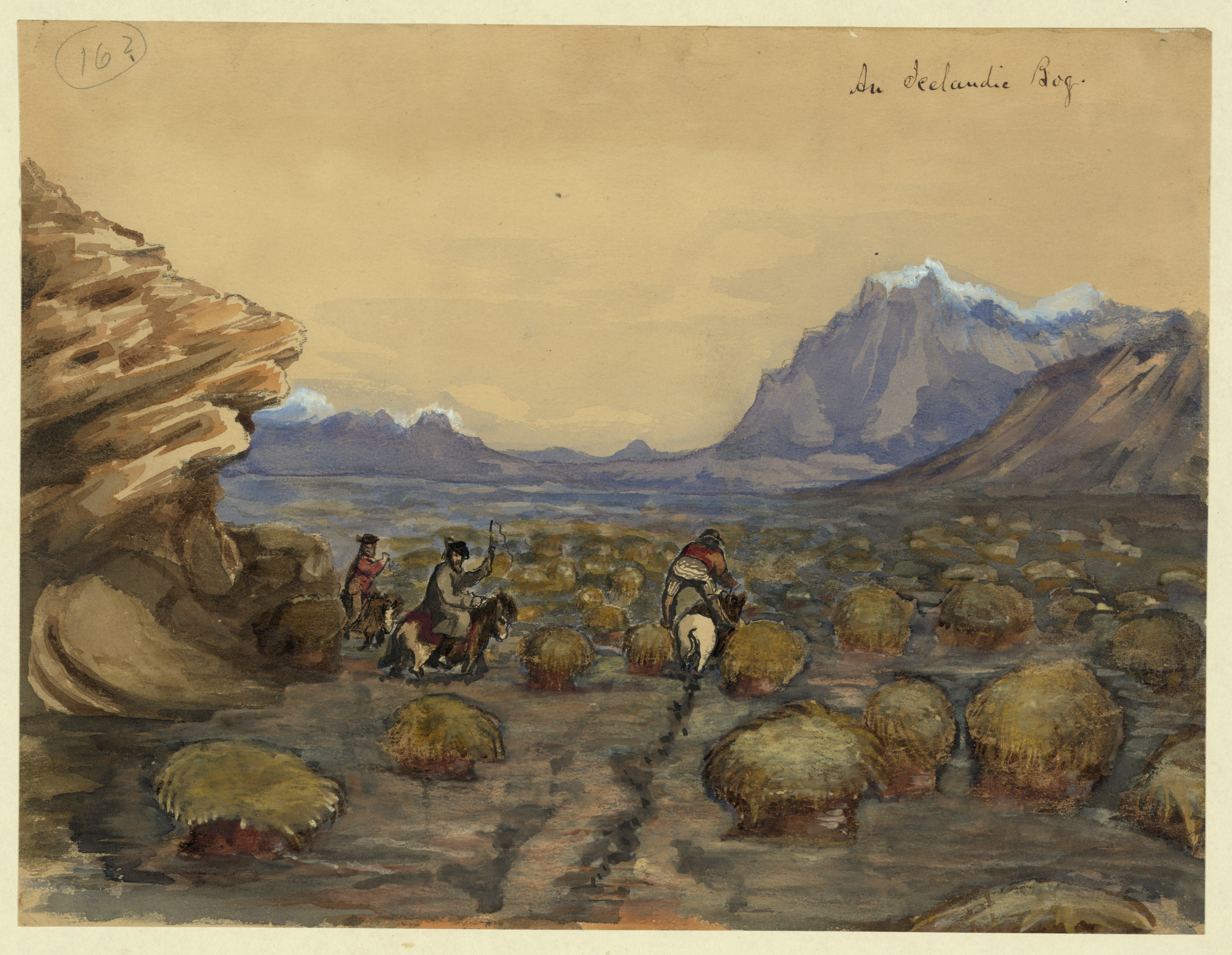
Workers on a bog in Iceland (Bayard Taylor, 1862)

It was common for Icelanders to work as farm laborers when they were young, and then, if they were able to rent land, to start their own farm and marry. But lifelong servitude was the fate of many, especially women. Most Icelandic farms were leased, and farmers were not required to reside there for more than one year at a time. The same applied to the vistarband; no laborer was required to stay with the same farmer for more than one year at a time. Thus while the vistarband was similar in some ways to serfdom, it differed in that those subject to it were at least technically able to leave the land where they worked.

If a farmer did not fulfill his responsibilities to a laborer, the laborer could appeal to the local district head (hreppstjóri [ˈr̥ɛhpˌstjouːrɪ]), but a laborer could not leave the farm without the farmer's permission.

== Free workers ==
It was sometimes possible to escape the vistarband by becoming a free worker (lausamaður [ˈlœyːsaˌmaːðʏr̥]). Free workers could sell their labor to employers on their own terms. Until 1783 property of the value of at least ten cows was required to become a free worker. Becoming a free worker was banned from 1783 to 1863. When it was permitted again after 1863 it was only under strictly limited conditions. After the growth of small-scale fishing in Iceland in the late 19th century the laws were changed in 1894, and free worker status became accessible for most landless Icelanders.

Liberal democratic governments in Denmark pushed Iceland to adopt freedom of occupation during the 19th century. However, Icelandic elites and parliamentarians resisted implementing freedom of occupation, saying that the vistarband arrangement benefitted both laborers and employers. Icelandic historian Guðmundur Hálfdanarson argues that liberal democratic reforms during the 19th century in the Danish kingdom motivated Icelandic elites, who perceived these liberal democratic reforms as threats to their power and status, to push for greater Icelandic autonomy within the Danish kingdom.
