= Slavery =

Ownership of people as property

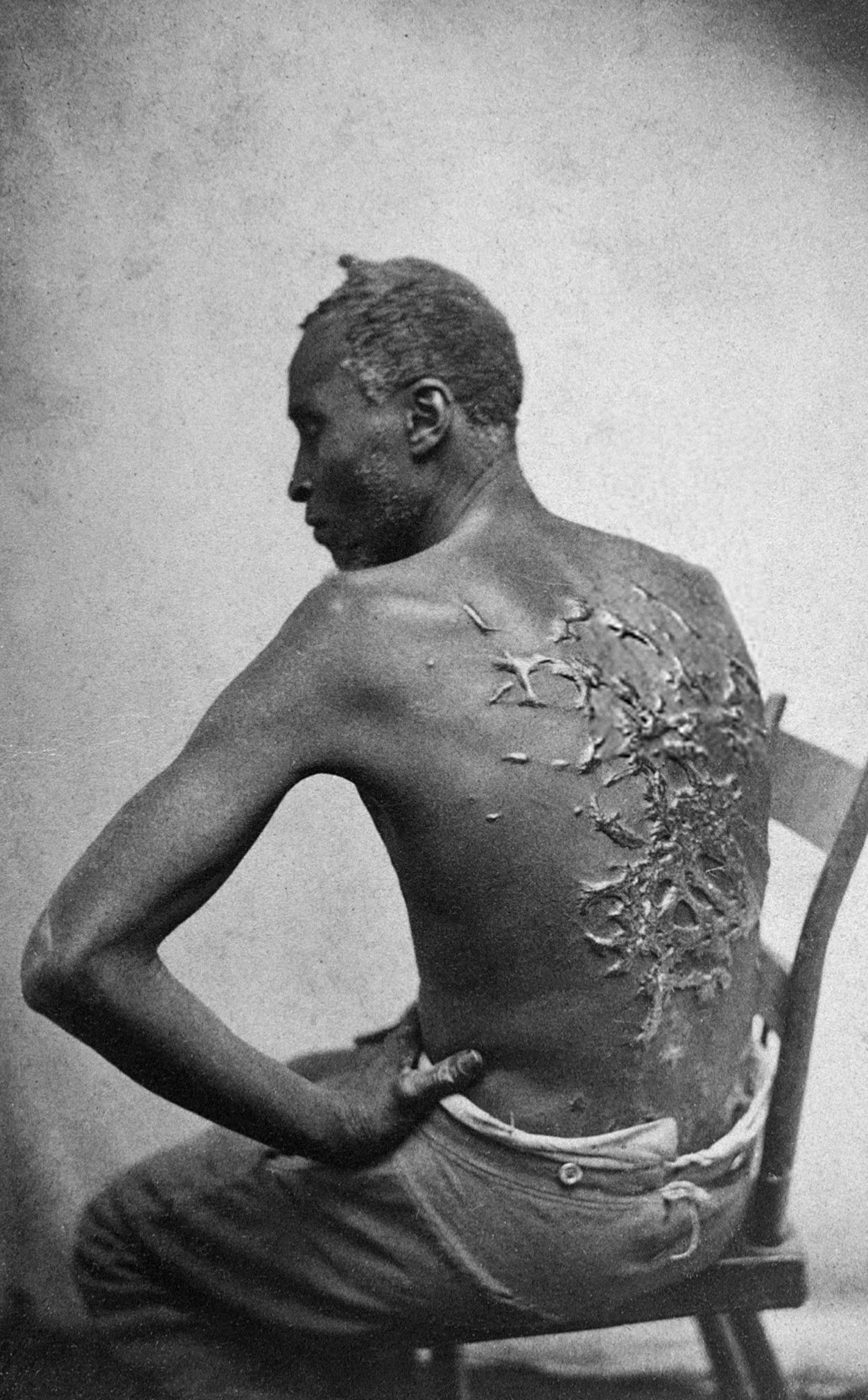
Peter, a slave from Louisiana, in 1863. The scars are the result of a whipping by his overseer.

Slavery is the ownership of a person as property, especially in regard to their labour. It is an economic phenomenon and its history resides in economic history. Slavery typically involves compulsory work, with the slave's location of work and residence dictated by the party that holds them in bondage. Enslavement is the placement of a person into slavery, and the person is called a slave or an enslaved person.

Many historical cases of enslavement occurred as a result of breaking the law, becoming indebted, suffering a military defeat, or exploitation for cheaper labor; other forms of slavery were instituted along demographic lines such as race or sex. Slaves would be kept in bondage for life, or for a fixed period of time after which they would be granted freedom. Although slavery is usually involuntary and involves coercion, there are also cases where people voluntarily enter into slavery to pay a debt or earn money due to poverty. In the course of human history, slavery was a common feature of civilization, and existed in most societies throughout history, but it is now outlawed in every country in the world except as a punishment for a crime. In general there were two types of slavery throughout human history: domestic and productive.

In chattel slavery, the slave is legally rendered the personal property (chattel) of the slave owner. In economics, the term de facto slavery describes the conditions of unfree labour and forced labour that most slaves endure. Slavery, despite no longer being legally recognized anywhere in the world, is still prevalent in some form in all countries today. By global region, its prevalence is roughly proportional to the overall population: 60% of the world's enslaved population is in Asia and the Pacific, 23% in Africa, 9% in Europe and Central Asia, 5% in the Americas, and 1% in Arab states. In 2019, approximately 40 million people, of whom 26% were children, were still enslaved throughout the world despite slavery being illegal. In the modern world, more than 50% of slaves provide forced labour, usually in the factories and sweatshops of the private sector of a country's economy. In industrialised countries, human trafficking is a modern variety of slavery; in non-industrialised countries, people in debt bondage are common, others include captive domestic servants, people in forced marriages, and child soldiers.

== Etymology ==
The word slave was borrowed into Middle English through the Old French esclave which ultimately derives from Byzantine Greek σκλάβος (sklábos) or ἐσκλαβῆνος (esklabḗnos).

According to the widespread view, which has been known since the 18th century, the Byzantine Σκλάβινοι (Sklábinoi), Ἐσκλαβηνοί (Esklabēnoí), borrowed from a Slavic tribe self-name *Slověne, turned into σκλάβος, ἐσκλαβῆνος (Late Latin sclāvus) in the meaning 'prisoner of war slave', 'slave' in the 8th/9th century, because they often became captured and enslaved.

An alternative contemporary hypothesis suggests that Medieval Latin sclāvus via *scylāvus derives from Byzantine σκυλάω (skūláō, skyláō) or σκυλεύω (skūleúō, skyleúō) with the meaning "to strip the enemy (killed in a battle)" or "to make booty / extract spoils of war". This version has been criticized.

== Terminology ==
There is no consensus among historians about whether terms such as "unfree labourer" or "enslaved person", rather than "slave", should be used when describing the victims of slavery. According to those proposing a change in terminology, slave perpetuates the crime of slavery in language by reducing its victims to a nonhuman noun instead of "carry[ing] them forward as people, not the property that they were" (see also People-first language). Other historians prefer slave because the term is familiar and shorter, or because it accurately reflects the inhumanity of slavery, with person implying a degree of autonomy that slavery does not allow.

=== Chattel slavery ===
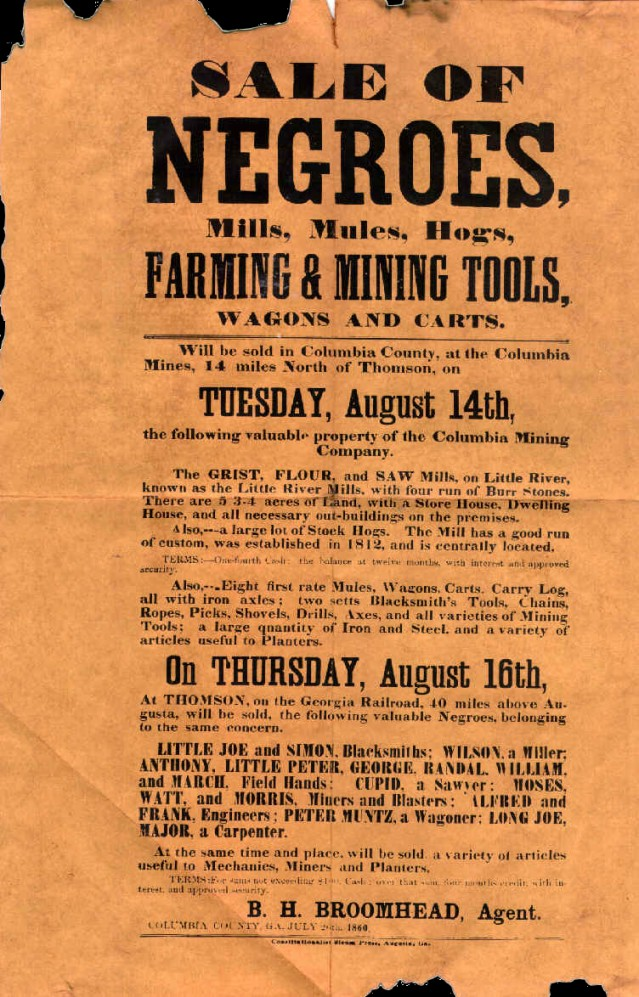
A poster for a slave auction in Georgia, U.S., 1860

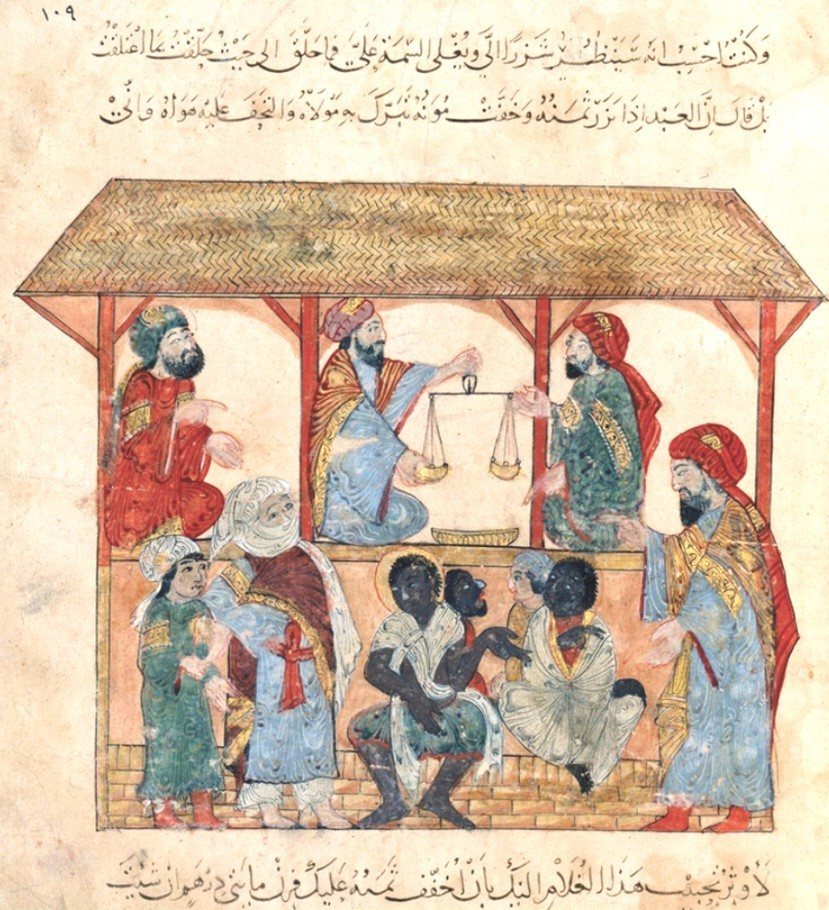
13th-century slave market in Yemen

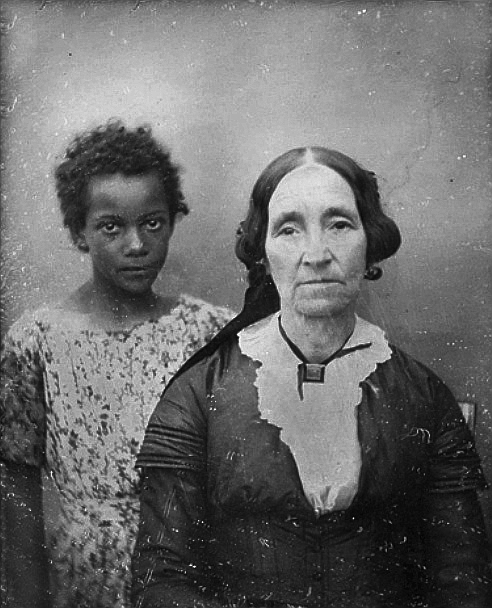
Photo of older woman in New Orleans with her enslaved servant girl in the mid-19th century

As a social institution, chattel slavery classes slaves as chattels (personal property) owned by the enslaver; like livestock, they can be bought and sold at will. Chattel slavery was historically a widely accepted form of slavery in many parts of the world, and was practiced in places such as ancient Greece and the Roman Empire, where it was considered a keystone of society. Other examples include the institution of slavery in the Muslim world such as Medieval Egypt, as well as Sub-Saharan Africa, Brazil, the Antebellum South of the United States, and parts of the Caribbean such as Cuba and Haiti. The Haudenosaunee and other Iroquoian peoples also had practices similar to chattel slavery; the key difference was that captives were held for the stated purpose of "assimilating them into Iroquoian culture". As a result, there were several ways to escape captivity, and the children of those in bondage "became fully part of society".

Beginning in the 18th century, a series of abolitionist movements in Europe and the Americas saw slavery as a violation of the slaves' rights as people ("all men are created equal"), and sought to abolish it. Abolitionism encountered extreme resistance but was eventually successful. Several of the states of the United States began abolishing slavery during the American Revolutionary War. After the French Revolution, the government of France abolished slavery in 1794, but Napoleon reintroduced it in 1802 and permanent abolition did not occur until 1848. In much of the British Empire, slavery was subject to abolition in 1833, throughout the United States it was abolished in 1865 as a result of the Civil War, which was fought after the attempted secession of the South in order to protect its "Peculiar Institution" (i.e. slavery). In Cuba slavery was abolished in 1886. The last country in the Americas to abolish slavery was Brazil, in 1888.

Chattel slavery survived longest in the Middle East. After the trans-Atlantic slave trade had been suppressed, the ancient trans-Saharan slave trade, the Indian Ocean slave trade and the Red Sea slave trade continued to traffic slaves from the African continent to the Middle East.

During the 20th century, the issue of chattel slavery was addressed and investigated globally by international bodies created by the League of Nations and the United Nations (UN), such as the Temporary Slavery Commission in 1924–1926, the Committee of Experts on Slavery in 1932, and the Advisory Committee of Experts on Slavery in 1934–1939. By the time of the UN Ad Hoc Committee on Slavery in 1950–1951, legal chattel slavery still existed only in the Arabian Peninsula: in Oman, in Qatar, in Saudi Arabia, in the Trucial States and in Yemen. Legal chattel slavery was finally abolished in the Arabian Peninsula in the 1960s: Saudi Arabia and Yemen in 1962, in Dubai in 1963, and Oman as the last in 1970.

The last country to abolish slavery, Mauritania, did so in 1981. While slavery had technically been banned by colonial France in French West Africa (including Mauritania) already in 1905, this had been a purely nominal ban. The 1981 ban on slavery was not enforced in practice, as legal mechanisms to prosecute those who used slaves were not implemented until 2007.

=== Bonded labour ===
Indenture, also known as bonded labour or debt bondage, is a form of unfree labour in which a person works to pay off a debt by pledging themself as collateral. The services required to repay the debt, and their duration, may be undefined. Debt bondage can be passed on from generation to generation, with children required to pay off their progenitors' debt. Debt bondage is most prevalent in South Asia, and is the most widespread form of slavery today.

Money marriage refers to a marriage where a child, usually a girl, is married off to settle debts owed by their parents. The Chukri system is a debt bondage system found in parts of Bengal where a woman or girl can be coerced into prostitution in order to pay off debts.

=== Dependents ===
The word slavery has also been used to refer to a legal state of dependency to somebody else. For example, in Persia, the situations and lives of such slaves could be better than those of common citizens.

=== Forced labour ===
Forced labour, or unfree labour, is sometimes used to describe an individual who is forced to work against their own will, under threat of violence or other punishment. This includes institutions not commonly classified as slavery, such as serfdom, conscription and penal labour. As slavery has been legally outlawed in all countries, forced labour in the present day (frequently referred to as "modern slavery") revolves around illegal control.

Human trafficking primarily involves women and children forced into prostitution and is the fastest growing form of forced labour, with Thailand, Cambodia, India, Brazil and Mexico having been identified as leading hotspots of commercial sexual exploitation of children.

==== Child soldiers and child labour ====
In 2007, Human Rights Watch estimated that 200,000 to 300,000 children served as soldiers in then-current conflicts. More girls under 16 work as domestic workers than any other category of child labour, often sent to cities by parents living in rural poverty as with the Haitian restaveks.

=== Forced marriage ===
Forced marriages or early marriages are often considered types of slavery. Forced marriage continues to be practiced in parts of the world including some parts of Asia and Africa and in immigrant communities in the West. Marriage by abduction occurs in many places in the world today, with a 2003 study finding a national average of 69% of marriages in Ethiopia being through abduction.

=== Other uses of the term ===
The word slavery is often used to describe any activity in which one is coerced into performing. Military drafts and other forms of coerced government labour constitute "state-operated slavery." Some libertarians and anarcho-capitalists view government taxation as a form of slavery.

"Slavery" has been used by some anti-psychiatry proponents to define involuntary psychiatric patients, claiming there are no unbiased physical tests for mental illness and yet the psychiatric patient must follow the orders of the psychiatrist. They assert that instead of chains to control the slave, the psychiatrist uses drugs to control the mind. Drapetomania was a pseudoscientific psychiatric diagnosis for a slave who desired freedom; "symptoms" included laziness and the tendency to flee captivity.

Some proponents of animal rights have applied the term slavery to the condition of some or all human-owned animals, arguing that their status is comparable to that of human slaves.

The labour market, as institutionalized under contemporary capitalist systems, has been criticized by mainstream socialists and by anarcho-syndicalists, who utilise the term wage slavery as a pejorative or dysphemism for wage labour. Socialists draw parallels between the trade of labour as a commodity and slavery. Cicero is also known to have suggested such parallels.

== Characteristics ==
=== Economics ===
Economists have modeled the circumstances under which slavery (and variants such as serfdom) appear and disappear. One theoretical model is that slavery becomes more desirable for landowners where land is abundant, but labour is scarce, such that rent is depressed and paid workers can demand high wages. If the opposite holds true, then it is more costly for landowners to guard the slaves than to employ paid workers who can demand only low wages because of the degree of competition. Thus, first slavery and then serfdom gradually decreased in Europe as the population grew. They were reintroduced in the Americas and in Russia as large areas of land with few inhabitants became available.

Slavery is more common when the tasks are relatively simple and thus easy to supervise, such as large-scale monocrops such as sugarcane and cotton, in which output depended on economies of scale. This enables systems of labour, such as the gang system in the United States, to become prominent on large plantations where field hands toiled with factory-like precision. Then, each work gang was based on an internal division of labour that assigned every member of the gang to a task and made each worker's performance dependent on the actions of the others. The slaves chopped out the weeds that surrounded the cotton plants as well as excess sprouts. Plow gangs followed behind, stirring the soil near the plants and tossing it back around the plants. Thus, the gang system worked like an assembly line.

Since the 18th century, critics have argued that slavery hinders technological advancement because the focus is on increasing the number of slaves doing simple tasks rather than upgrading their efficiency. For example, it is sometimes argued that, because of this narrow focus, technology in Greece – and later in Rome – was not applied to ease physical labour or improve manufacturing.

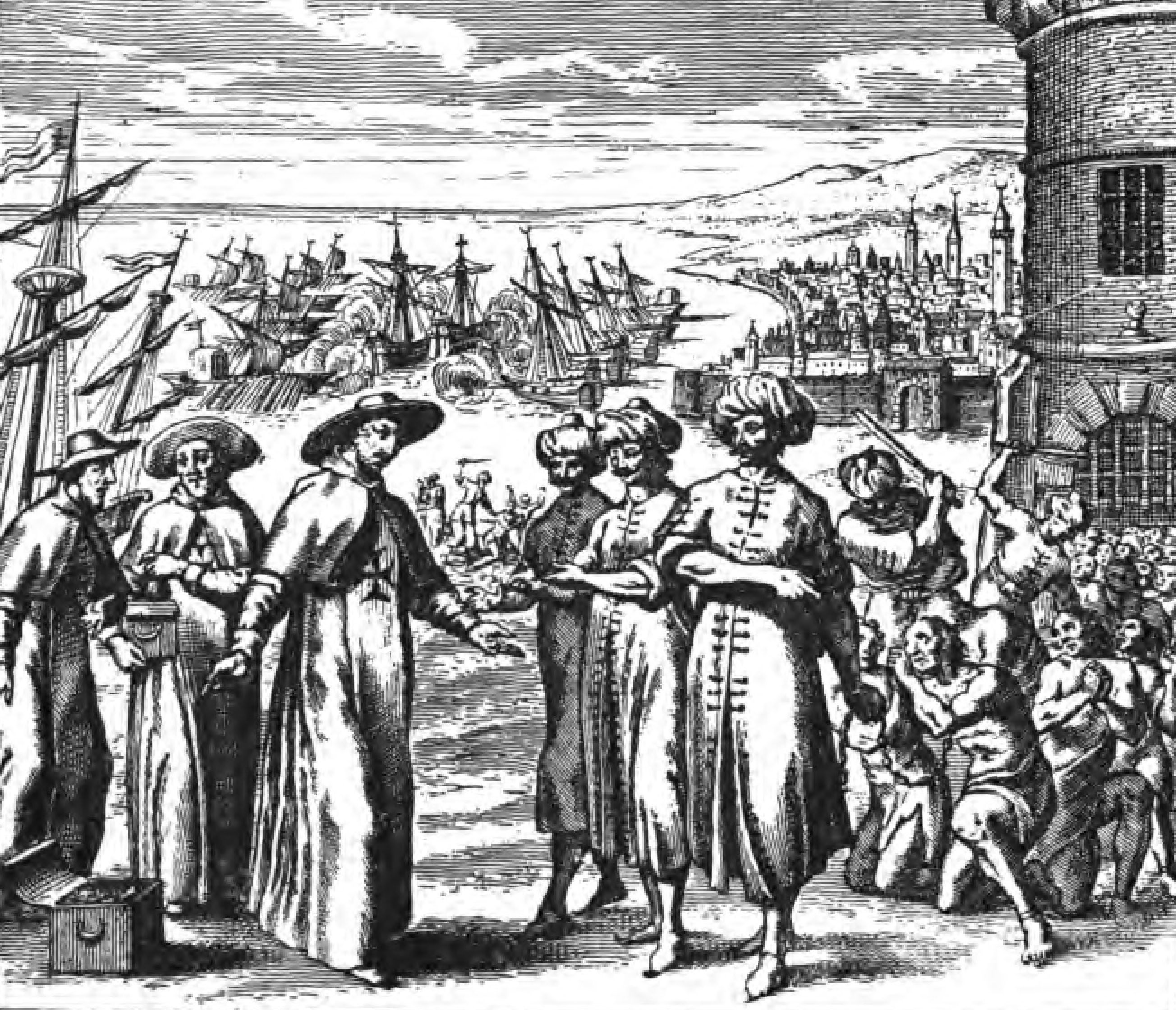
The work of the Mercedarians was in ransoming Christian slaves held in North Africa (1637).

Scottish economist Adam Smith stated that free labour was economically better than slave labour, and that it was nearly impossible to end slavery in a free, democratic, or republican form of government since many of its legislators or political figures were slave owners and would not punish themselves. He further stated that slaves would be better able to gain their freedom under centralized government, or a central authority like a king or church. Similar arguments appeared later in the works of Auguste Comte, especially given Smith's belief in the separation of powers, or what Comte called the "separation of the spiritual and the temporal" during the Middle Ages and the end of slavery, and Smith's criticism of masters, past and present. As Smith stated in the Lectures on Jurisprudence, "The great power of the clergy thus concurring with that of the king set the slaves at liberty. But it was absolutely necessary both that the authority of the king and of the clergy should be great. Where ever any one of these was wanting, slavery still continues..."

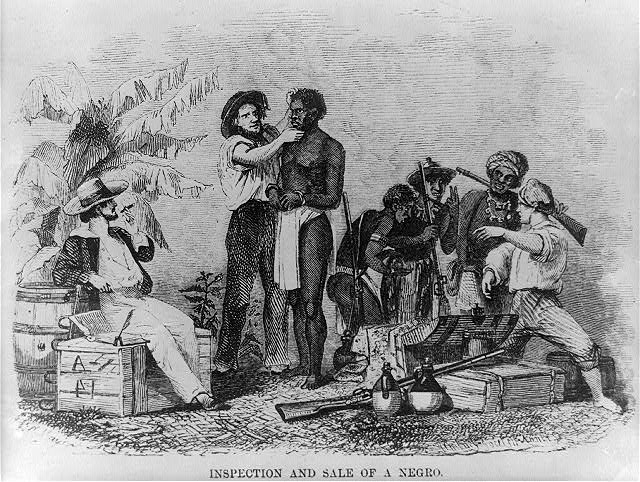
Sale and inspection of slaves

Even after slavery became a criminal offense, slave owners could get high returns. According to researcher Siddharth Kara, the profits generated worldwide by all forms of slavery in 2007 were $91.2 billion. That was second only to drug trafficking, in terms of global criminal enterprises. At the time the weighted average global sales price of a slave was estimated to be approximately $340, with a high of $1,895 for the average trafficked sex slave, and a low of $40 to $50 for debt bondage slaves in part of Asia and Africa. The weighted average annual profits generated by a slave in 2007 was $3,175, with a low of an average $950 for bonded labour and $29,210 for a trafficked sex slave. Approximately 40% of slave profits each year were generated by trafficked sex slaves, representing slightly more than 4% of the world's 29 million slaves.

=== Identification ===
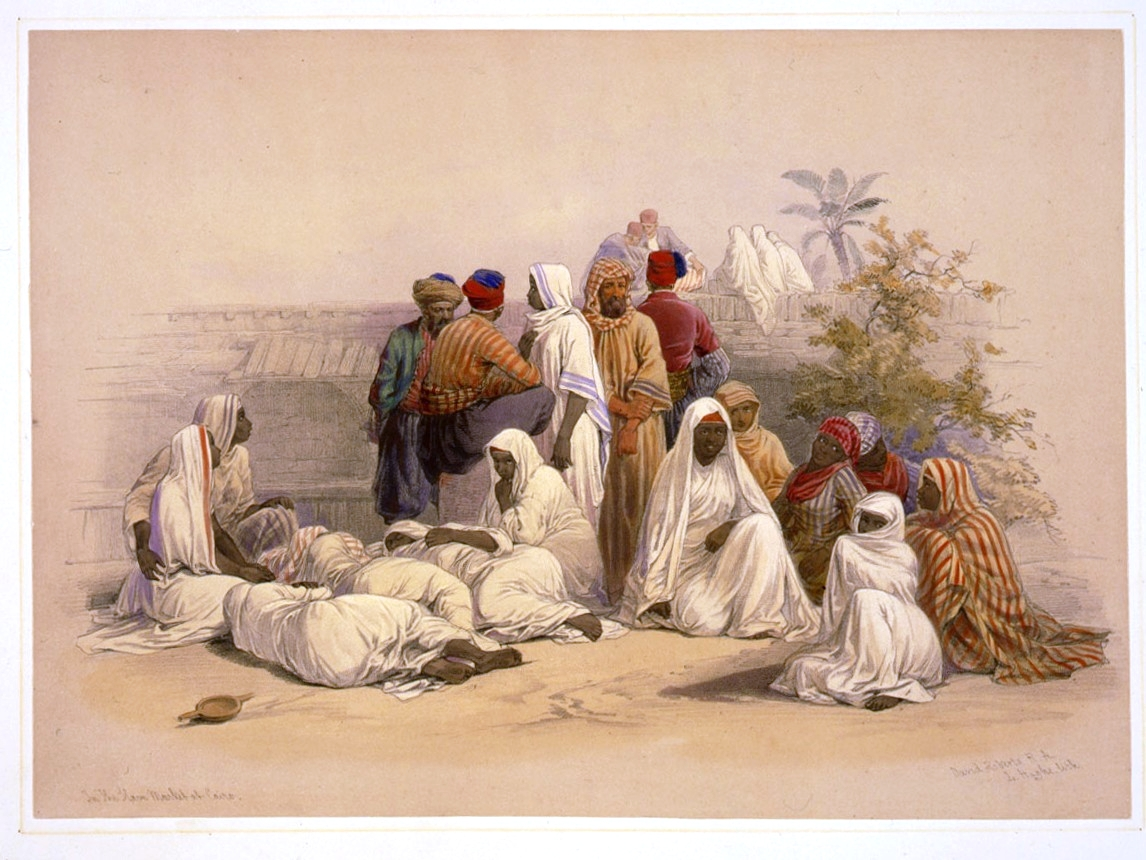
Barefooted slaves depicted in David Roberts' Egypt and Nubia, issued between 1845 and 1849, depicting victims of the slavery in Egypt.

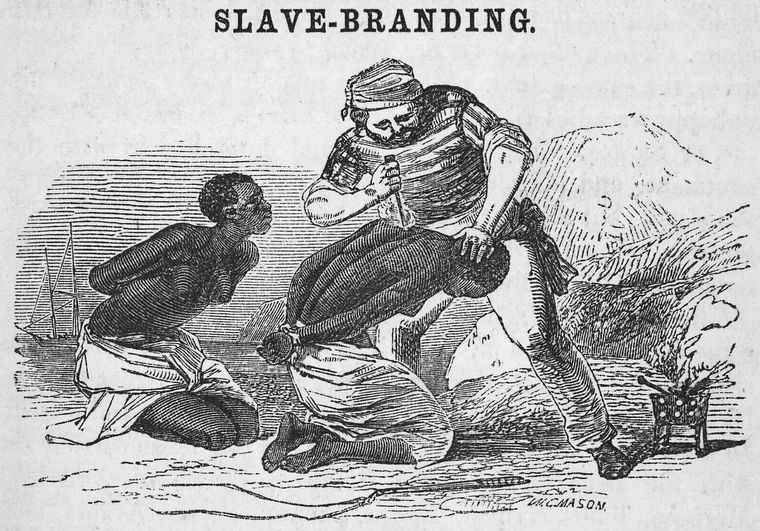
Slave branding, c. 1853

Slaves are often identified or marked via mutilation or tattooing. A widespread practice was branding, either to explicitly mark slaves as property or as punishment. Some slaves are forced to wear shackles that cannot be removed such as cuffs, legcuffs, collars, chains, or anklets.

== Legal aspects ==
=== Private versus state-owned slaves ===
Slaves have been owned privately by individuals but have also been under state ownership. For example, the kisaeng were women from low castes in pre modern Korea, who were owned by the state under government officials known as hojang and were required to provide entertainment to the aristocracy. In the 2020s, in North Korea, Kippumjo ("Pleasure Brigades") are made up of women selected from the general population to serve as entertainers and as concubines to the rulers of North Korea. "Tribute labor" is compulsory labor for the state and has been used in various iterations such as corvée, mit'a and repartimiento. The internment camps of totalitarian regimes such as the Nazis and the Soviet Union placed increasing importance on the labor provided in those camps, leading to a growing tendency among historians to designate such systems as slavery.

A combination of these include the encomienda where the Spanish Crown granted private individuals the right to the free labour of a specified number of natives in a given area. In the "Red Rubber System" of both the Congo Free State and French ruled Ubangi-Shari, labour was demanded as taxation; private companies were conceded areas within which they were allowed to use any measures to increase rubber production. Convict leasing was common in the Southern United States where the state would lease prisoners for their free labour to companies.

=== Legal rights ===
Depending upon the era and the country, slaves sometimes had a limited set of legal rights. For example, in the Province of New York, people who deliberately killed slaves were punishable under a 1686 statute. And, as already mentioned, certain legal rights were attached to the nobi in Korea, to slaves in various African societies, and to black female slaves in the French colony of Louisiana. Giving slaves legal rights has sometimes been a matter of morality, but also sometimes a matter of self-interest. For example, in ancient Athens, protecting slaves from mistreatment simultaneously protected people who might be mistaken for slaves, and giving slaves limited property rights incentivized slaves to work harder to get more property.

== History ==
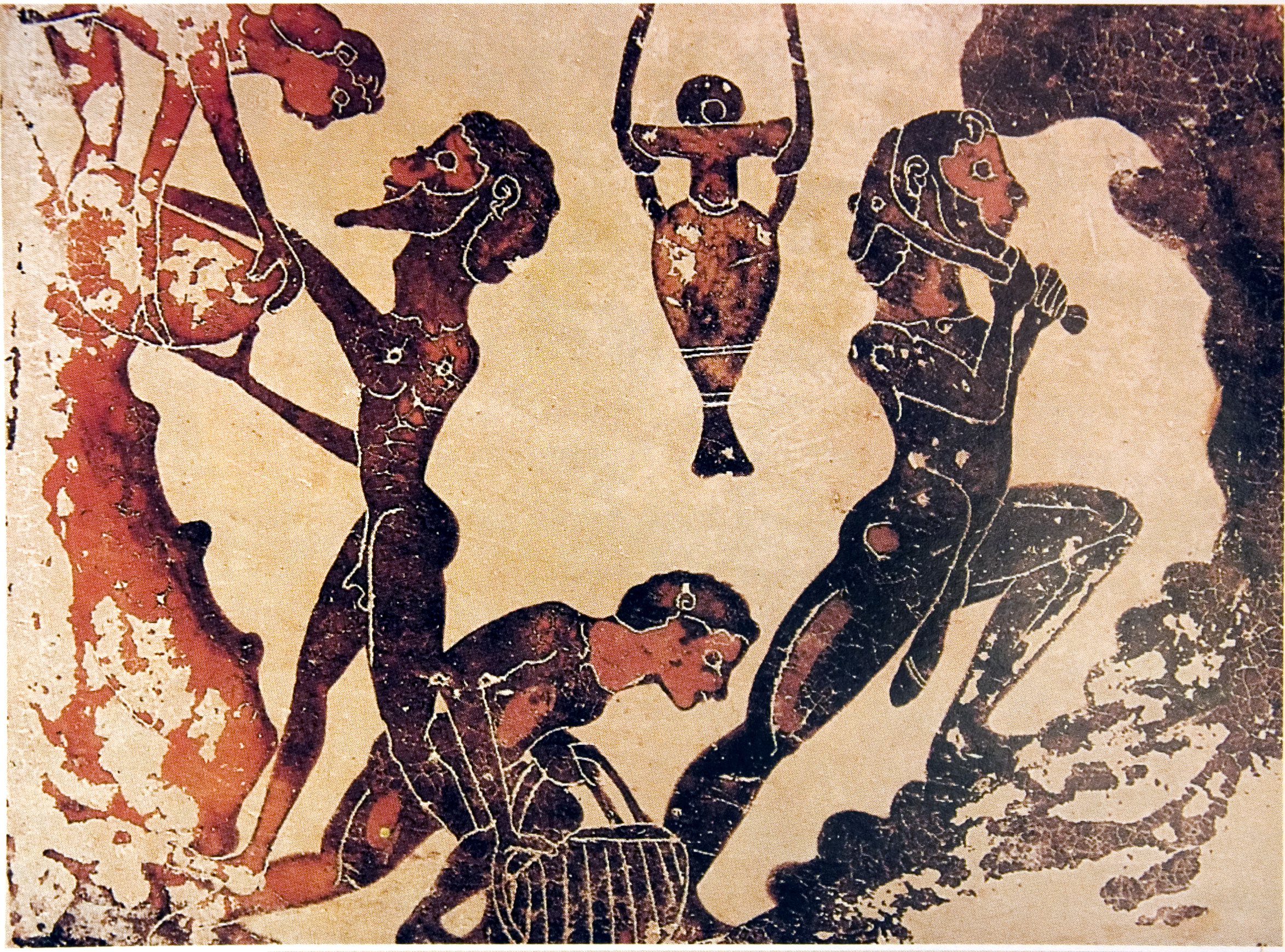
Corinthian black-figure terra-cotta votive tablet of slaves working in a mine, dated to the late seventh century BC

Slavery predates written records and has existed in many cultures. Slavery is rare among hunter-gatherer populations because it requires economic surpluses and a substantial population density. Thus, although it has existed among unusually resource-rich hunter gatherers, such as the American Indian peoples of the salmon-rich rivers of the Pacific Northwest coast, slavery became widespread only with the invention of agriculture during the Neolithic Revolution about 11,000 years ago. Slavery was practiced in almost every ancient civilization. Such institutions included debt bondage, punishment for crime, the enslavement of prisoners of war, child abandonment, and the enslavement of slaves' offspring.

=== Africa ===
Slavery was widespread in Africa, which pursued both internal and external slave trade. In the Senegambia region, between 1300 and 1900, close to one-third of the population was enslaved. In early Islamic states of the western Sahel, including Ghana, Mali, Segou, and Songhai, about a third of the population were enslaved.

In European courtly society, and European aristocracy, black African slaves and their children became visible in the late 1300s and 1400s. Starting with Frederick II, Holy Roman Emperor, black Africans were included in the retinue. In 1402 an Ethiopian embassy reached Venice. In the 1470s black Africans were painted as court attendants in wall paintings that were displayed in Mantua and Ferrara. In the 1490s black Africans were included on the emblem of the Duke of Milan.

During the trans-Saharan slave trade, slaves from West Africa were transported across the Sahara desert to North Africa to be sold to Mediterranean and Middle eastern civilizations. During the Red Sea slave trade, slaves were transported from Africa across the Red Sea to the Arabian Peninsula. The Indian Ocean slave trade, sometimes known as the east African slave trade, was multi-directional. Africans were sent as slaves to the Arabian Peninsula, to Indian Ocean islands (including Madagascar), to the Indian subcontinent, and later to the Americas. These traders captured Bantu peoples (Zanj) from the interior in present-day Kenya, Mozambique and Tanzania and brought them to the coast. There, the slaves gradually assimilated in rural areas, particularly on Unguja and Pemba islands.

Some historians assert that as many as 17 million people were sold into slavery on the coast of the Indian Ocean, the Middle East, and North Africa, and approximately 5 million African slaves were bought by Muslim slave traders and taken from Africa across the Red Sea, Indian Ocean, and Sahara Desert between 1500 and 1900. The captives were sold throughout the Middle East. This trade accelerated as superior ships led to more trade and greater demand for labour on plantations in the region. Eventually, tens of thousands of captives were being taken every year. The Indian Ocean slave trade was multi-directional and changed over time. To meet the demand for menial labour, Bantu slaves bought by east African slave traders from southeastern Africa were sold in cumulatively large numbers over the centuries to customers in Egypt, Arabia, the Persian Gulf, India, European colonies in the Far East, the Indian Ocean islands, Ethiopia, Sudan and Somalia.

According to the Encyclopedia of African History, "It is estimated that by the 1890s the largest slave population of the world, about 2 million people, was concentrated in the territories of the Sokoto Caliphate. The use of slave labour was extensive, especially in agriculture." The Anti-Slavery Society estimated there were 2 million slaves in Ethiopia in the early 1930s out of an estimated population of 8 to 16 million.

Slave labour in East Africa was drawn from the Zanj, Bantu peoples that lived along the East African coast. The Zanj were for centuries shipped as slaves by Arab traders to all the countries bordering the Indian Ocean during the Indian Ocean slave trade. The Umayyad and Abbasid caliphs recruited many Zanj slaves as soldiers and, as early as 696, there were slave revolts of the Zanj against their Arab enslavers during their slavery in the Umayyad Caliphate in Iraq. The Zanj Rebellion, a series of uprisings that took place between 869 and 883 near Basra (also known as Basara), against the slavery in the Abbasid Caliphate situated in present-day Iraq, is believed to have involved enslaved Zanj that had originally been captured from the African Great Lakes region and areas further south in East Africa. It grew to involve over 500,000 slaves and free men who were imported from across the Muslim empire and claimed over "tens of thousands of lives in lower Iraq".

The Zanj who were taken as slaves to the Middle East were often used in strenuous agricultural work. As the plantation economy boomed and the Arabs became richer, agriculture and other manual labour work was thought to be demeaning. The resulting labour shortage led to an increased slave market.

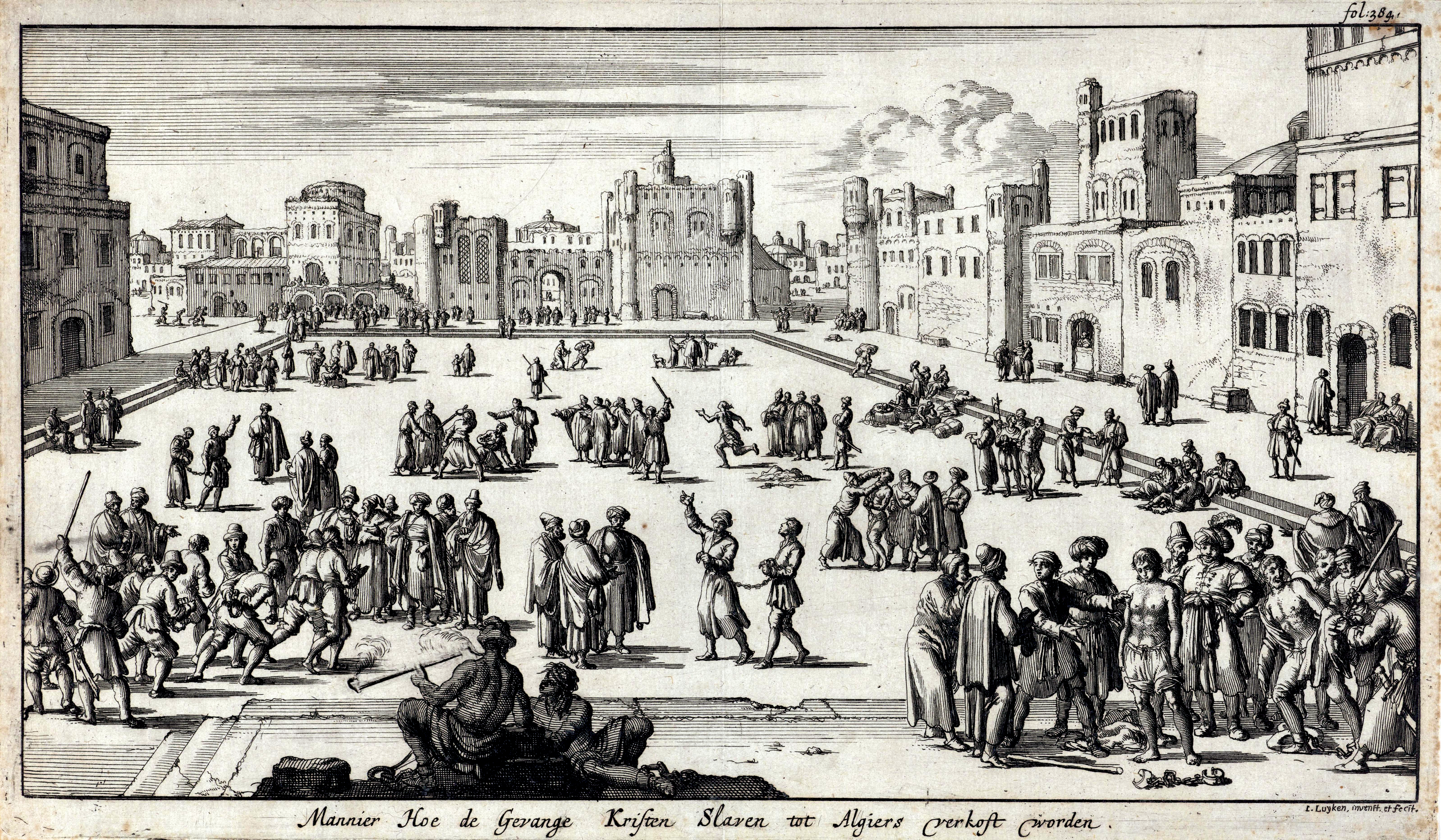
Slave market in Algiers, 1684

In Algiers, the capital of Algeria, captured Christians and Europeans were forced into slavery. In about 1650, there were as many as 35,000 Christian slaves in Algiers. By one estimate, raids by Barbary slave traders on coastal villages and ships extending from Italy to Iceland, enslaved an estimated 1 to 1.25 million Europeans between the 16th and 19th centuries. However, this estimate is the result of an extrapolation which assumes that the number of European slaves captured by Barbary pirates was constant for a 250-year period:

There are no records of how many men, women and children were enslaved, but it is possible to calculate roughly the number of fresh captives that would have been needed to keep populations steady and replace those slaves who died, escaped, were ransomed, or converted to Islam. On this basis it is thought that around 8,500 new slaves were needed annually to replenish numbers – about 850,000 captives over the century from 1580 to 1680. By extension, for the 250 years between 1530 and 1780, the figure could easily have been as high as 1,250,000.

Davis' numbers have been refuted by other historians, such as David Earle, who cautions that true picture of Europeans slaves is clouded by the fact the corsairs also seized non-Christian whites from eastern Europe. In addition, the number of slaves traded was hyperactive, with exaggerated estimates relying on peak years to calculate averages for entire centuries, or millennia. Hence, there were wide fluctuations year-to-year, particularly in the 18th and 19th centuries, given slave imports, and also given the fact that, prior to the 1840s, there are no consistent records. Middle East expert, John Wright, cautions that modern estimates are based on back-calculations from human observation. Such observations, across the late 16th and early 17th century observers, account for around 35,000 European Christian slaves held throughout this period on the Barbary Coast, across Tripoli, Tunis, but mostly in Algiers. The majority were sailors (particularly those who were English), taken with their ships, but others were fishermen and coastal villagers. However, most of these captives were people from lands close to Africa, particularly Spain and Italy. This eventually led to the bombardment of Algiers by an Anglo-Dutch fleet in 1816.

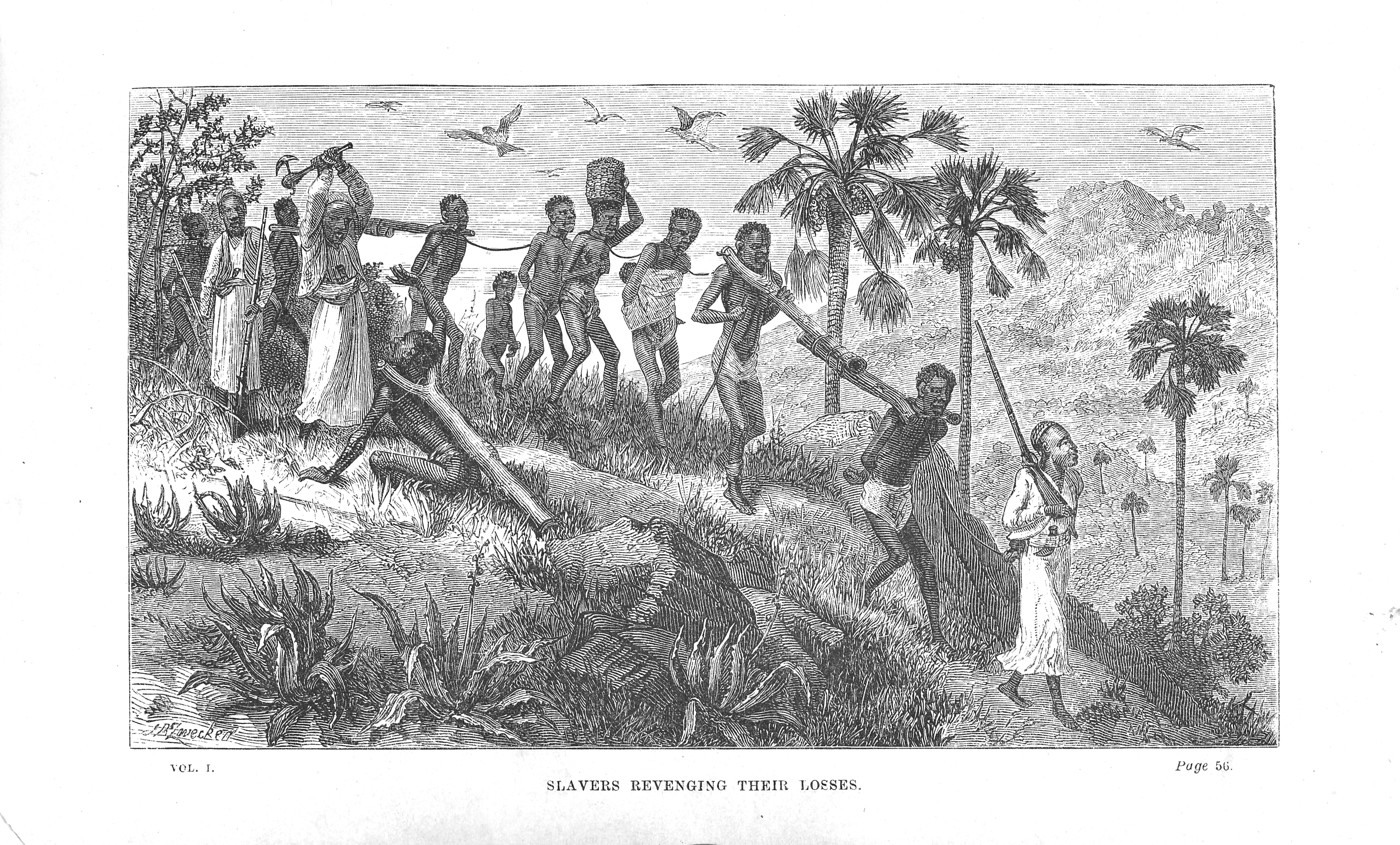
Arab-Swahili slave traders and their captives on the Ruvuma River in East Africa, 19th century

Under Omani Arabs, Zanzibar became East Africa's main slave port, with as many as 50,000 African slaves passing through every year during the 19th century. Some historians estimate that between 11 and 18 million African slaves crossed the Red Sea, Indian Ocean, and Sahara Desert from 650 to 1900 AD. Eduard Rüppell described the losses of Nuba slaves from Southern sudan being transported on foot to Egypt: "after the Daftardar bey's 1822 campaign in the southern Nuba mountains, nearly 40,000 slaves were captured. However, through bad treatment, disease and desert travel barely 5,000 made it to Egypt." W.A. Veenhoven wrote: "The German doctor, Gustav Nachtigal, an eye-witness, believed that for every slave who arrived at a market three or four died on the way ... Keltie (The Partition of Africa, London, 1920) believes that for every slave the Arabs brought to the coast at least six died on the way or during the slavers' raid. Livingstone puts the figure as high as ten to one."

Systems of servitude and slavery were common in parts of Africa, as they were in much of the ancient world. In many African societies where slavery was prevalent, the slaves were not treated as chattel slaves and were given certain rights in a system similar to indentured servitude elsewhere in the world. The forms of slavery in Africa were closely related to kinship structures. In many African communities, where land could not be owned, enslavement of individuals was used as a means to increase the influence a person had and expand connections. This made slaves a permanent part of a master's lineage and the children of slaves could become closely connected with the larger family ties. Children of slaves born into families could be integrated into the master's kinship group and rise to prominent positions within society, even to the level of chief in some instances. However, stigma often remained attached and there could be strict separations between slave members of a kinship group and those related to the master. Slavery was practiced in many different forms: debt slavery, enslavement of war captives, military slavery, and criminal slavery were all practiced in various parts of Africa. Slavery for domestic and court purposes was widespread throughout Africa.

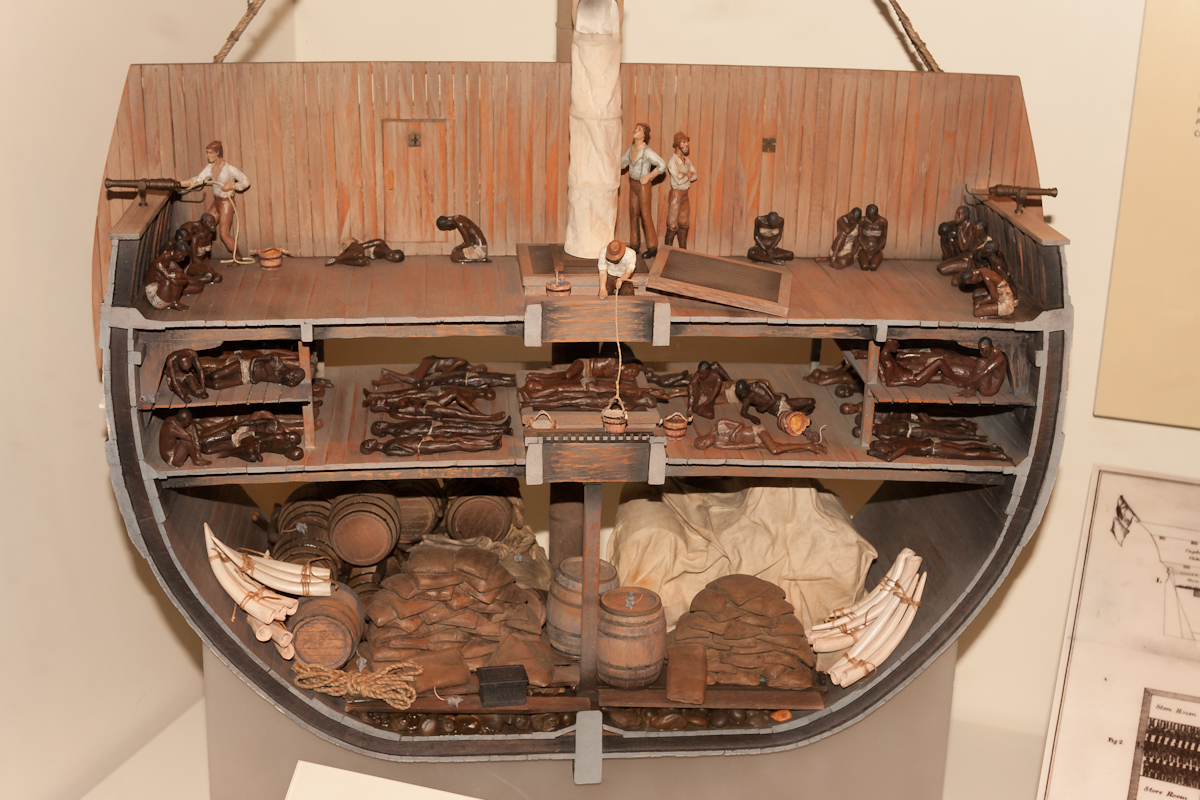
A model showing a cross-section of a typical 1700s European slave ship on the Middle Passage, National Museum of American History

When the Atlantic slave trade began, many of the local slave systems began supplying captives for chattel slave markets outside Africa. Although the Atlantic slave trade was not the only slave trade from Africa, it was the largest in volume and intensity. As Elikia M'bokolo wrote in Le Monde diplomatique:

The African continent was bled of its human resources via all possible routes. Across the Sahara, through the Red Sea, from the Indian Ocean ports and across the Atlantic. At least ten centuries of slavery for the benefit of the Muslim countries (from the ninth to the nineteenth).... Four million enslaved people exported via the Red Sea, another four million through the Swahili ports of the Indian Ocean, perhaps as many as nine million along the trans-Saharan caravan route, and eleven to twenty million (depending on the author) across the Atlantic Ocean.

The trans-Atlantic slave trade peaked in the late 18th century, when the largest number of slaves were captured on raiding expeditions into the interior of West Africa. These expeditions were typically carried out by African kingdoms, such as the Oyo Empire (Yoruba), the Ashanti Empire, the kingdom of Dahomey, and the Aro Confederacy. It is estimated that about 15 percent of slaves died during the voyage, with mortality rates considerably higher in Africa itself in the process of capturing and transporting indigenous peoples to the ships.

Mauritania was the last country in the world to officially ban slavery, in 1981, with legal prosecution of slaveholders established in 2007.

Even though slavery is illegal throughout Africa, forms of modern slavery continue to occur. The 2023 Global Slavery Index, estimated that about 7 million people in Africa were living in conditions of modern slavery, including approximately 3.8 million in forced labour and 3.2 million in forced marriage. Descent-based slavery, in which slave status is inherited, has also continued to be reported in parts of the Sahel, including Mali, Mauritania, Niger, Chad and Sudan..

=== Middle East ===
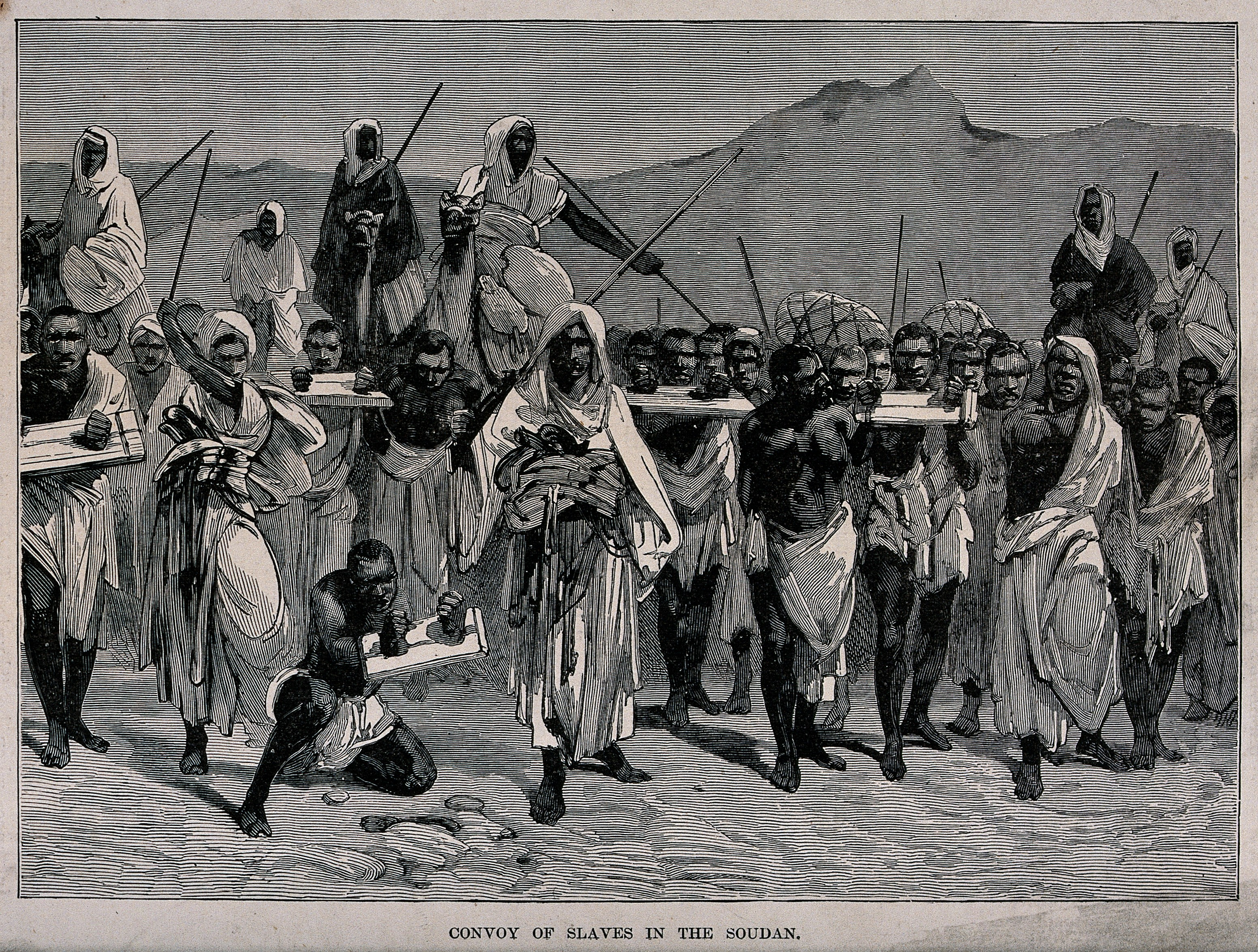
19th-century engraving depicting an Arab slave-trading caravan transporting black African slaves across the Sahara Desert

In the earliest known records, slavery is treated as an established institution. The Code of Hammurabi (c. 1760 BC), for example, prescribed death for anyone who helped a slave escape or who sheltered a fugitive. The Bible mentions slavery as an established institution. Slavery existed in Pharaonic Egypt, but studying it is complicated by terminology used by the Egyptians to refer to different classes of servitude over the course of history. Interpretation of the textual evidence of classes of slaves in ancient Egypt has been difficult to differentiate by word usage alone. The three apparent types of enslavement in ancient Egypt were chattel slavery, bonded labour, and forced labour.

Following the Islamic conquests of the 7th and 8th century, slavery was regulated by the Islamic law, in parallel to the Middle East being more or less united by a succession of Islamic empires. The history of slavery in the Muslim Middle East was therefore reflected in the slavery of the Islamic empires that succeeded each other between the 7th and the 20th century. Slavery was hence reflected in the institution of slavery in the Rashidun Caliphate (632–661), slavery in the Umayyad Caliphate (661–750), slavery in the Abbasid Caliphate (750–1258), slavery in the Mamluk Sultanate (1258–1517) and slavery in the Ottoman Empire (1517–1922), before slavery was finally abolished in one Muslim country after another during the 20th century.

Historically, slaves in the Arab World came from many different regions, including Sub-Saharan Africa (mainly Zanj), the Caucasus (mainly Circassians), Central Asia (mainly Tartars), and Central and Eastern Europe (mainly Slavs Saqaliba). These slaves were trafficked to the Arab world from Africa via the Trans-Saharan slave trade, the Baqt treaty, the Red Sea slave trade and the Indian Ocean slave trade; from Asia via the Bukhara slave trade; and from Europe via the Prague slave trade, the Venetian slave trade and the Barbary slave trade, respectively.

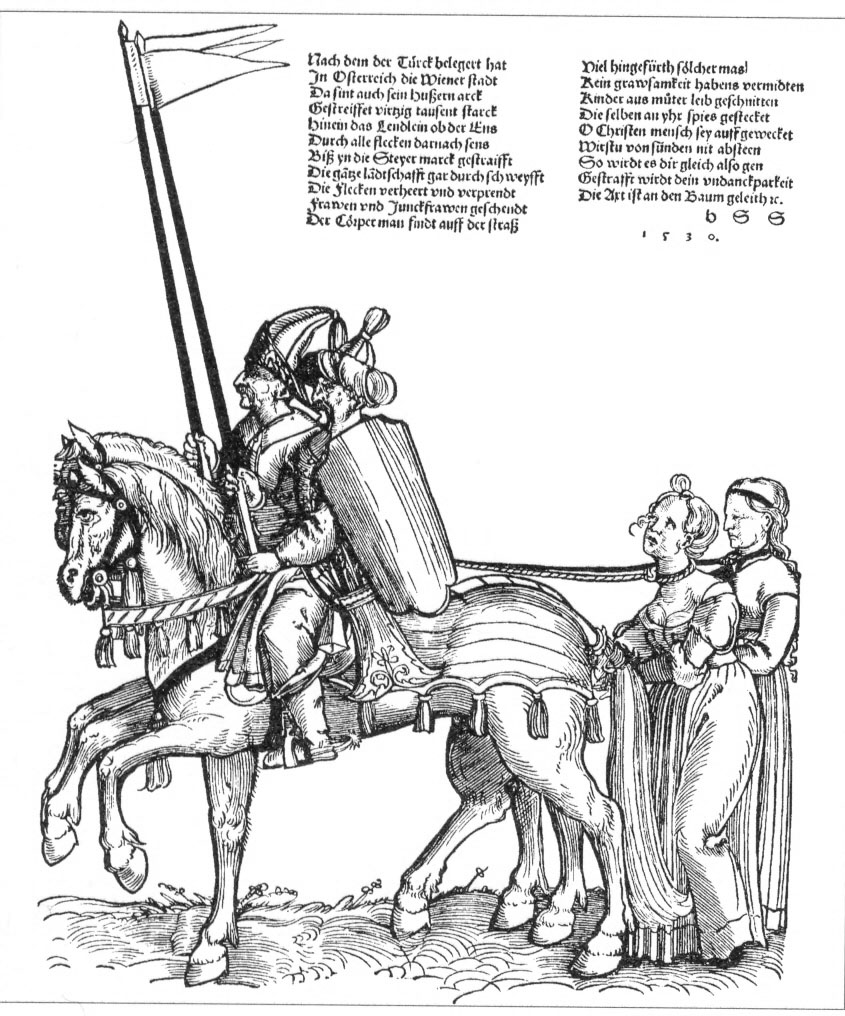
Following the Ottoman wars, people from Central Europe were enslaved in the Ottoman Empire.

Between 1517 and 1917, most of the Middle East consisted of the Ottoman Empire. In the Ottoman capital of Constantinople, about one-fifth of the population consisted of slaves. The city was a major centre of the slave trade in the 15th and later centuries.

Eastern European slaves were provided for slavery in the Ottoman Empire via the Crimean slave trade by Tatar raids on Slavic villages but also by conquest and the suppression of rebellions, in the aftermath of which entire populations were sometimes enslaved and sold across the Empire, reducing the risk of future rebellion. The Ottomans also purchased slaves from traders who brought slaves into the Empire from Europe and Africa. It has been estimated that some 200,000 slaves – mainly Circassians – were imported into the Ottoman Empire between 1800 and 1909. In 1908, women slaves were still sold in the Ottoman Empire. German orientalist, Gustaf Dalman, reported seeing slaves in Muslim houses in Aleppo, belonging to Ottoman Syria, in 1899, and that boys could be bought as slaves in Damascus and Cairo in as late as 1909.

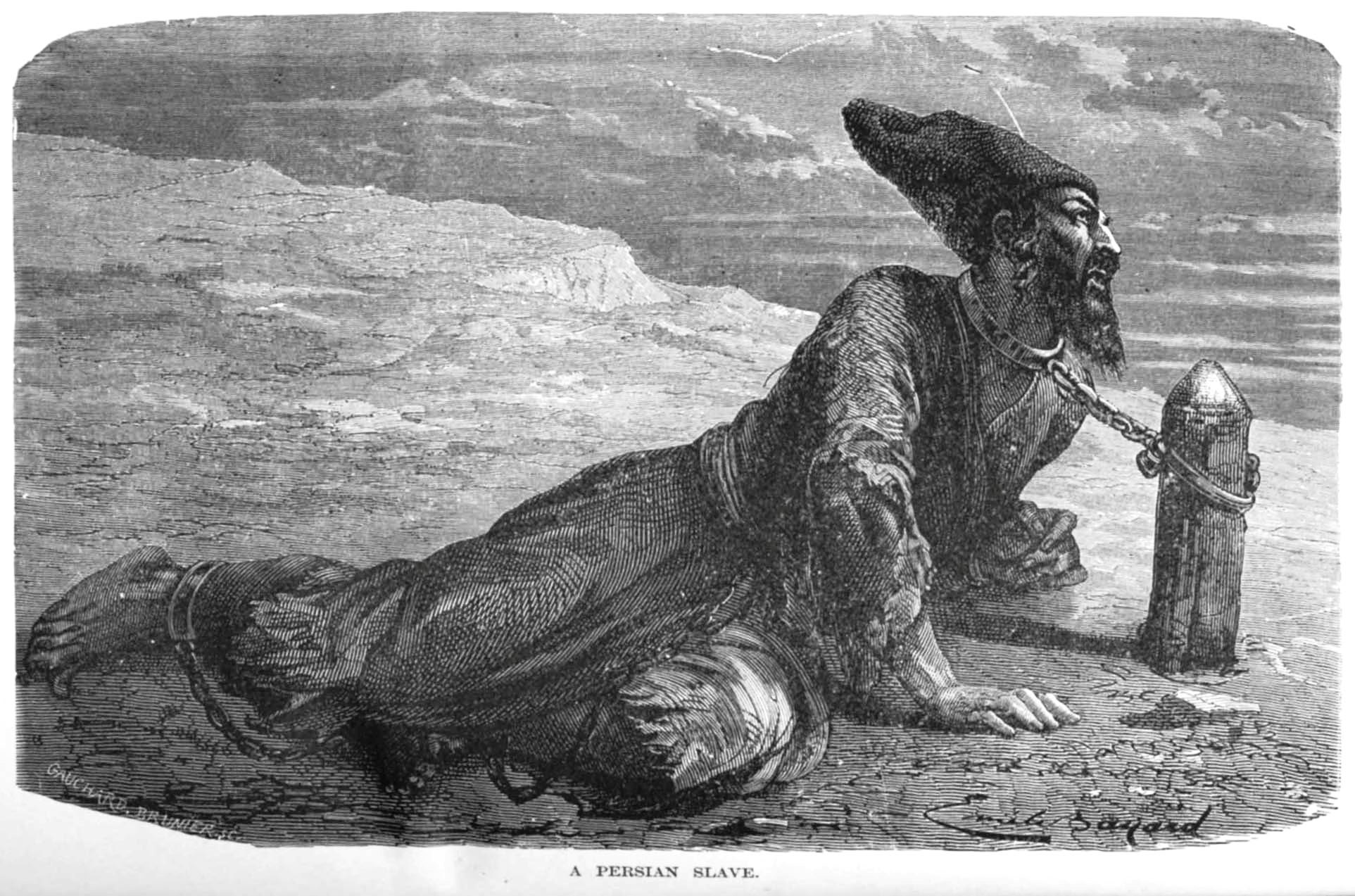
Persian slave in the Khanate of Khiva, 19th century

A major center of slave trade to the Middle east was central Asia, where the Bukhara slave trade had supplied slaves to the Middle East for thousands of years from antiquity until the 1870s. A slave market for captured Russian and Persian slaves was the Khivan slave trade centred in the Central Asian khanate of Khiva. In the early 1840s, the population of the Uzbek states of Bukhara and Khiva included about 900,000 slaves.

By 1870, chattel slavery had been at least formally banned in most areas of the world, with the exception of Muslim lands in Caucasus, Africa, and the Persian Gulf. While slavery was by the 1870s viewed as morally unacceptable in the West, slavery was not considered to be immoral in the Muslim world since it was an institution recognized (halal) in the Quran and morally justified under the guise of warfare against non-Muslims (kafir of Dar al-Harb), and non-Muslims were kidnapped and enslaved by Muslims around the Muslim world: in the Balkans, the Caucasus, the Baluchistan, India, South West Asia and the Philippines. Slaves where marched in shackles to the coasts of Sudan, Ethiopia and Somali, placed upon dhows and trafficked across the Indian Ocean to the Gulf of Aden, or across the Red Sea to Arabia and Aden, with weak slaves being thrown in the sea; or across the Sahara desert via the Trans-Saharan slave trade to the Nile, while dying from exposure and swollen feet.

Ottoman anti slavery laws where not enforced in the late 19th-century, particularly not in Hejaz; the first attempt to ban the Red Sea slave trade in 1857, the firman of 1857, resulted in a rebellion in the Hejaz Province, the Hejaz rebellion, which resulted in Hejaz being exempted from the ban. The Anglo-Ottoman Convention of 1880 formally banned the Red Sea slave trade, but it was not enforced in the Ottoman Provinces in the Arabian Peninsula. In the late 19th century, the Sultan of Morocco stated to Western diplomats that it was impossible for him to ban slavery because such a ban would not be enforceable, but the British asked him to ensure that the slave trade in Morocco would at least be handled discreet and away from the eyes of foreign witnesses.

Chattel slavery lasted in most of the Middle East until the 20th century. The Red Sea slave trade still provided enslaved people from Africa to the Arabian Peninsula after World War II. As recently as the 1960s, Saudi Arabia's slave population was estimated at 300,000. Along with Yemen, the Saudis abolished slavery in 1962.

=== Americas ===
Enslavement in the Americas existed before European arrival and was used for numerous reasons. Slavery in Mexico can be traced back to the Aztecs. Other Amerindians, such as the Inca of the Andes, the Tupinambá of Brazil, the Creek of Georgia, and the Comanche of Texas, also practiced slavery.

Slavery in Canada was practiced by First Nations and by European settlers. Slave-owning people of what became Canada were, for example, the fishing societies, such as the Yurok, that lived along the Pacific coast from Alaska to California, on what is sometimes described as the Pacific or Northern Northwest Coast. Some of the indigenous peoples of the Pacific Northwest Coast, such as the Haida and Tlingit, were traditionally known as fierce warriors and slave-traders, raiding as far as California. Slavery was hereditary, the slaves being prisoners of war and their descendants were slaves. Some nations in British Columbia continued to segregate and ostracize the descendants of slaves as late as the 1970s.

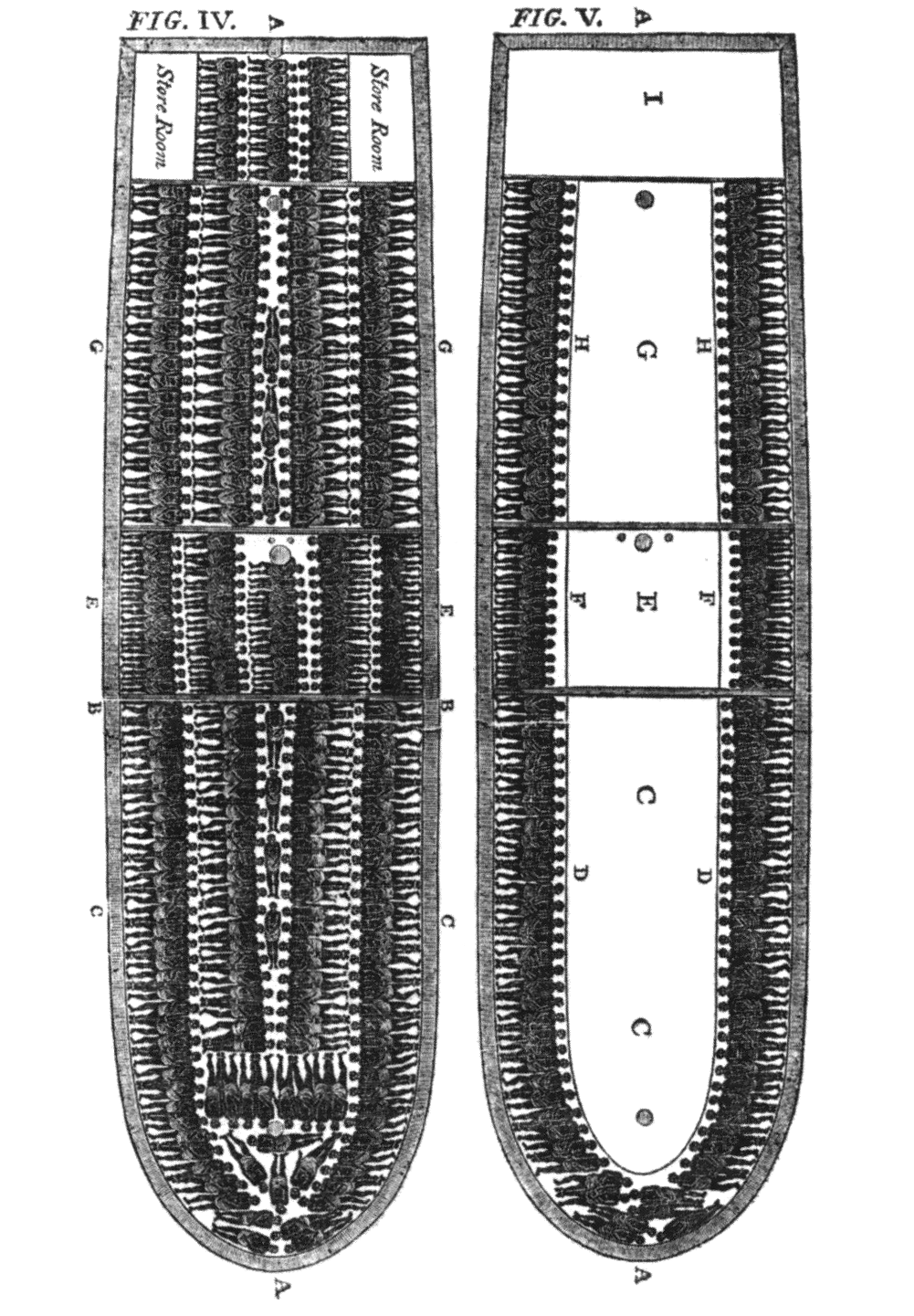
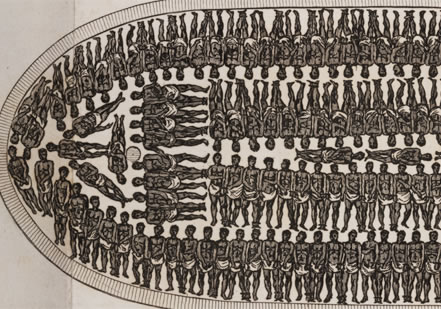
Diagrams of a slave ship and the alignment of captive slaves during the Atlantic slave trade

Slavery in America remains a contentious issue and played a major role in the history and evolution of some countries, triggering a revolution, a civil war, and numerous rebellions.

The countries that controlled most of the transatlantic slave market in terms of number of slaves shipped were the UK, Portugal and France.

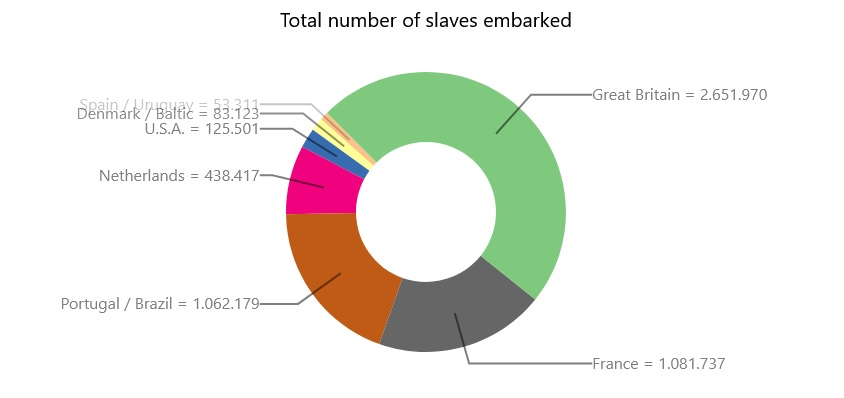
Slaves embarked to America from 1450 until 1800 by country

In order to establish itself as an American empire, Spain had to fight against the relatively powerful civilizations of the New World. The Spanish conquest of the indigenous peoples in the Americas included using the Natives as forced labour. The Spanish colonies were the first Europeans to use African slaves in the New World on islands such as Cuba and Hispaniola. It was argued by some contemporary writers to be intrinsically immoral. Bartolomé de las Casas, a 16th-century Dominican friar and Spanish historian, participated in campaigns in Cuba (at Bayamo and Camagüey) and was present at the massacre of Hatuey; his observation of that massacre led him to fight for a social movement away from the use of natives as slaves. Also, the alarming decline in the native population had spurred the first royal laws protecting the native population. The first African slaves arrived in Hispaniola in 1501. This era saw a growth in race-based slavery. England played a prominent role in the Atlantic slave trade. The "slave triangle" was pioneered by Francis Drake and his associates, though English slave-trading would not take off until the mid-17th century.

Many whites who arrived in North America during the 17th and 18th centuries came under contract as indentured servants. The transformation from indentured servitude to slavery was a gradual process in Virginia. The earliest legal documentation of such a shift was in 1640 where a black man, John Punch, was sentenced to lifetime slavery, forcing him to serve his master, Hugh Gwyn, for the remainder of his life, for attempting to run away. This case was significant because it established the disparity between his sentence as a black man and that of the two white indentured servants who escaped with him (one described as Dutch and the other a Scot). It is the first documented case of a black man sentenced to lifetime servitude and is considered one of the first legal cases to make a racial distinction between black and white indentured servants.

After 1640, planters started to ignore the expiration of indentured contracts and keep their servants as slaves for life. This was demonstrated by the 1655 case Johnson v. Parker, where the court ruled that a black man, Anthony Johnson of Virginia, was granted ownership of another black man, John Casor, as the result of a civil case. This was the first instance of a judicial determination in the Thirteen Colonies holding that a person who had committed no crime could be held in servitude for life.

==== Spanish colonial America ====
In Jamaica and elsewhere in the Caribbean area, the Spanish enslaved many of the Taino natives. Some of them escaped, and some hurled themselves and their children off of cliffs to avoid enslavement, but most died from European diseases and overwork. The practice began under Christopher Columbus, who was looking for gold to finance his future expeditions, and was continued by the other conquistadors who followed in his wake.

In 1519, Hernán Cortés brought the first modern slave to Mexico. In the mid-16th century, the Spanish New Laws, prohibited slavery of the indigenous people, including the Aztecs. A labour shortage resulted. This led to the African slaves being imported, as they were not susceptible to smallpox. In exchange, many Africans were afforded the opportunity to buy their freedom, while eventually others were granted their freedom by their masters.

Spain practically did not trade in slaves until 1810 after the rebellions and independence of its American territories or viceroyalties. After the Napoleonic invasions, Spain had lost its industry and its American territories, except in Cuba and Puerto Rico, where the African slave trade to Cuba began on a massive scale from 1810 onwards. It was started by French planters exiled from the French lost colony Saint Domingue (Haiti) who settled in the eastern part of Cuba.

In 1789, the Spanish Crown led an effort to reform slavery, as the demand for slave labour in Cuba was growing. The Crown issued a decree, Código Negro Español (Spanish Black Code), that specified food and clothing provisions, put limits on the number of work hours, limited punishments, required religious instruction, and protected marriages, forbidding the sale of young children away from their mothers. The British made other changes to the institution of slavery in Cuba. However, planters often flouted the laws and protested against them, considering them a threat to their authority and an intrusion into their personal lives.

==== English and Dutch Caribbean ====
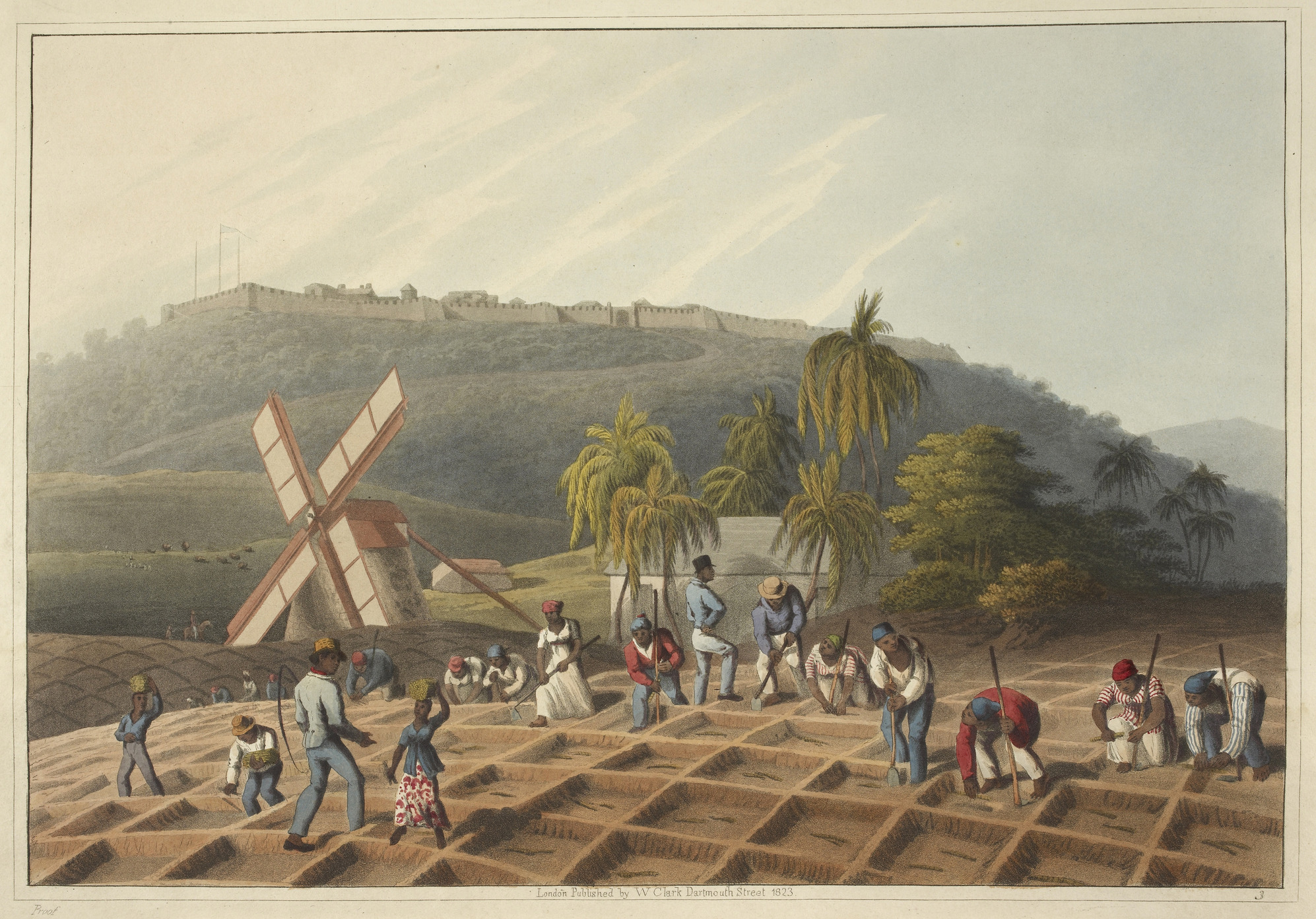
Planting the sugar cane (Bodkins, Antigua, 1823)

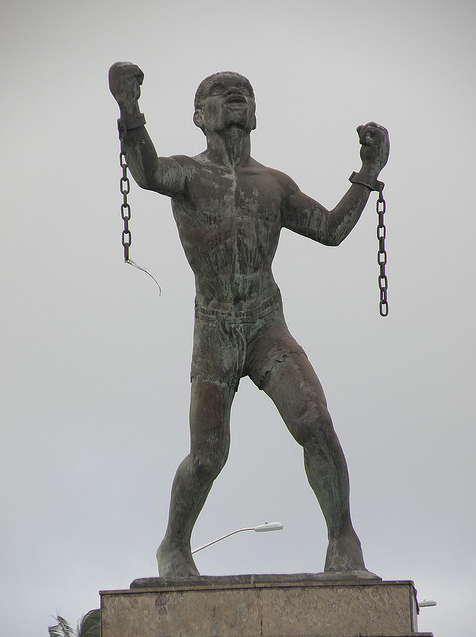
Statue of Bussa, who led the largest slave rebellion in Barbadian history

In the early 17th century, the majority of the labour in Barbados was provided by European indentured servants, mainly English, Irish and Scottish, with African and native American slaves providing little of the workforce. The introduction of sugar cane in 1640 completely transformed society and the economy. Barbados eventually had one of the world's largest sugar industries. The workable sugar plantation required a large investment and a great deal of heavy labour. At first, Dutch traders supplied the equipment, financing, and African slaves, in addition to transporting most of the sugar to Europe. In 1644, the population of Barbados was estimated at 30,000, of which about 800 were of African descent, with the remainder mainly of English descent. By 1700, there were 15,000 free whites and 50,000 enslaved Africans. In Jamaica, although the African slave population in the 1670s and 1680s never exceeded 10,000, by 1800 it had increased to over 300,000. The increased implementation of slave codes or black codes, which created differential treatment between Africans and the white workers and ruling planter class. In response to these codes, several slave rebellions were attempted or planned during this time, but none succeeded.

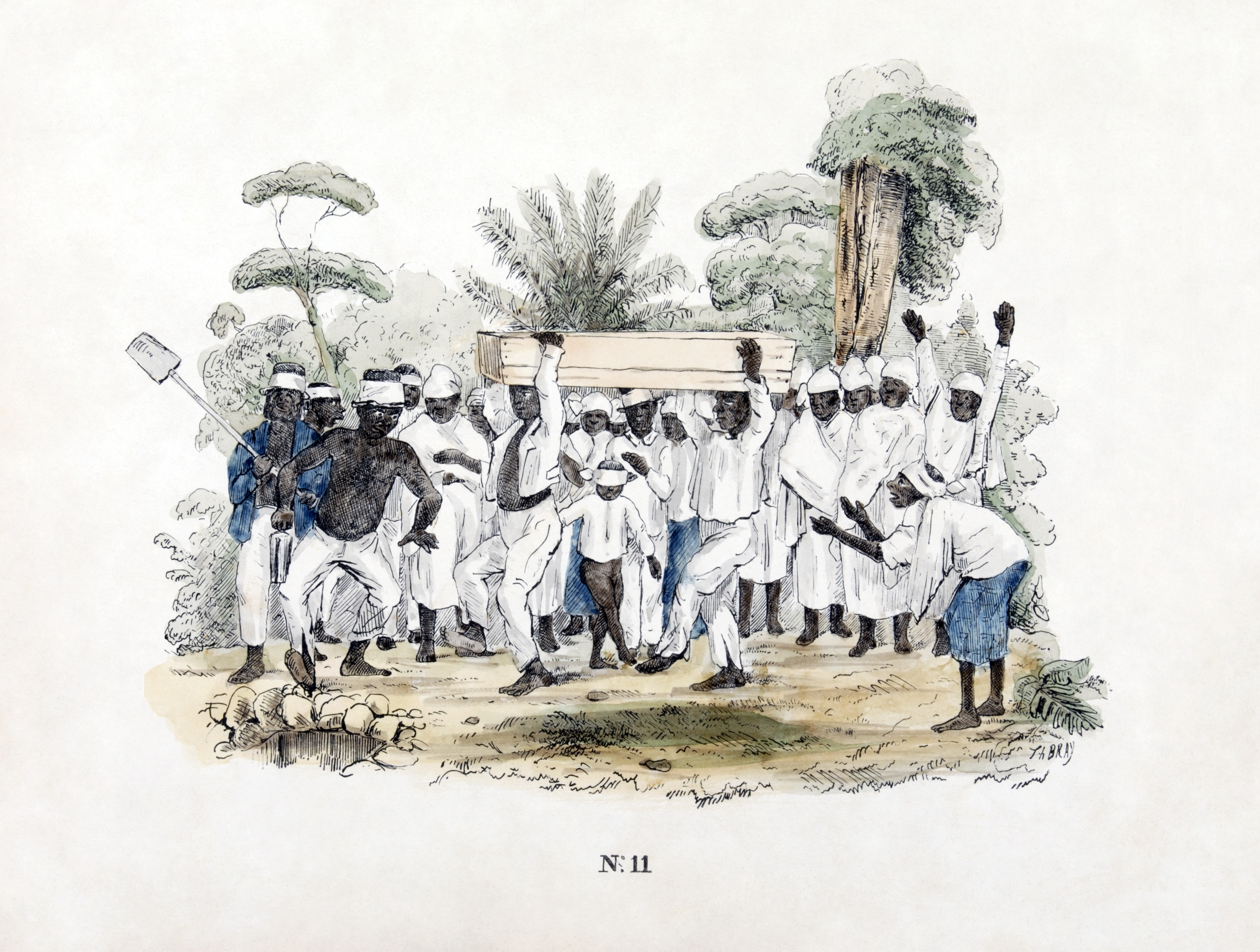
Funeral at slave plantation, Dutch Suriname. 1840–1850.

The planters of the Dutch colony of Suriname relied heavily on African slaves to cultivate, harvest and process the commodity crops of coffee, cocoa, sugar cane and cotton plantations. The Netherlands abolished slavery in Suriname in 1863.

Many slaves escaped the plantations. With the help of the native South Americans living in the adjoining rain forests, these runaway slaves established a new and unique culture in the interior that was highly successful in its own right. They were known collectively in English as Maroons, in French as Nèg'Marrons (literally meaning "brown negroes", that is "pale-skinned negroes"), and in Dutch as Marrons. The Maroons gradually developed several independent tribes through a process of ethnogenesis, as they were made up of slaves from different African ethnicities. These tribes include the Saramaka, Paramaka, Ndyuka or Aukan, Kwinti, Aluku or Boni, and Matawai. The Maroons often raided plantations to recruit new members from the slaves and capture women, as well as to acquire weapons, food and supplies. They sometimes killed planters and their families in the raids. The colonists also mounted armed campaigns against the Maroons, who generally escaped through the rain forest, which they knew much better than did the colonists. To end hostilities, in the 18th century the European colonial authorities signed several peace treaties with different tribes. They granted the Maroons sovereign status and trade rights in their inland territories, giving them autonomy.

==== Brazil ====
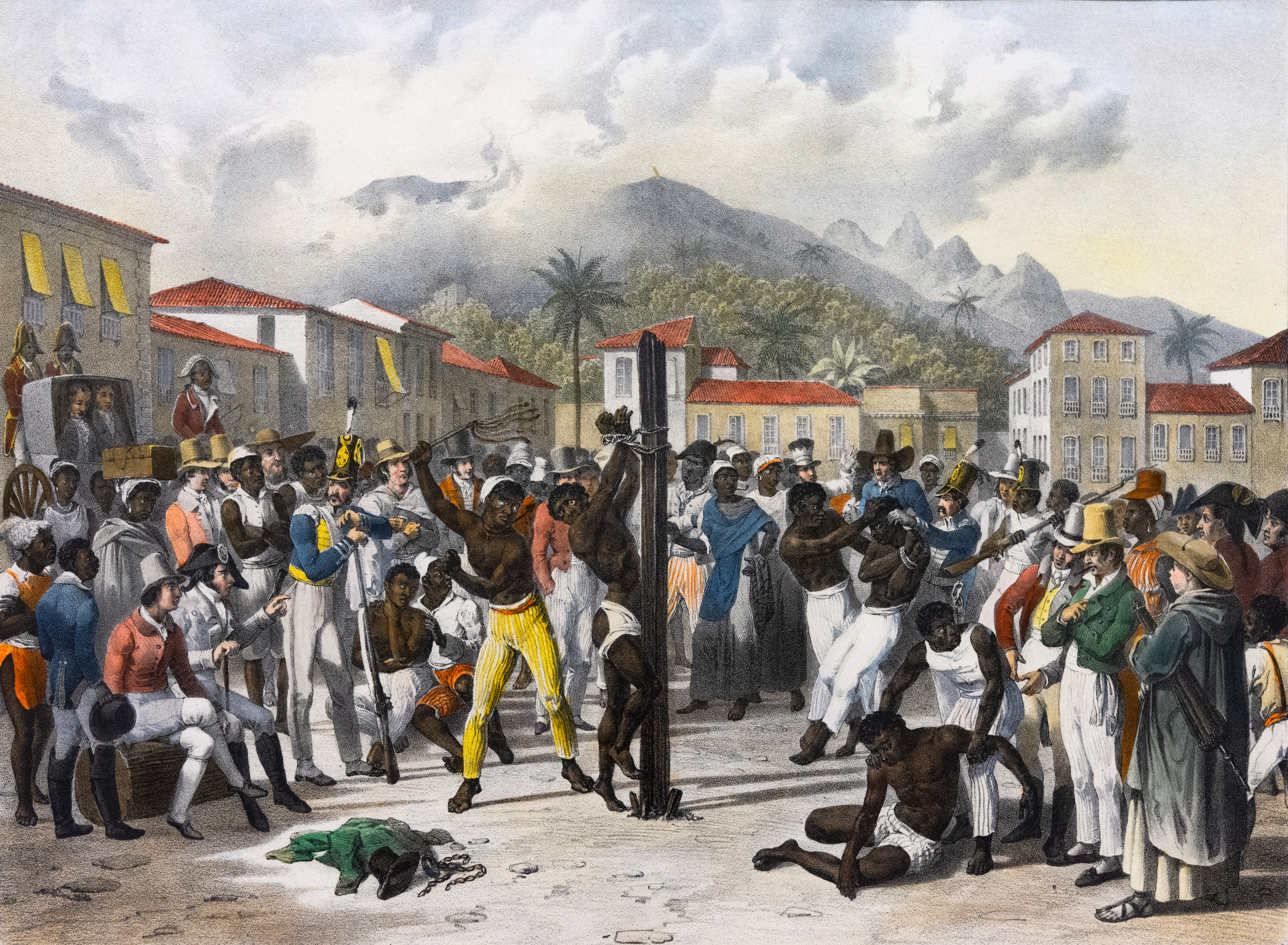
Public flogging of a slave in 19th-century Brazil, by Johann Moritz Rugendas

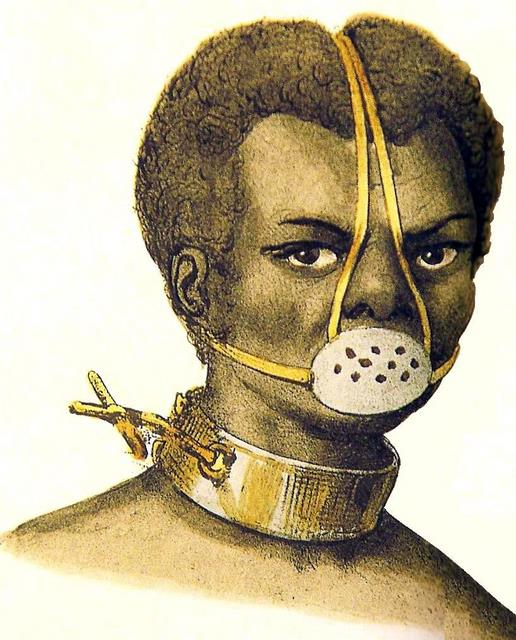
Slave punishment by Jacques Étienne Arago, 1839

Slavery in Brazil began long before the first Portuguese settlement was established in 1532, as members of one tribe would enslave captured members of another.

Later, Portuguese colonists were heavily dependent on indigenous labour during the initial phases of settlement to maintain the subsistence economy, and natives were often captured by expeditions called bandeiras. The importation of African slaves began midway through the 16th century, but the enslavement of indigenous peoples continued well into the 17th and 18th centuries.

During the Atlantic slave trade era, Brazil imported more African slaves than any other country. Nearly 5 million slaves were brought from Africa to Brazil during the period from 1501 to 1866. Until the early 1850s, most African slaves who arrived on Brazilian shores were forced to embark at West Central African ports, especially in Luanda (in present-day Angola). Today, with the exception of Nigeria, the country with the largest population of people of African descent is Brazil.

Slave labour was the driving force behind the growth of the sugar economy in Brazil, and sugar was the primary export of the colony from 1600 to 1650. Gold and diamond deposits were discovered in Brazil in 1690, which sparked an increase in the importation of African slaves to power this newly profitable market. Transportation systems were developed for the mining infrastructure, and population boomed from immigrants seeking to take part in gold and diamond mining. Demand for African slaves did not wane after the decline of the mining industry in the second half of the 18th century. Cattle ranching and foodstuff production proliferated after the population growth, both of which relied heavily on slave labour. 1.7 million slaves were imported to Brazil from Africa from 1700 to 1800, and the rise of coffee in the 1830s further enticed expansion of the slave trade.

Brazil was the last country in the Western world to abolish slavery. Forty percent of the total number of slaves brought to the Americas were sent to Brazil.

==== Haiti ====
Slavery in Haiti began at an unknown time with slavery being already practiced by the native populations when Christopher Columbus on the island in 1492. European colonists would go and institutionalize slavery on the island and turn it into a major business which was devastating to the native population. Following the indigenous Taíno's near decimation from forced labour, disease and war, the Spanish, under advisement of the Catholic priest Bartolomé de las Casas, and with the blessing of the Catholic church, who also wished to protect the indigenous people, began engaging in earnest in the use of African slaves. During the French colonial period beginning in 1625, the economy of Haiti (then known as Saint-Domingue) was based on slavery, and the practice there was regarded as the most brutal in the world.

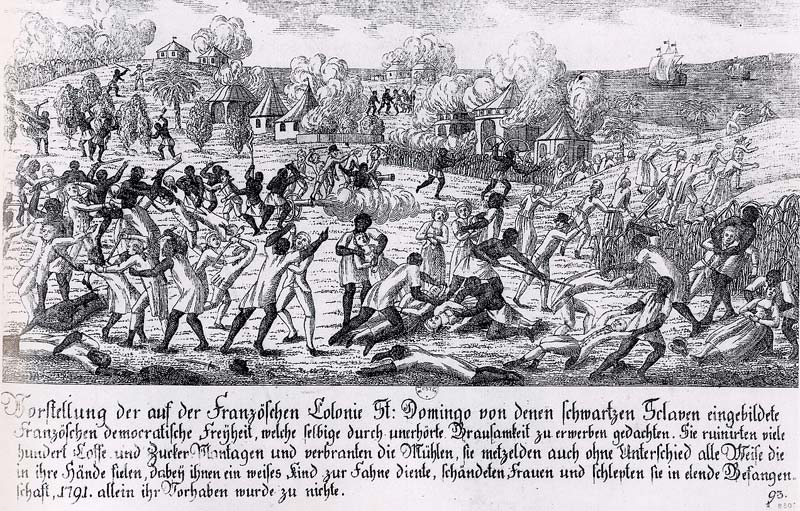
Saint-Domingue slave revolt in 1791

Following the Treaty of Ryswick of 1697, Hispaniola was divided between France and Spain. France received the western third and subsequently named it Saint-Domingue. To develop it into sugarcane plantations, the French imported thousands of slaves from Africa. Sugar was a lucrative commodity crop throughout the 18th century. By 1789, approximately 40,000 white colonists lived in Saint-Domingue. The whites were vastly outnumbered by the tens of thousands of African slaves they had imported to work on their plantations, which were primarily devoted to the production of sugarcane. In the north of the island, slaves were able to retain many ties to African cultures, religion and language; these ties were continually being renewed by newly imported Africans. Blacks outnumbered whites by about ten to one.

The French-enacted Code Noir ("Black Code"), prepared by Jean-Baptiste Colbert and ratified by Louis XIV, had established rules on slave treatment and permissible freedoms. Saint-Domingue has been described as one of the most brutally efficient slave colonies; one-third of newly imported Africans died within a few years. Many slaves died from diseases such as smallpox and typhoid fever. They had birth rates around 3 percent, and there is evidence that some women aborted fetuses, or committed infanticide, rather than allow their children to live within the bonds of slavery.

As in its Louisiana colony, the French colonial government allowed some rights to free people of color: the mixed-race descendants of white male colonists and black female slaves (and later, mixed-race women). Over time, many were released from slavery. They established a separate social class. White French Creole fathers frequently sent their mixed-race sons to France for their education. Some men of color were admitted into the military. More of the free people of color lived in the south of the island, near Port-au-Prince, and many intermarried within their community. They frequently worked as artisans and tradesmen, and began to own some property. Some became slave holders. The free people of color petitioned the colonial government to expand their rights.

Slaves that made it to Haiti from the trans-Atlantic journey and slaves born in Haiti were first documented in Haiti's archives and transferred to France's Ministry of Defense and the Ministry of Foreign Affairs. As of 2015, these records are in The National Archives of France. According to the 1788 Census, Haiti's population consisted of nearly 40,000 whites, 30,000 free coloureds and 450,000 slaves.

The Haitian Revolution of 1804, the only successful slave revolt in human history, precipitated the end of slavery in all French colonies, which came in 1848.

==== United States ====
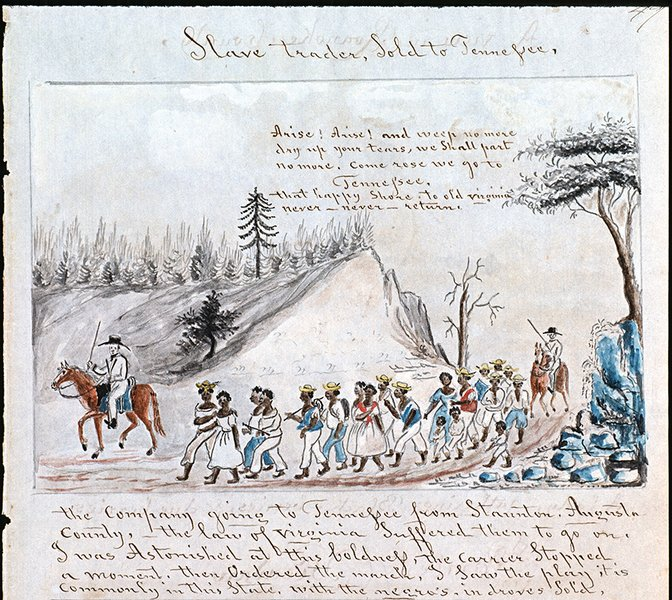
A coffle of slaves being driven on foot from Staunton, Virginia, to Tennessee in 1850

Slavery in the United States was the legal institution of human chattel enslavement, primarily of Africans and African Americans, that existed in the United States of America in the 18th and 19th centuries, after it gained independence from the British and before the end of the American Civil War. Slavery had been practiced in British America from early colonial days and was legal in all Thirteen Colonies, at the time of the Declaration of Independence in 1776. By the time of the American Revolution, the status of slave had been institutionalized as a racial caste associated with African ancestry. The United States became polarized over the issue of slavery, represented by the slave and free states divided by the Mason–Dixon line, which separated free Pennsylvania from slave Maryland and Delaware.

Congress, during the Jefferson administration, prohibited the importation of slaves, effective 1808, although smuggling (illegal importing) was not unusual. Domestic slave trading, however, continued at a rapid pace, driven by labour demands from the development of cotton plantations in the Deep South. Those states attempted to extend slavery into the new western territories to keep their share of political power in the nation. Such laws proposed to Congress to continue the spread of slavery into newly ratified states include the Kansas-Nebraska Act.

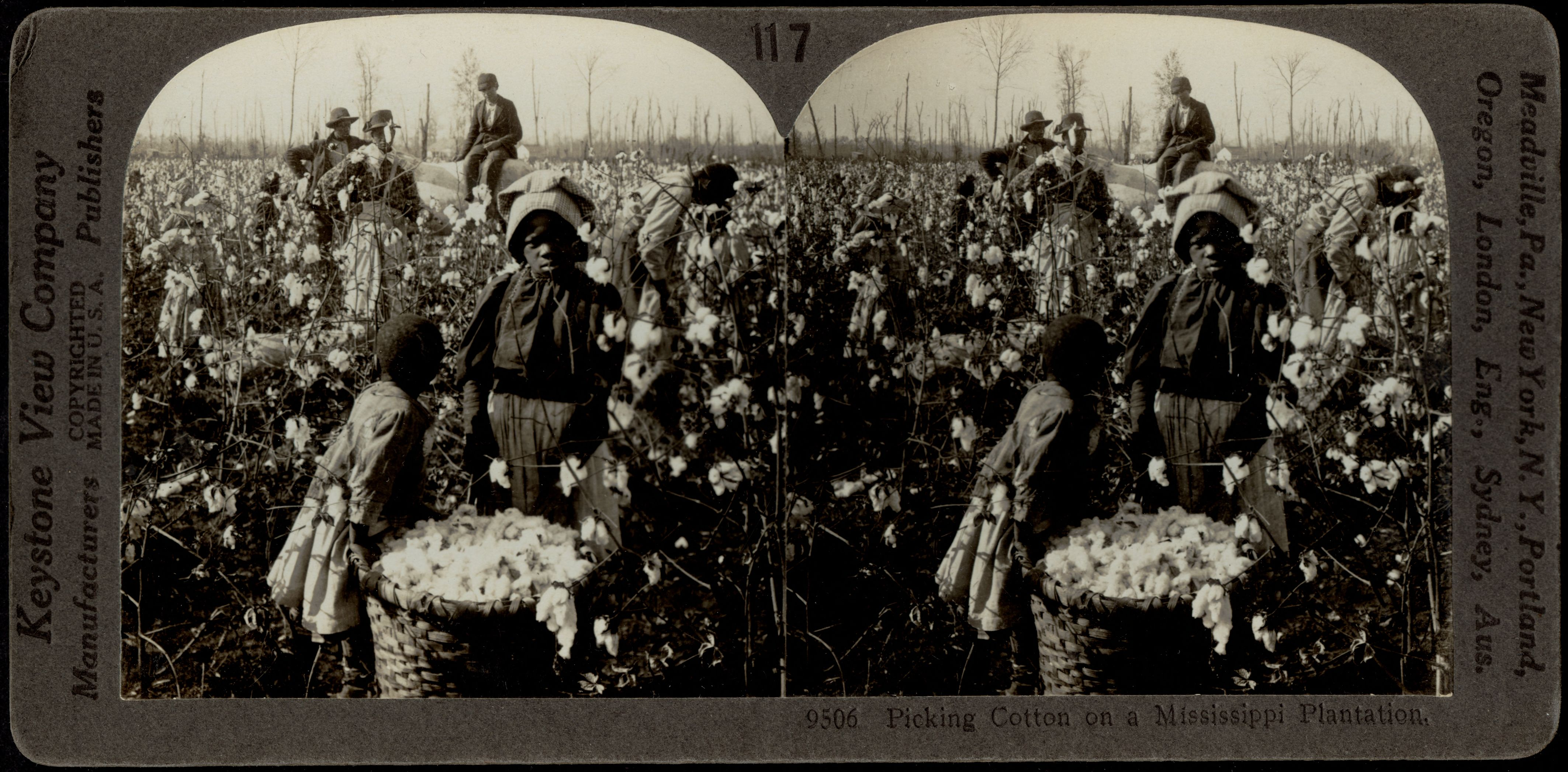
A Black family works a cotton plantation in Mississippi. The subtitle says "We'se done all dis's morning".

The treatment of slaves in the United States varied widely depending on conditions, times, and places. The power relationships of slavery corrupted many whites who had authority over slaves, with children showing their own cruelty. Masters and overseers resorted to physical punishments to impose their wills. Slaves were punished by whipping, shackling, hanging, beating, burning, mutilation, branding and imprisonment. Punishment was most often meted out in response to disobedience or perceived infractions, but sometimes abuse was carried out to re-assert the dominance of the master or overseer of the slave. Treatment was usually harsher on large plantations, which were often managed by overseers and owned by absentee slaveholders.

William Wells Brown, who escaped to freedom, reported that on one plantation, slave men were required to pick 80 pounds (36 kg) of cotton per day, while women were required to pick 70 pounds (32 kg) per day; if any slave failed in their quota, they were subject to whip lashes for each pound they were short. The whipping post stood next to the cotton scales. A New York man who attended a slave auction in the mid-19th century reported that at least three-quarters of the male slaves he saw at sale had scars on their backs from whipping. By contrast, small slave-owning families had closer relationships between the owners and slaves; this sometimes resulted in a more humane environment but was not a given.

More than one million slaves were sold from the Upper South, which had a surplus of labour, and taken to the Deep South in a forced migration, splitting up many families. New communities of African American culture were developed in the Deep South, and the total slave population in the South eventually reached 4 million before liberation. In the 19th century, proponents of slavery often defended the institution as a "necessary evil". White people of that time feared that emancipation of black slaves would have more harmful social and economic consequences than the continuation of slavery. The French writer and traveler Alexis de Tocqueville, in Democracy in America (1835), expressed opposition to slavery while observing its effects on American society. He felt that a multiracial society without slavery was untenable, as he believed that prejudice against black people increased as they were granted more rights. Others, like James Henry Hammond argued that slavery was a "positive good" stating: "Such a class you must have, or you would not have that other class which leads progress, civilization, and refinement."

The Southern state governments wanted to keep a balance between the number of slave and free states to maintain a political balance of power in Congress. The new territories acquired from Britain, France, and Mexico were the subject of major political compromises. By 1850, the newly rich cotton-growing South was threatening to secede from the Union, and tensions continued to rise. Many white Southern Christians, including church ministers, attempted to justify their support for slavery as modified by Christian paternalism. The largest denominations, the Baptist, Methodist, and Presbyterian churches, split over the slavery issue into regional organizations of the North and South.

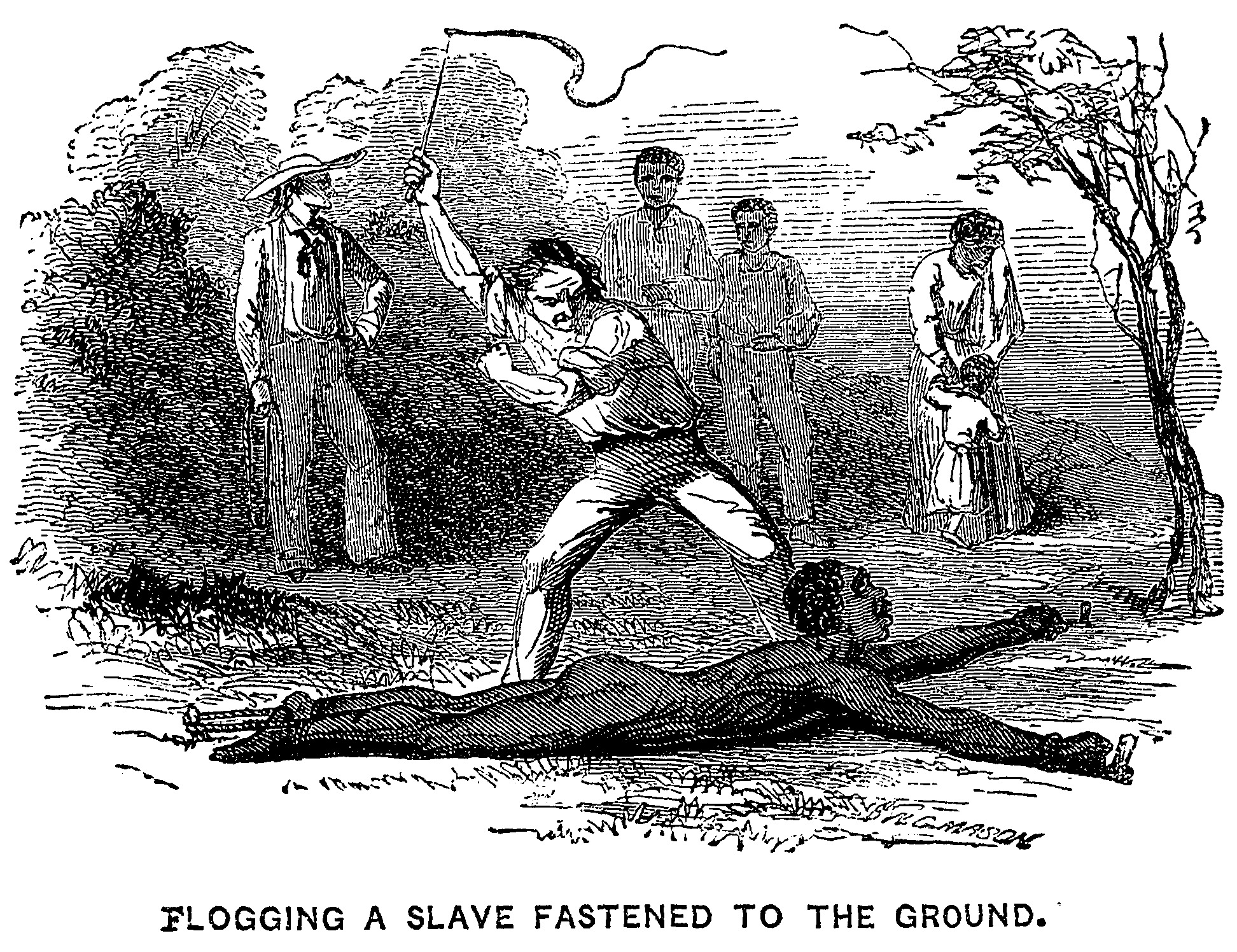
Flogging a slave fastened to the ground, illustration in an 1853 anti-slavery pamphlet

When Abraham Lincoln won the 1860 election on a platform of halting the expansion of slavery, according to the 1860 U.S. census, roughly 400,000 individuals, representing 8% of all U.S. families, owned nearly 4,000,000 slaves. One-third of Southern families owned slaves. The South was heavily invested in slavery. As such, upon Lincoln's election, seven states broke away to form the Confederate States of America. The first six states to secede held the greatest number of slaves in the South. Shortly after, over the issue of slavery, the United States erupted into an all-out Civil War, with slavery legally ceasing as an institution following the war in December 1865.

In 1865, the United States ratified the 13th Amendment to the United States Constitution, which banned slavery and involuntary servitude "except as punishment for a crime whereof the party shall have been duly convicted," providing a legal basis for forced labor to continue in the country. This led to the system of convict leasing, which affected primarily African Americans. The Prison Policy Initiative, an American criminal justice think tank, cites the 2020 US prison population as 2.3 million, and nearly all able-bodied inmates work in some fashion. In Texas, Georgia, Alabama and Arkansas, prisoners are not paid at all for their work. In other states, prisoners are paid between $0.12 and $1.15 per hour. Federal Prison Industries paid inmates an average of $0.90 per hour in 2017. Inmates who refuse to work may be indefinitely remanded into solitary confinement or have family visitation revoked. From 2010 to 2015 and again in 2016 and in 2018, some prisoners in the US refused to work, protesting for better pay, better conditions, and for the end of forced labor. Strike leaders were punished with indefinite solitary confinement. Forced prison labor occurs in both government-run prisons and private prisons. CoreCivic and GEO Group constitute half the market share of private prisons, and they made a combined revenue of $3.5 billion in 2015. The value of all labor by inmates in the United States is estimated to be in the billions. In California, 2,500 incarcerated workers fought wildfires for only $1 per hour through the CDCR's Conservation Camp Program, which saves the state as much as $100 million a year.

=== Asia-Pacific ===
==== East Asia ====
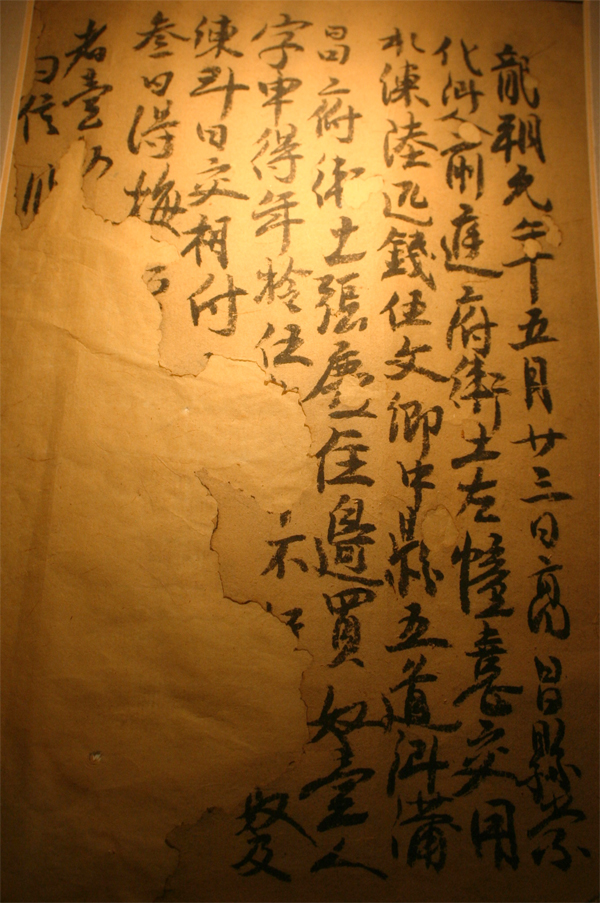
A contract from the Tang dynasty recording the purchase of a 15-year-old slave for six bolts of plain silk and five coins

Slavery existed in ancient China as early as the Shang dynasty. Slavery was employed largely by governments as a means of maintaining a public labour force.

After the Southern and Northern Dynasties, due to years of poor harvests, the influx of foreign tribes, and the resulting wars, the number of slaves exploded. They became a class and were called "jianmin (Chinese: 贱民)" (literally "inferior person"). As stated in The commentary of Tang Code: "Slaves and inferior people are legally equivalent to livestock products". They always had a low social status, and even if they were deliberately murdered, the perpetrators received only a year in prison, and were punished even when they reported the crimes of their lords. However, in the later period of the dynasty, perhaps because the increase in the number of slaves slowed down again, the penalties for crimes against them became harsh again. For example, the famous contemporary female poet Yu Xuanji was publicly executed for murdering her own slave.

Many Han Chinese were enslaved in the process of the Mongol invasion of China proper. According to Japanese historians Sugiyama Masaaki (杉山正明) and Funada Yoshiyuki (舩田善之), Mongolian slaves were owned by Han Chinese during the Yuan dynasty. Slavery has taken various forms throughout China's history. It was reportedly abolished as a legally recognized institution, including in a 1909 law fully enacted in 1910, although the practice continued until at least 1949. Tang Chinese soldiers and pirates enslaved Koreans, Turks, Persians, Indonesians, and people from Inner Mongolia, central Asia, and northern India. The greatest source of slaves came from southern tribes, including Thais and aboriginals from the southern provinces of Fujian, Guangdong, Guangxi, and Guizhou. Malays, Khmers, Indians, and "black skinned" peoples (who were either Austronesian Negritos of Southeast Asia and the Pacific Islands, or Africans, or both) were also purchased as slaves in the Tang dynasty.

In the 17th century Qing dynasty, there was a hereditarily servile people called Booi Aha (Manchu: booi niyalma; Chinese transliteration: 包衣阿哈), which is a Manchu word literally translated as "household person" and sometimes rendered as "nucai." The Manchu was establishing close personal and paternalist relationship between masters and their slaves, as Nurhachi said, "The Master should love the slaves and eat the same food as him". However, booi aha "did not correspond exactly to the Chinese category of "bond-servant slave" (Chinese:奴僕); instead, it was a relationship of personal dependency on a master which in theory guaranteed close personal relationships and equal treatment, even though many western scholars would directly translate "booi" as "bond-servant" (some of the "booi" even had their own servant). Chinese Muslim (Tungans) Sufis who were charged with practicing xiejiao (heterodox religion), were punished by exile to Xinjiang and being sold as a slave to other Muslims, such as the Sufi begs. Han Chinese who committed crimes such as those dealing with opium became slaves to the begs, this practice was administered by Qing law. Most Chinese in Altishahr were exile slaves to Turkestani Begs. While free Chinese merchants generally did not engage in relationships with East Turkestani women, some of the Chinese slaves belonging to begs, along with Green Standard soldiers, Bannermen, and Manchus, engaged in affairs with the East Turkestani women that were serious in nature.

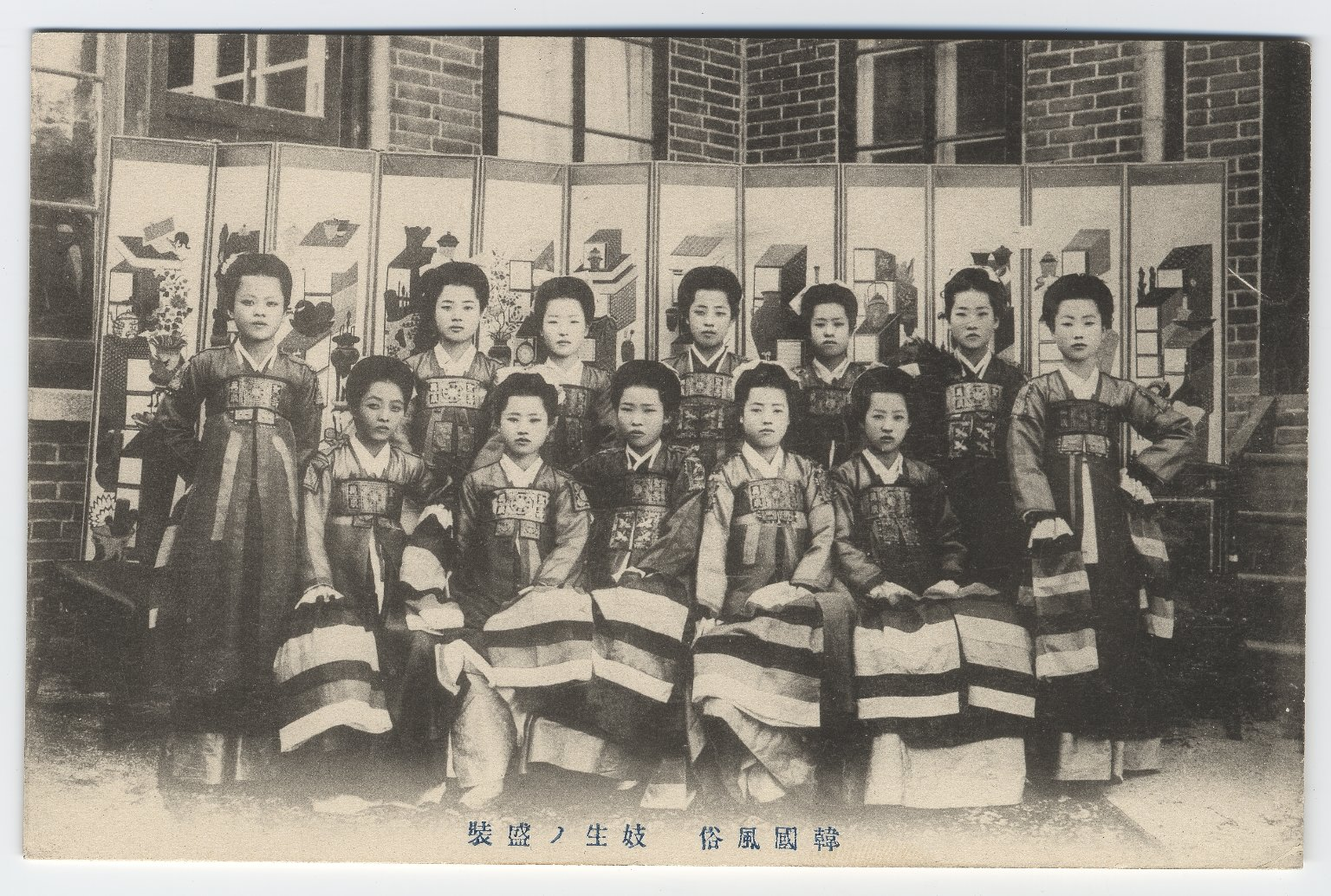
Kisaeng, women from outcast or slave families who were trained to provide entertainment, conversation, and sexual services to men of the upper class

Slavery in Korea existed since before the Three Kingdoms of Korea period, in the first century BCE. Slavery has been described as "very important in medieval Korea, probably more important than in any other East Asian country, but by the 16th century, population growth was making [it] unnecessary". Slavery went into decline around the 10th century but came back in the late Goryeo period when Korea also experienced multiple slave rebellions. In the Joseon period of Korea, members of the slave class were known as nobi. The nobi were socially indistinct from freemen (i.e., the middle and common classes) other than the ruling yangban class, and some possessed property rights, and legal and civil rights. Hence, some scholars argue that it is inappropriate to call them "slaves", while some scholars describe them as serfs. The nobi population could fluctuate up to about one-third of the total, but on average the nobi made up about 10% of the total population. In 1801, the majority of government nobi were emancipated, and by 1858, the nobi population stood at about 1.5 percent of the Korean population. During the Joseon period, the nobi population could fluctuate up to about one-third of the population, but on average the nobi made up about 10% of the total population. The nobi system declined beginning in the 18th century. Since the outset of the Joseon dynasty and especially beginning in the 17th century, there was harsh criticism among prominent thinkers in Korea about the nobi system. Even within the Joseon government, there were indications of a shift in attitude toward the nobi. King Yeongjo implemented a policy of gradual emancipation in 1775, and he and his successor King Jeongjo made many proposals and developments that lessened the burden on nobi, which led to the emancipation of the vast majority of government nobi in 1801. In addition, population growth, numerous escaped slaves, growing commercialization of agriculture, and the rise of the independent small farmer class contributed to the decline in the number of nobi to about 1.5% of the total population by 1858. The hereditary nobi system was officially abolished around 1886–87, and the rest of the nobi system was abolished with the Gabo Reform of 1894. However, slavery did not completely disappear in Korea until 1930, during Imperial Japanese rule. During the Imperial Japanese occupation of Korea around World War II, some Koreans were used in forced labour by the Imperial Japanese, in conditions which have been compared to slavery. These included women forced into sexual slavery by the Imperial Japanese Army before and during World War II, known as "comfort women".

After the Portuguese first made contact with Japan in 1543, slave trade developed in which Portuguese purchased Japanese as slaves in Japan and sold them to various locations overseas, including Portugal, throughout the 16th and 17th centuries. Many documents mention the slave trade along with protests against the enslavement of Japanese. Japanese slaves are believed to be the first of their nation to end up in Europe, and the Portuguese purchased numbers of Japanese slave girls to bring to Portugal for sexual purposes, as noted by the Church in 1555. Japanese slave women were even sold as concubines to Asian lascar and African crew members, along with their European counterparts serving on Portuguese ships trading in Japan, mentioned by Luis Cerqueira, a Portuguese Jesuit, in a 1598 document. Japanese slaves were brought by the Portuguese to Macau, where they were enslaved to Portuguese or became slaves to other slaves. Some Korean slaves were bought by the Portuguese and brought back to Portugal from Japan, where they had been among the tens of thousands of Korean prisoners of war transported to Japan during the Japanese invasions of Korea (1592–98). Historians pointed out that at the same time Hideyoshi expressed his indignation and outrage at the Portuguese trade in Japanese slaves, he was engaging in a mass slave trade of Korean prisoners of war in Japan. Fillippo Sassetti saw some Chinese and Japanese slaves in Lisbon among the large slave community in 1578, although most of the slaves were black.

The Portuguese also valued Oriental slaves more than the black Africans and the Moors for their rarity. Chinese slaves were more expensive than Moors and blacks and showed off the high status of the owner. The Portuguese attributed qualities like intelligence and industriousness to Chinese, Japanese and Indian slaves. King Sebastian of Portugal feared rampant slavery was having a negative effect on Catholic proselytization, so he commanded that it be banned in 1571. Hideyoshi was so disgusted that his own Japanese people were being sold en masse into slavery on Kyushu, that he wrote a letter to Jesuit Vice-Provincial Gaspar Coelho on July 24, 1587, to demand the Portuguese, Siamese (Thai), and Cambodians stop purchasing and enslaving Japanese and return Japanese slaves who ended up as far as India. Hideyoshi blamed the Portuguese and Jesuits for this slave trade and banned Christian proselytizing as a result. In 1595, a law was passed by Portugal banning the selling and buying of Chinese and Japanese slaves.

==== South Asia ====
Slavery in India was widespread by the 6th century BC, and perhaps even as far back as the Vedic period. Slavery intensified during the Muslim domination of northern India after the 11th century. Slavery existed in Portuguese India after the 16th century. The Dutch, too, largely dealt in Abyssian slaves, known in India as Habshis or Sheedes. Arakan/Bengal, Malabar, and Coromandel remained the largest sources of forced labour until the 1660s.

Between 1626 and 1662, the Dutch exported on an average 150–400 slaves annually from the Arakan-Bengal coast. During the first 30 years of Batavia's existence, Indian and Arakanese slaves provided the main labour force of the Dutch East India Company, Asian headquarters. An increase in Coromandel slaves occurred during a famine following the revolt of the Nayaka Indian rulers of South India (Tanjavur, Senji, and Madurai) against Bijapur overlordship (1645) and the subsequent devastation of the Tanjavur countryside by the Bijapur army. Reportedly, more than 150,000 people were taken by the invading Deccani Muslim armies to Bijapur and Golconda. In 1646, 2,118 slaves were exported to Batavia, the overwhelming majority from southern Coromandel. Some slaves were also acquired further south at Tondi, Adirampatnam, and Kayalpatnam. Another increase in slaving took place between 1659 and 1661 from Tanjavur as a result of a series of successive Bijapuri raids. At Nagapatnam, Pulicat, and elsewhere, the company purchased 8,000–10,000 slaves, the bulk of whom were sent to Ceylon, while a small portion were exported to Batavia and Malacca. Finally, following a long drought in Madurai and southern Coromandel, in 1673, which intensified the prolonged Madurai-Maratha struggle over Tanjavur and punitive fiscal practices, thousands of people from Tanjavur, mostly children, were sold into slavery and exported by Asian traders from Nagapattinam to Aceh, Johor, and other slave markets.

In September 1687, 665 slaves were exported by the English from Fort St. George, Madras. And, in 1694–96, when warfare once more ravaged South India, a total of 3,859 slaves were imported from Coromandel by private individuals into Ceylon. The volume of the total Dutch Indian Ocean slave trade has been estimated to be about 15–30% of the Atlantic slave trade, slightly smaller than the trans-Saharan slave trade, and one-and-a-half to three times the size of the Swahili and Red Sea coast and the Dutch West India Company slave trades.

According to Sir Henry Bartle Frere (who sat on the Viceroy's Council), there were an estimated 8 or 9 million slaves in India in 1841. About 15% of the population of Malabar were slaves. Slavery was legally abolished in the possessions of the East India Company by the Indian Slavery Act, 1843.

==== South East Asia ====
The hill tribe people in Indochina were "hunted incessantly and carried off as slaves by the Siamese (Thai), the Anamites (Vietnamese), and the Cambodians". A Siamese military campaign in Laos in 1876 was described by a British observer as having been "transformed into slave-hunting raids on a large scale". The census, taken in 1879, showed that 6% of the population in the Malay sultanate of Perak were slaves. Enslaved people made up about two-thirds of the population in part of North Borneo in the 1880s.

==== Oceania ====
Slaves (he mōkai) had a recognised social role in traditional Māori society in New Zealand. Blackbirding occurred on islands in the Pacific Ocean and Australia, especially in the 19th century.

=== Europe ===
==== Ancient Greece and Rome ====
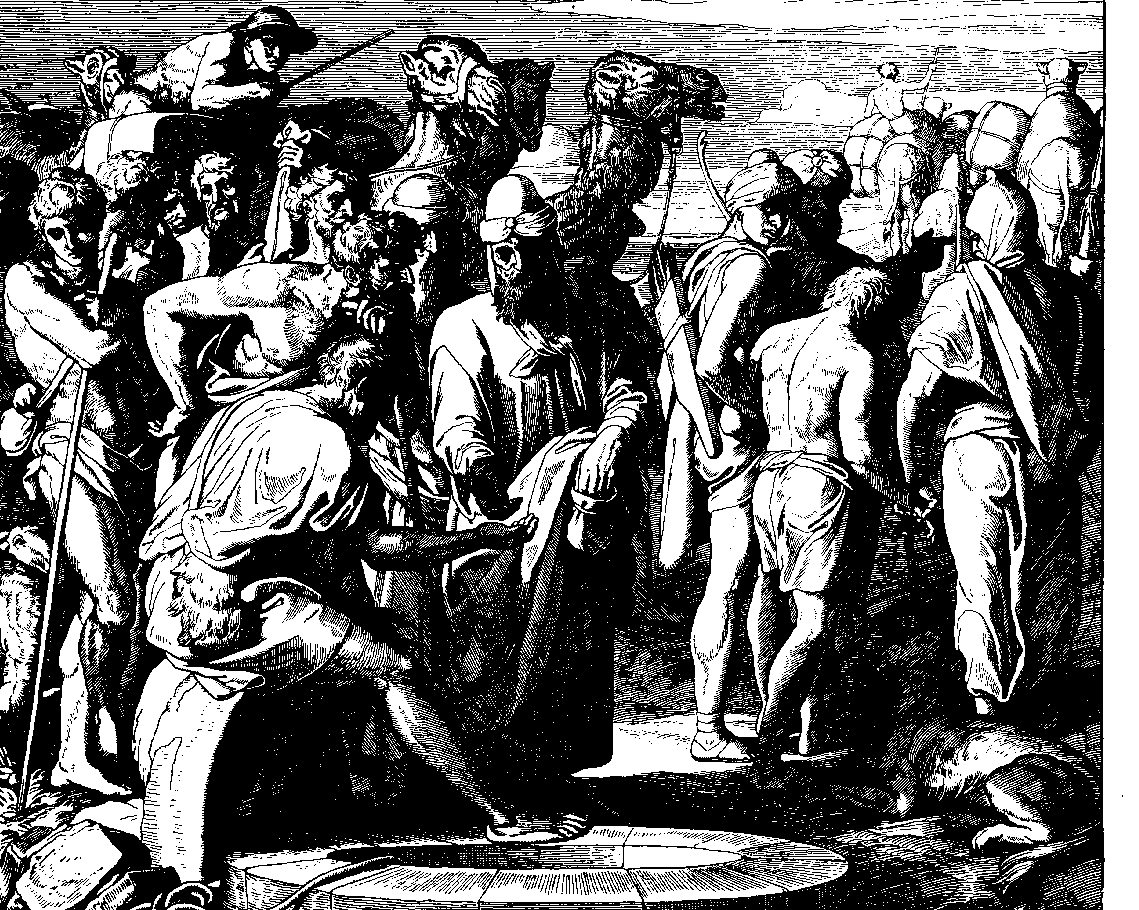
Ishmaelites purchase Joseph, by Schnorr von Carolsfeld, 1860

Records of slavery in Ancient Greece begin with Mycenaean Greece. Classical Athens had the largest slave population, with as many as 80,000 in the 6th and 5th centuries BC. As the Roman Republic expanded outward, entire populations were enslaved, across Europe and the Mediterranean. Slaves were used for labour, as well as for amusement (e.g., gladiators and sex slaves). This oppression by an elite minority eventually led to slave revolts (see Roman Servile Wars); the Third Servile War was led by Spartacus.

By the late Republican era, slavery had become an economic pillar of Roman wealth, as well as Roman society. It is estimated that 25% or more of the population of Ancient Rome was enslaved, although the actual percentage is debated by scholars and varied from region to region. Slaves represented 15–25% of Italy's population, mostly war captives, especially from Gaul and Epirus. Estimates of the number of slaves in the Roman Empire suggest that the majority were scattered throughout the provinces outside of Italy. Generally, slaves in Italy were indigenous Italians. Foreigners (including both slaves and freedmen) born outside of Italy were estimated to have peaked at 5% of the total in the capital, where their number was largest. Those from outside of Europe were predominantly of Greek descent. Jewish slaves never fully assimilated into Roman society, remaining an identifiable minority. These slaves (especially the foreigners) had higher death rates and lower birth rates than natives and were sometimes subjected to mass expulsions. The average recorded age at death for the slaves in Rome was seventeen and a half years (17.2 for males; 17.9 for females).

==== Medieval and early modern Europe ====
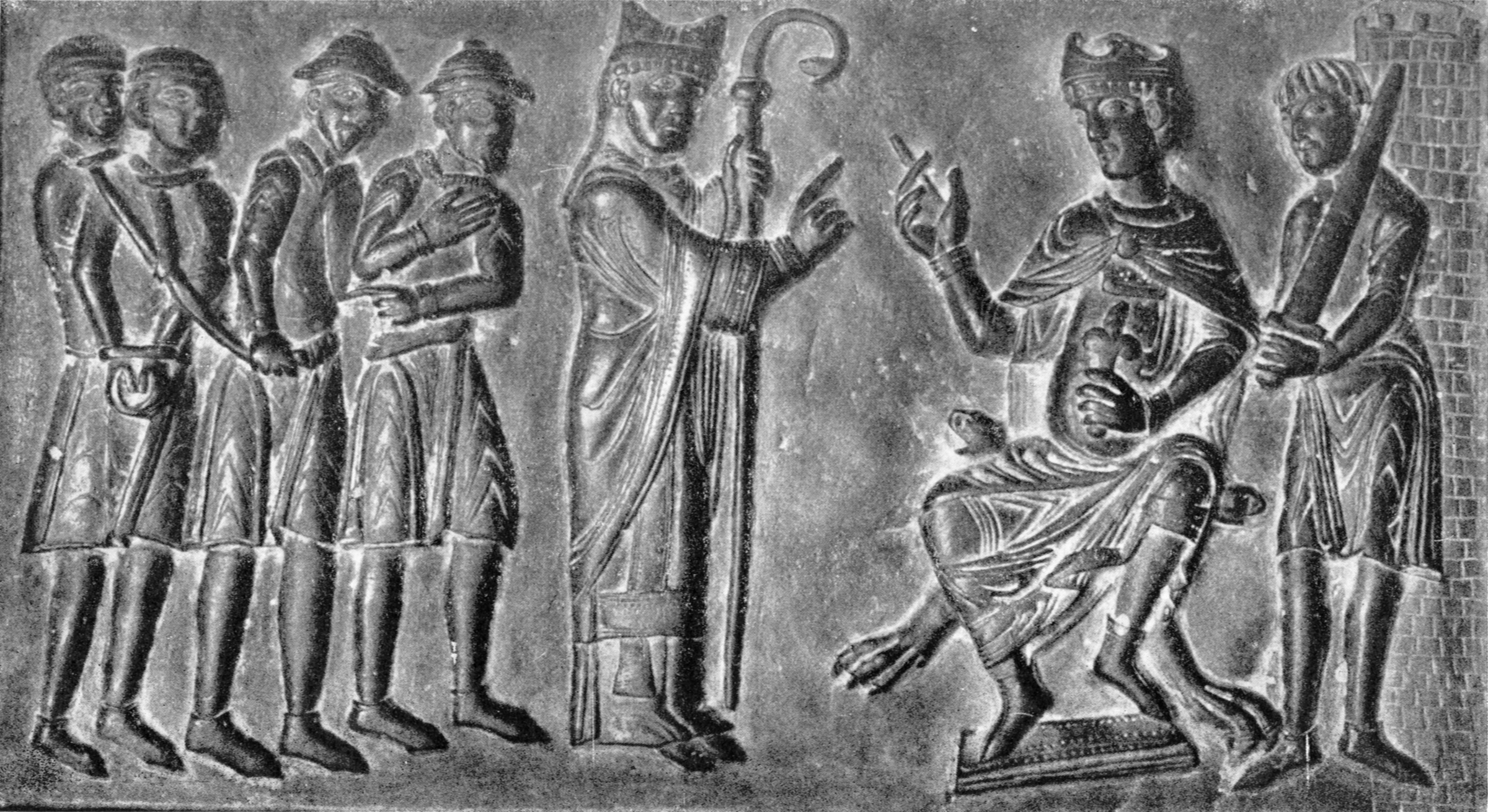
Adalbert of Prague pleads with Boleslaus II, Duke of Bohemia for the release of slaves.

Slavery in early medieval Europe was so common that the Catholic Church repeatedly prohibited it, or at least the export of Christian slaves to non-Christian lands, as for example at the Council of Koblenz (922), the Council of London (1102) (which aimed mainly at the sale of English slaves to Ireland) and the Council of Armagh (1171). Serfdom, on the contrary, was widely accepted. In 1452, Pope Nicholas V issued the papal bull Dum Diversas, granting the kings of Spain and Portugal the right to reduce any "Saracens (Muslims), pagans and any other unbelievers" to perpetual slavery, legitimizing the slave trade as a result of war. The approval of slavery under these conditions was reaffirmed and extended in his Romanus Pontifex bull of 1455. Large-scale trading in slaves was mainly confined to the South and East of early medieval Europe: the Byzantine Empire and the Muslim world were the destinations, while pagan Central and Eastern Europe (along with the Caucasus and Tartary) were important sources. Viking, Arab, Greek, and Radhanite Jewish merchants were all involved in the slave trade during the Early Middle Ages. The trade in European slaves reached a peak in the 10th century following the Zanj Rebellion, which dampened the use of African slaves in the Arab world.

In Britain, slavery continued to be practiced following the fall of Rome, while sections of Æthelstan's and Hywel the Good's laws dealt with slaves in medieval England and medieval Wales respectively. The trade particularly picked up after the Viking invasions, with major markets at Chester and Bristol supplied by Danish, Mercian, and Welsh raiding of one another's borderlands. At the time of the Domesday Book, nearly 10% of the English population were slaves. William the Conqueror introduced a law preventing the sale of slaves overseas. According to historian John Gillingham, by 1200 slavery in the British Isles was non-existent. Slavery had never been authorized by statute within England and Wales, and in 1772, in the case Somerset v Stewart, Lord Mansfield declared that it was also unsupported within England by the common law. The slave trade was abolished by the Slave Trade Act 1807, although slavery remained legal in possessions outside Europe until the passage of the Slavery Abolition Act 1833 and the Indian Slavery Act, 1843. However, when England began to have colonies in the Americas, and particularly from the 1640s, African slaves began to make their appearance in England and remained a presence until the eighteenth century. In Scotland, slaves continued to be sold as chattels until late in the eighteenth century (on the second May 1722, an advertisement appeared in the Edinburgh Evening Courant, announcing that a stolen slave had been found, who would be sold to pay expenses, unless claimed within two weeks).

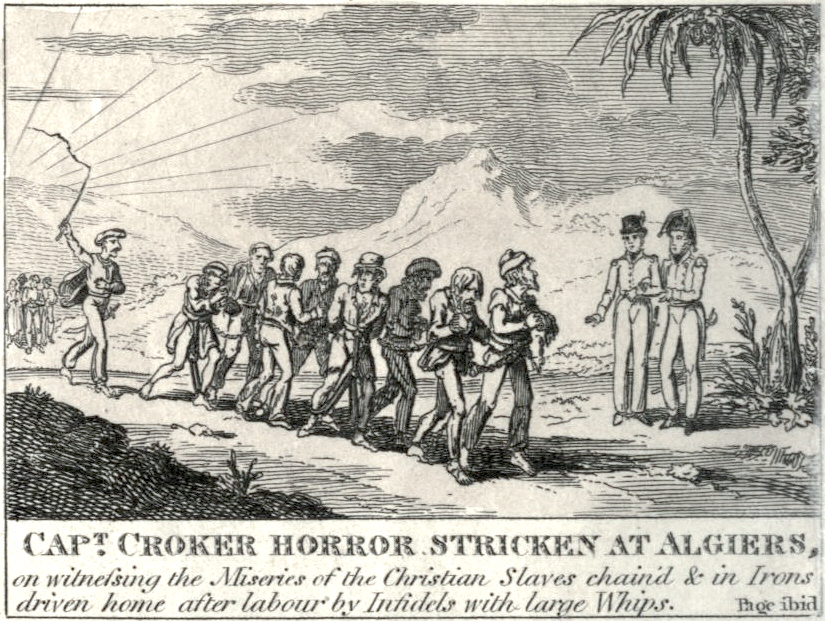
A British captain witnessing the miseries of slaves in Ottoman Algeria, 1815.

The Byzantine-Ottoman wars and the Ottoman wars in Europe brought large numbers of slaves into the Islamic world. To staff its bureaucracy, the Ottoman Empire established a janissary system which seized hundreds of thousands of Christian boys through the devşirme system. They were well cared for but were legally slaves owned by the government and were not allowed to marry. They were never bought or sold. The empire gave them significant administrative and military roles. The system began about 1365; there were 135,000 janissaries in 1826, when the system ended. After the Battle of Lepanto, 12,000 Christian galley slaves were recaptured and freed from the Ottoman fleet. Eastern Europe suffered a series of Tatar invasions, the goal of which was to loot and capture slaves for selling them to Ottomans as jasyr. Seventy-five Crimean Tatar raids were recorded into Poland–Lithuania between 1474 and 1569.

Romani people were enslaved in Romania. It was the longest chattel slavery in Europe.

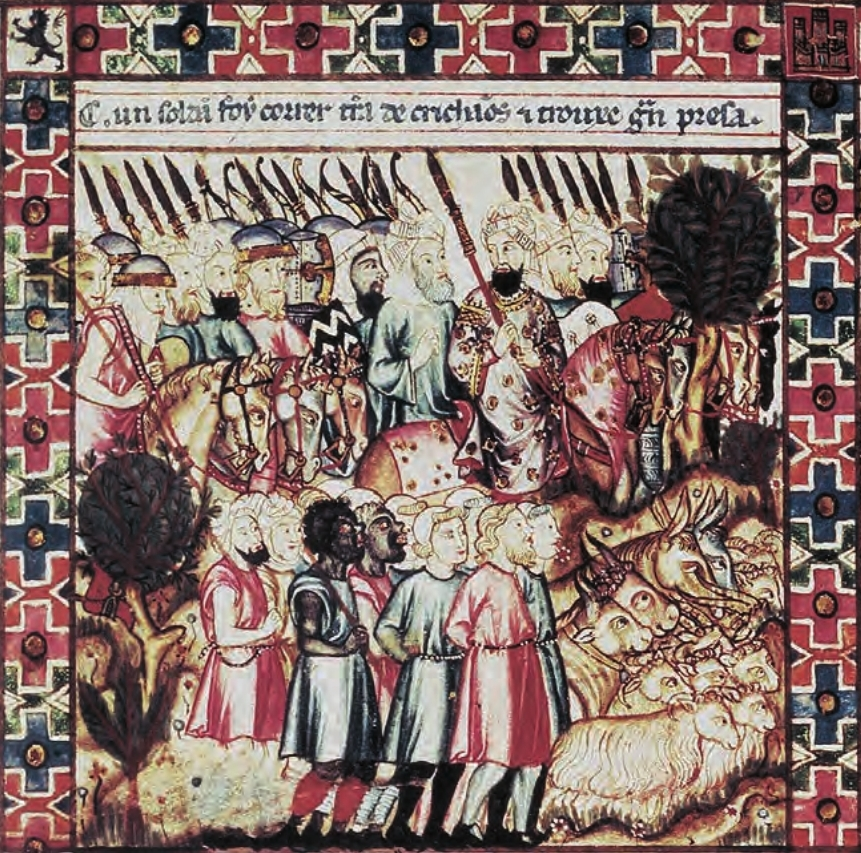
Slavic and African slaves in Córdoba, illustration from Cantigas de Santa Maria, 13th Century

Medieval Spain and Portugal were the scene of almost constant Muslim invasion of the predominantly Christian area. Periodic raiding expeditions were sent from Al-Andalus to ravage the Iberian Christian kingdoms, bringing back booty and slaves. In a raid against Lisbon in 1189, for example, the Almohad caliph Yaqub al-Mansur took 3,000 female and child captives, while his governor of Córdoba, in a subsequent attack upon Silves, Portugal, in 1191, took 3,000 Christian slaves. From the 11th to the 19th century, North African Barbary Pirates engaged in raids on European coastal towns to capture Christian slaves to sell at slave markets in places such as Algeria and Morocco.

The maritime town of Lagos was the first slave market created in Portugal (one of the earliest colonizers of the Americas) for the sale of imported African slaves – the Mercado de Escravos, opened in 1444. In 1441, the first slaves were brought to Portugal from northern Mauritania. By 1552, black African slaves made up 10% of the population of Lisbon. In the second half of the 16th century, the Crown gave up the monopoly on slave trade, and the focus of European trade in African slaves shifted from import to Europe to slave transports directly to tropical colonies in the Americas – especially Brazil. In the 15th century one-third of the slaves were resold to the African market in exchange of gold.

Until the late 18th century, the Crimean Khanate (a Muslim Tatar state) maintained a massive slave trade with the Ottoman Empire and the Middle East. The slaves were captured in southern Russia, Poland-Lithuania, Moldavia, Wallachia, and Circassia by Tatar horsemen and sold in the Crimean port of Kaffa. About 2 million mostly Christian slaves were exported over the 16th and 17th centuries until the Crimean Khanate was destroyed by the Russian Empire in 1783.

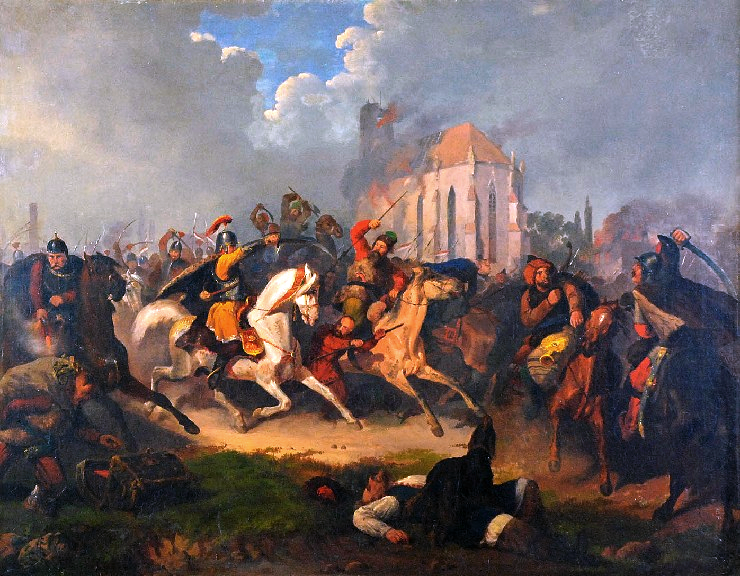
Crimean Tatar raiders enslaved more than 1 million Eastern Europeans.

In Kievan Rus and Muscovy, slaves were usually classified as kholops. According to David P. Forsythe, "In 1649 up to three-quarters of Muscovy's peasants, or 13 to 14 million people, were serfs whose material lives were barely distinguishable from slaves. Perhaps another 1.5 million were formally enslaved, with Russian slaves serving Russian masters." Slavery remained a major institution in Russia until 1723, when Peter the Great converted the household slaves into house serfs. Russian agricultural slaves were formally converted into serfs earlier in 1679. Slavery in Poland was forbidden in the 15th century; in Lithuania, slavery was formally abolished in 1588; they were replaced by the second serfdom.

In Scandinavia, thralldom was abolished in the mid-14th century.

During the Age of Enlightenment, individuals, whether religious or not, held diverse and inconsistent beliefs about race and slavery and despite discussions on individual rights and freedoms; slavery was not abolished, but expanded significantly. The secular enlightenment allowed for scientific racism to emerge as a basis for slavery. It allowed for coexistence of conflicting views on the moral status of black enslavement and the inferior physical status of those people being enslaved, based on the science at the time. The theory of polygenesis (multiple independent human origins) generally lead to support or symapathy with slavery and this was used by nonreligious individuals to counter religious theories of monogenesis (single origin to one couple).

==== Turkey ====
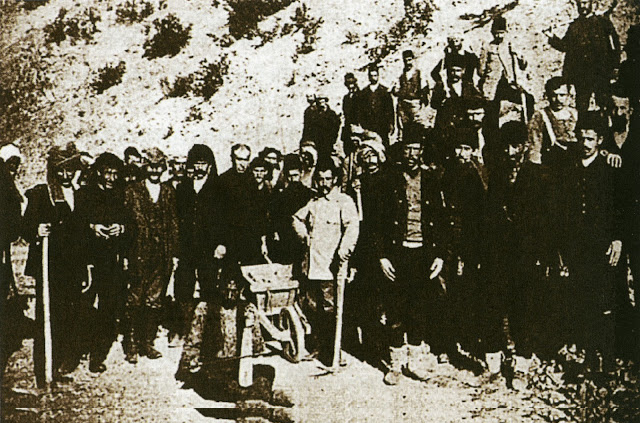
Enslaved men in a Turkish labour battalion.

During the course of World War I and the Turkish War of Independence, Turkish authorities enslaved over 500,000 Armenians and Greeks—primarily men, but also women and children—into labour battalions, as part of the Armenian genocide and the Greek genocide.

Enslaved people forced into labour battalions often died quickly and under crippling conditions in quarries, mines, and roads, or were killed by their Turkish guards. In 1921, Turkish authorities made false birth certificates declaring Greek orphans to be older than they actually were. In this way, children were also conscripted into labour battalions. In 1922, Herbert Adams Gibbons relayed a report by the Near East Relief to the U.S. Secretary of State Charles Evans Hughes, which warned that the Greeks were in a condition "worse than slavery", while Mark Lambert Bristol reported that the Greek men in labour battalions were "treated like animals."

The brutal conditions in these battalions resulted in a very high death rate among victims, reaching from 80% to as high as 99%.

==== Nazi Germany ====
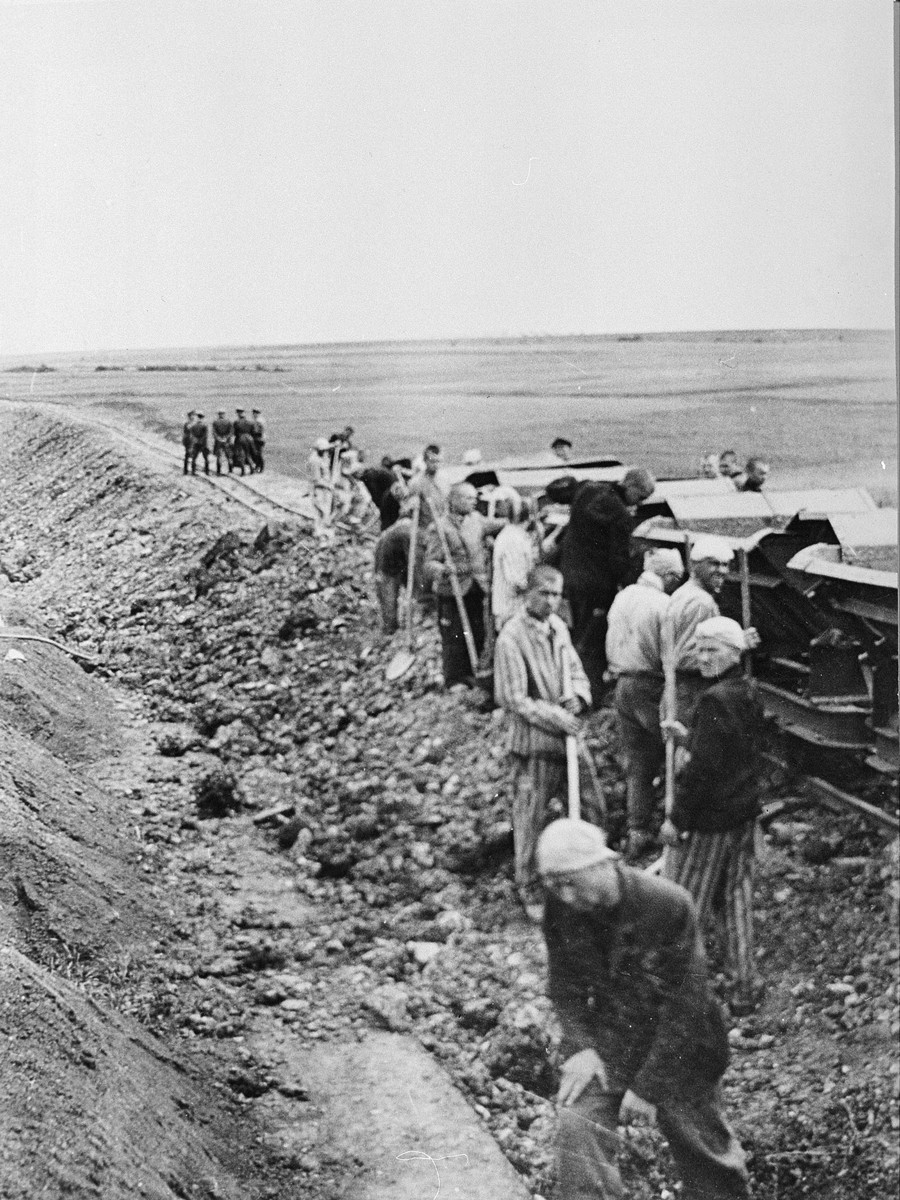
Prisoners forced to work on the Buchenwald–Weimar rail line, 1943

During the Second World War, Nazi Germany effectively enslaved about 12 million people, both those considered undesirable and citizens of conquered countries, with the avowed intention of treating these Untermenschen (sub-humans) as a permanent slave-class of inferior beings who could be worked until they died, and who possessed neither the rights nor the legal status of members of the Aryan race.

Besides Jews, the harshest deportation and forced labour policies were applied to the populations of Poland, Belarus, Ukraine, and Russia. By the end of the war, half of Belarus' population had been killed or deported.

==== Communist states ====
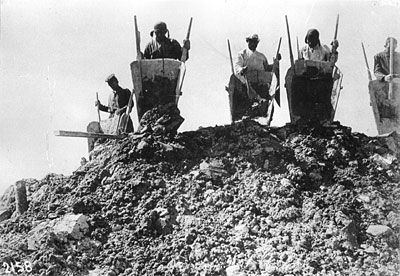
Workers being forced to haul rocks up a hill in a Gulag

Between 1930 and 1960, the Soviet Union created a system of, according to Anne Applebaum and the "perspective of the Kremlin", slave labor camps called the Gulag (Russian: ГУЛаг, romanized: GULag).

Prisoners in these camps were worked to death by a combination of extreme production quotas, physical and psychological brutality, hunger, lack of medical care, and the harsh environment. Aleksandr Solzhenitsyn, who survived eight years of Gulag incarceration, provided firsthand testimony about the camps with the publication of The Gulag Archipelago, after which he was awarded the Nobel Prize in Literature. Fatality rate was as high as 80% during the first months in many camps. Hundreds of thousands of people, possibly millions, died as a direct result of forced labour under the Soviets.

Golfo Alexopoulos suggests comparing labor in the Gulag with "other forms of slave labor" and notes its "violence of human exploitation" in Illness and Inhumanity in Stalin's Gulag. Similarly, Historian Anne Applebaum writes in the introduction of her book that the word GULAG has come to represent "the system of Soviet slave labor itself, in all its forms and varieties": Applebaum's introduction has been criticized by Gulag researcher Wilson Bell, stating that her book "is, aside from the introduction, a well-done overview of the Gulag, but it did not offer an interpretative framework much beyond Solzhenitsyn's paradigms".

== Contemporary slavery ==
Modern incidence of slavery, as a percentage of the population, by country (2024)

Even though slavery is now outlawed in every country, the number of slaves in 2013 was estimated to be between 12 million and 29.8 million. According to a broad definition of slavery, there were 27 million people in slavery in 1999, spread all over the world. In 2005, the International Labour Organization provided an estimate of 12.3 million forced labourers. Siddharth Kara has also provided an estimate of 28.4 million slaves at the end of 2006 divided into three categories: bonded labour/debt bondage (18.1 million), forced labour (7.6 million), and trafficked slaves (2.7 million). Kara provides a dynamic model to calculate the number of slaves in the world each year, with an estimated 29.2 million at the end of 2009.

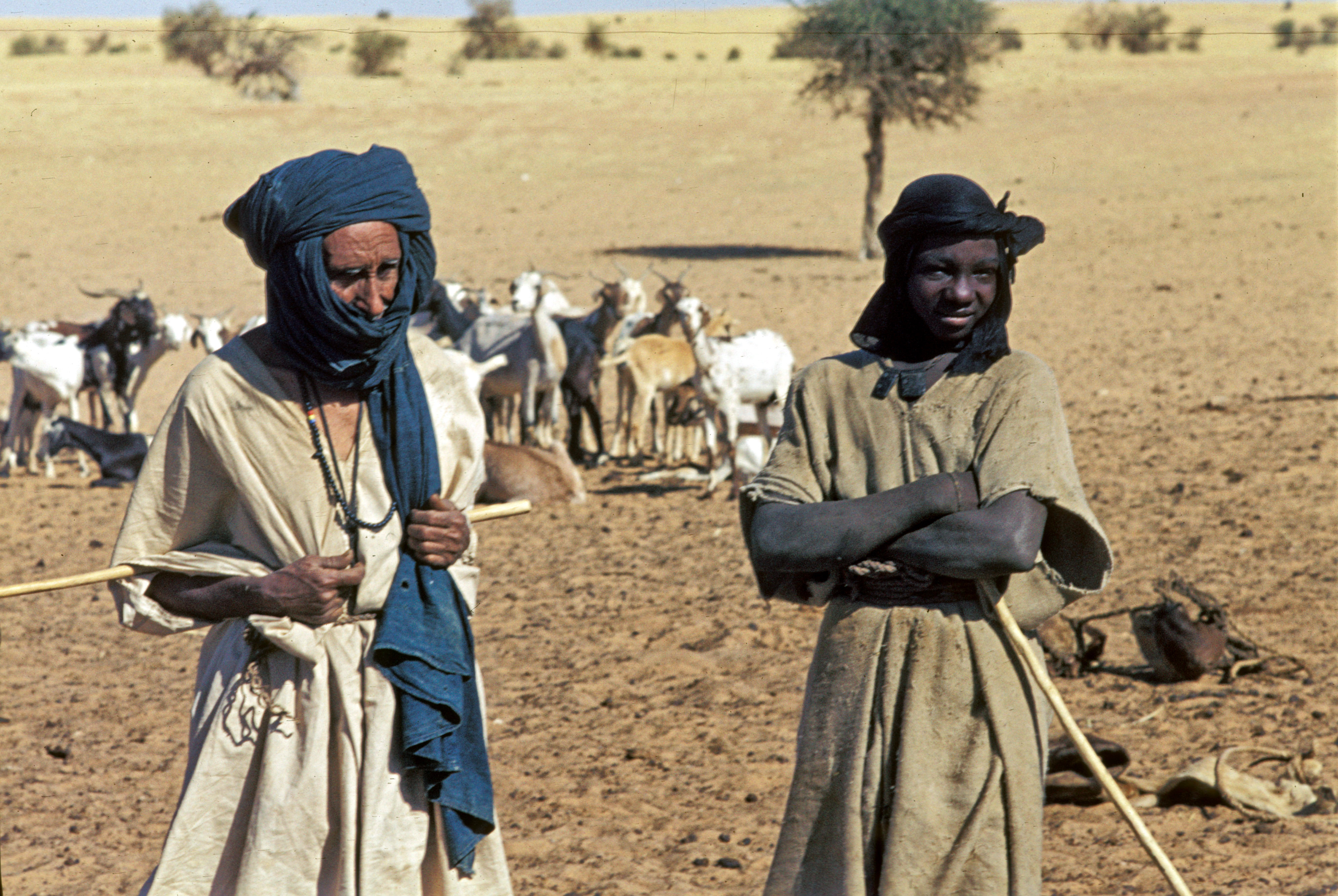
Tuareg society is traditionally hierarchical, ranging from nobles, through vassals, to dark-skinned slaves.

According to a 2003 report by Human Rights Watch, an estimated 15 million children in debt bondage in India work in slavery-like conditions to pay off their family's debts.

Slavoj Žižek asserts that new forms of contemporary slavery have been created in the post-Cold War era of global capitalism, including migrant workers deprived of basic civil rights on the Arabian Peninsula, the total control of workers in Asian sweatshops and the use of forced labor in the exploitation of natural resources in Central Africa.

=== Distribution ===
In June 2013, U.S. State Department released a report on slavery. It placed Russia, China, and Uzbekistan in the worst offenders category. Cuba, Iran, North Korea, Sudan, Syria, and Zimbabwe were at the lowest level. The list also included Algeria, Libya, Saudi Arabia and Kuwait among a total of 21 countries.

In Kuwait, there are more than 600,000 migrant domestic workers who are vulnerable to forced labor and legally tied to their employers, who often illegally take their passports. In 2019, online slave markets on apps such as Instagram were uncovered.

In the preparations for the 2022 World Cup in Qatar, thousands of Nepalese, the largest group of labourers, faced slavery in the form of denial of wages, confiscation of documents, and inability to leave the workplace. In 2016, the United Nations gave Qatar 12 months to end migrant worker slavery or face investigation.

The Walk Free Foundation reported in 2018 that slavery in wealthy Western societies is much more prevalent than previously known, in particular the United States and Great Britain, which have 403,000 (one in 800) and 136,000 slaves respectively. Andrew Forrest, founder of the organization, said that "The United States is one of the most advanced countries in the world yet has more than 400,000 modern slaves working under forced labour conditions." An estimated 40.3 million are enslaved globally, with North Korea having the most slaves at 2.6 million (one in 10). Of the estimated 40.3 million people in contemporary slavery, 71% are women and 29% are men. The report found of the 40.3 million in modern slavery, 15.4 million are in forced marriages and 24.9 million are in forced labor. The foundation defines contemporary slavery as "situations of exploitation that a person cannot refuse or leave because of threats, violence, coercion, abuse of power, or deception."

==== China ====
In March 2020, the Chinese government was found to be using the Uyghur minority for forced labour, inside sweat shops. According to a report published then by the Australian Strategic Policy Institute (ASPI), no fewer than around 80,000 Uyghurs were forcibly removed from the region of Xinjiang and used for forced labour in at least twenty-seven corporate factories. According to the Business and Human Rights resource center, corporations such as Abercrombie & Fitch, Adidas, Amazon, Apple, BMW, Fila, Gap, H&M, Inditex, Marks & Spencer, Nike, North Face, Puma, PVH, Samsung, and UNIQLO have each sourced products from these factories prior to the publication of the ASPI report.

==== Libya ====
During the Second Libyan Civil War, Libyans started capturing Sub-Saharan African migrants trying to get to Europe through Libya and selling them on slave markets or holding them hostage for ransom Women are often raped, used as sex slaves, or sold to brothels. Child migrants suffer from abuse and child rape in Libya.

==== Mauritania ====
Mauritania was the last country to abolish slavery (in 1981), and it is estimated that 20% of its population of 3 million people are enslaved as bonded labourers, with black Haratin being slaves and Berbers and Arabs the owners. Slavery in Mauritania was criminalized in August 2007. However, although slavery, as a practice, was legally banned in 1981, it was not a crime to own a slave until 2007. Although many slaves have escaped or have been freed since 2007, as of 2012, only one slave owner had been sentenced to serve time in prison.

==== North Korea ====
North Korea's human rights record is often considered to be the worst in the world and has been globally condemned, with the United Nations, the European Union and groups such as Human Rights Watch all critical of the country's record. Furthermore, North Korea has the highest estimated prevalence of modern slavery in the world. . As of 2021, a Global Slavery Index 2023 report estimates that about one-in-ten people live in modern slavery conditions. Forms of torture, forced labour, and abuses are all widespread. Most international human rights organizations consider North Korea to have no contemporary parallel with respect to violations of liberty.

==== Taiwan ====
Taiwan's migrant worker population—estimated in 2018 to be up to 660,000 in number—have reportedly faced slavery-like conditions involving sexual abuse in the domestic work sector and forced labor in fishing sectors. Taiwan is among a minority of places in the world that legally allows labor brokers to charge migrant workers for services which elsewhere are covered by employers as human resource costs. A few Taiwanese universities have reportedly tricked students from Eswatini, Uganda and Sri Lanka into forced labour at factories as payment for the university programs. Some charity groups in 2007 also insisted that foreign women—mostly from China and Southeast Asia—were being forced into prostitution, although local police in Tainan disagreed and said they deliberately came to Taiwan "to sell sex".

==== Yemen ====
Despite being formally abolished in the 1960s, slavery in Yemen remains a significant issue exacerbated by ongoing conflict and socio-economic instability. An estimated 85,000 people remaining enslaved as of 2022. The Iran-backed Houthi militias have been accused of reinstating traditional slavery systems. Reports indicate that over 1,800 Yemenis have been forced into servitude by prominent Houthi leaders, with the Houthis dividing society into hierarchical classes of masters and slaves. This modern slavery encompasses various forms, such as forced labor, sexual exploitation, human trafficking, and child recruitment. Vulnerable populations include the Al Muhamashīn community, Ethiopian migrants, and children who are subjected to severe discrimination and exploitation. Despite legal prohibitions against slavery in Yemen, enforcement is weak due to political instability and ongoing civil war. International organizations have documented these abuses, highlighting the need for stronger interventions to combat slavery and human trafficking in the region.

=== Economics ===
While American slaves in the Antebellum South were sold for around $40,000 (in inflation adjusted dollars), a slave nowadays can be bought for just $90, making replacement more economical than providing long-term care. Slavery is a multibillion-dollar industry with estimates of up to $35 billion generated annually.

=== Trafficking ===
Victims of human trafficking are typically recruited through deceit or trickery (such as a false job offer, false migration offer, or false marriage offer), sale by family members, recruitment by former slaves, or outright abduction. Victims are forced into a "debt slavery" situation by coercion, deception, fraud, intimidation, isolation, threat, physical force, debt bondage or even force-feeding with drugs to control their victims. "Annually, according to U.S. government-sponsored research completed in 2006, approximately 800,000 people are trafficked across national borders, which does not include millions trafficked within their own countries. Approximately 80% of transnational victims are women and girls, and up to 50% are minors, reports the U.S. State Department in a 2008 study.

While the majority of trafficking victims are women who are forced into prostitution (in which case the practice is called sex trafficking), victims also include men, women and children who are forced into manual labour. Because of the illegal nature of human trafficking, its extent is unknown. A U.S. government report, published in 2005, estimates that about 700,000 people worldwide are trafficked across borders each year. This figure does not include those who are trafficked internally. Another research effort revealed that roughly 1.5 million individuals are trafficked either internally or internationally each year, of which about 500,000 are sex trafficking victims.

== Abolitionism ==
A painting of the 1840 World Anti-Slavery Convention at Exeter Hall in London

Slavery has existed, in one form or another, throughout recorded human history – as have, in various periods, movements to free large or distinct groups of slaves.

=== In antiquity ===
Emperor Ashoka, who ruled the Maurya Empire in the Indian subcontinent from 269 to 232 BCE, abolished the slave trade but not slavery. The Qin dynasty, which ruled China from 221 to 206 BCE, abolished slavery and discouraged serfdom. However, many of its laws were overturned when the dynasty was overthrown. Slavery was again abolished by Wang Mang in China in 17 CE but was reinstituted after his assassination.

=== Americas ===
The Spanish colonization of the Americas sparked a discussion about the right to enslave Native Americans. A prominent critic of slavery in the Spanish New World colonies was the Spanish missionary and bishop, Bartolomé de las Casas, who was the first to document the European maltreatment of and cruelty towards American natives.

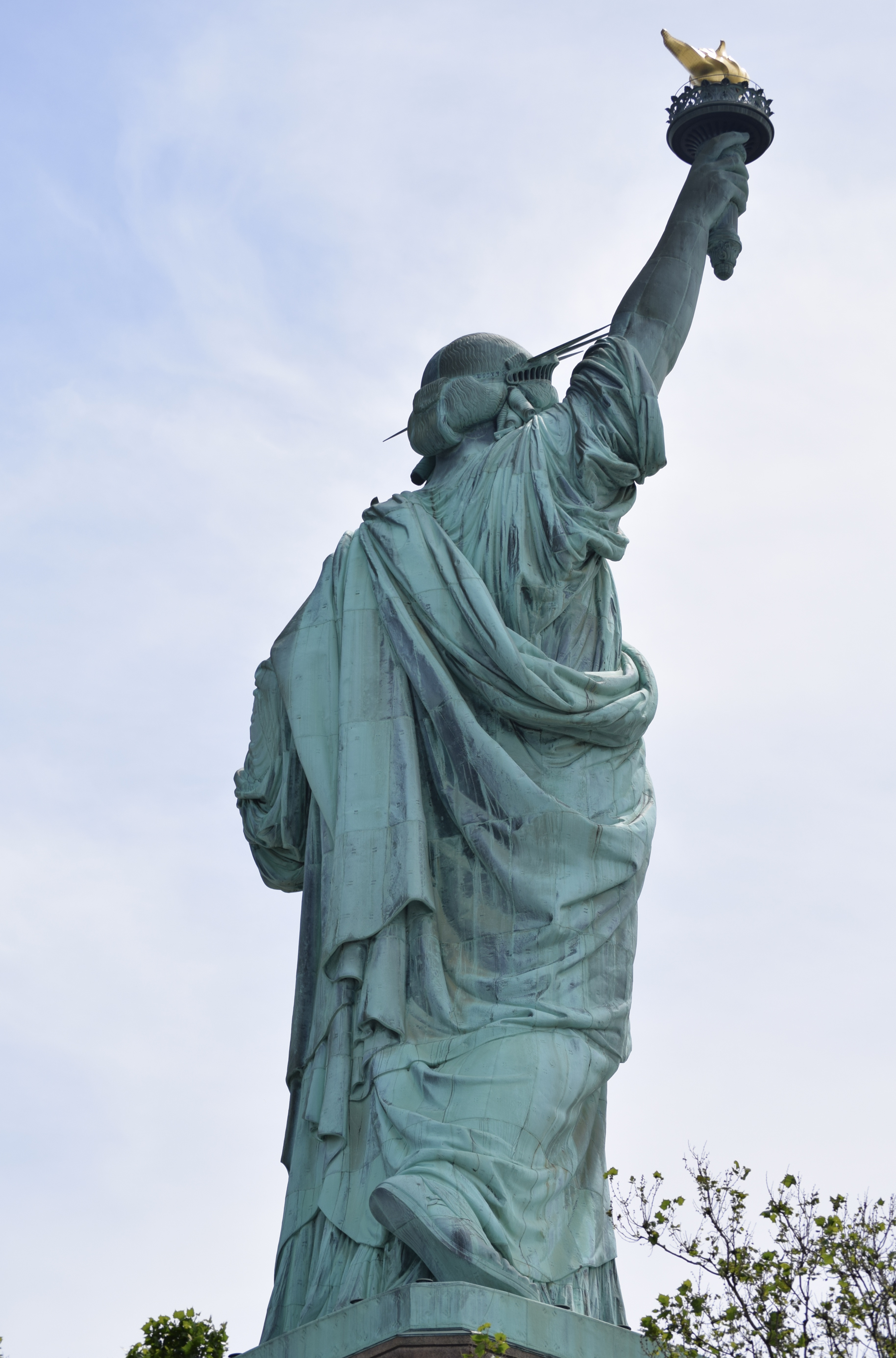
The Statue of Liberty was conceived by French abolitionist Édouard René de Laboulaye to commemorate the end of slavery in the US. The initial design saw her hold a broken chain in her left hand, but American financiers were opposed to the statue acknowledging slavery; the sculptor Bartholdi retained the chains at her feet (pictured) which are barely visible.

In the United States, all of the northern states had abolished slavery by 1804, with New Jersey being the last to act. Abolitionist pressure produced a series of small steps towards emancipation. After the Act Prohibiting Importation of Slaves went into effect on January 1, 1808, the importation of slaves into the United States was prohibited, but not the internal slave trade, nor involvement in the international slave trade externally. Legal slavery persisted outside the northern states, but abolitionists took an active role in opposing slavery by supporting the Underground Railroad, and violent clashes between anti-slavery and pro-slavery Americans occurred, including in Bleeding Kansas, a series of political and armed disputes in 1854–1858 as to whether Kansas would join the United States as a slave or free state. By 1860, the total number of slaves reached almost four million, and the American Civil War, beginning in 1861, led to the end of slavery in the United States. Slaves in areas controlled by the Confederacy were legally emancipated in 1863, when Lincoln issued the Emancipation Proclamation, and slavery was banned nationwide, except as punishment for a crime, in 1865, with the ratification of the 13th Amendment to the U.S. Constitution.

Many of the freed slaves became sharecroppers and indentured servants. In this manner, some became tied to the very parcel of land into which they had been born a slave having little freedom or economic opportunity because of Jim Crow laws which perpetuated discrimination, limited education, promoted persecution without due process and resulted in continued poverty. Fear of reprisals such as unjust incarcerations and lynchings deterred upward mobility further.

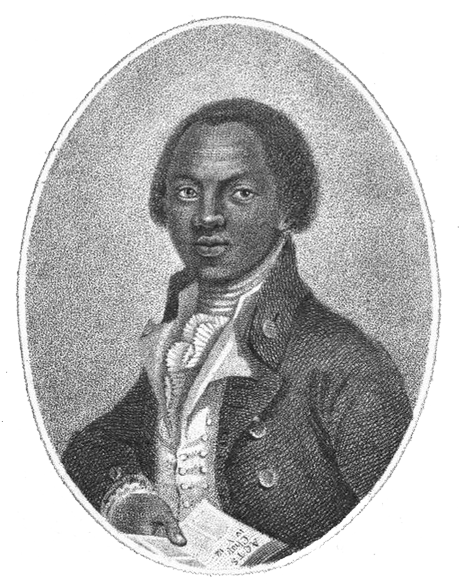
Olaudah Equiano. His autobiography, published in 1789, helped in the creation of the Slave Trade Act 1807 which ended the African slave trade for Britain and its colonies.

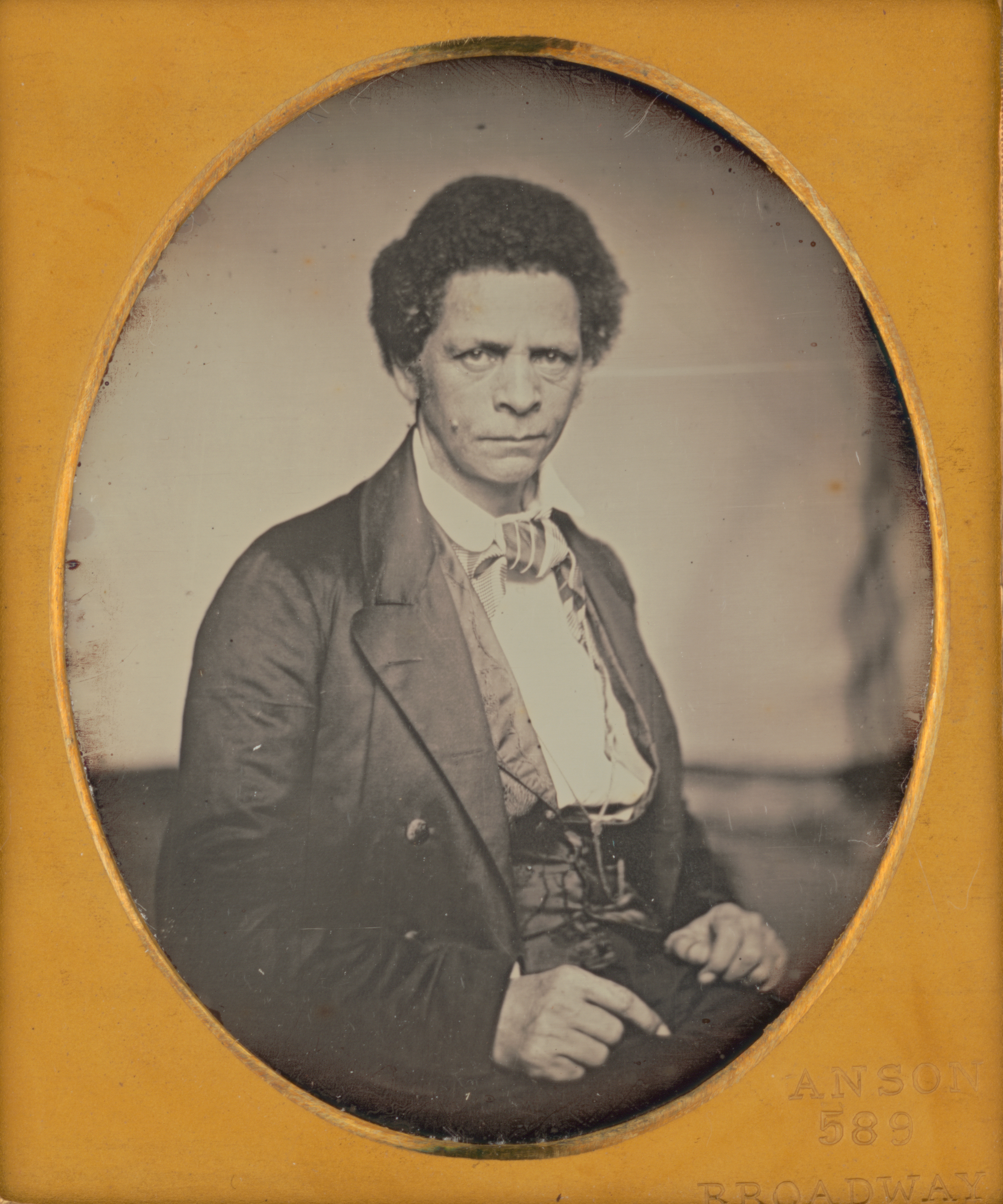
Joseph Jenkins Roberts, born in Virginia, was the first president of Liberia, which was founded in 1822 for freed American slaves.

=== Europe ===
France abolished slavery in 1794 during the Revolution, but it was restored in 1802 under Napoleon. It has been asserted that, before the Revolution, slavery was illegal in metropolitan France (as opposed to its colonies), but this has been refuted.

One of the most significant milestones in the campaign to abolish slavery throughout the world occurred in England in 1772, with British Judge Lord Mansfield, whose opinion in Somersett's Case was widely taken to have held that slavery was illegal in England. This judgement also laid down the principle that slavery contracted in other jurisdictions could not be enforced in England. The last person to be deemed a slave in a British court was Bell (Belinda) who was transported to the Americas in 1772 as a "slave for life" by a Perth court.

Sons of Africa was a late 18th-century British group that campaigned to end slavery. Its members were Africans in London, freed slaves who included Ottobah Cugoano, Olaudah Equiano and other leading members of London's black community. It was closely connected to the Society for Effecting the Abolition of the Slave Trade, a non-denominational group founded in 1787, whose members included Thomas Clarkson. British Member of Parliament William Wilberforce led the anti-slavery movement in the United Kingdom, although the groundwork was an anti-slavery essay by Clarkson. Wilberforce was urged by his close friend, Prime Minister William Pitt the Younger, to make the issue his own and was also given support by reformed Evangelical John Newton. The Slave Trade Act was passed by the British Parliament on March 25, 1807, making the slave trade illegal throughout the British Empire, Wilberforce also campaigned for abolition of slavery in the British Empire, which he lived to see in the Slavery Abolition Act 1833.

After the 1807 act abolishing the slave trade was passed, these campaigners switched to encouraging other countries to follow suit, notably France and the British colonies. Between 1808 and 1860, the British West Africa Squadron seized approximately 1,600 slave ships and freed 150,000 Africans who were aboard. Action was also taken against African leaders who refused to agree to British treaties to outlaw the trade, for example against "the usurping King of Lagos", deposed in 1851. Anti-slavery treaties were signed with over 50 African rulers.

=== Worldwide ===
In 1839, the world's oldest international human rights organization, Anti-Slavery International, was formed in Britain by Joseph Sturge, which campaigned to outlaw slavery in other countries. There were celebrations in 2007 to commemorate the 200th anniversary of the abolition of the slave trade in the United Kingdom through the work of the British Anti-Slavery Society.

In the 1860s, David Livingstone's reports of atrocities within the Arab slave trade in Africa stirred up the interest of the British public, reviving the flagging abolitionist movement. The Royal Navy throughout the 1870s attempted to suppress "this abominable Eastern trade", at Zanzibar in particular. In 1905, the French abolished indigenous slavery in most of French West Africa.

On December 10, 1948, the United Nations General Assembly adopted the Universal Declaration of Human Rights, which declared freedom from slavery is an internationally recognized human right. Article 4 of the Universal Declaration of Human Rights states:

No one shall be held in slavery or servitude; slavery and the slave trade shall be prohibited in all their forms.

In 2014, for the first time in history, major leaders of many religions, Buddhist, Hindu, Christian, Jewish, and Muslim met to sign a shared commitment against modern-day slavery; the declaration they signed calls for the elimination of slavery and human trafficking by 2020. The signatories were: Pope Francis, Mātā Amṛtānandamayī, Bhikkhuni Thich Nu Chân Không (representing Zen Master Thích Nhất Hạnh), Datuk K Sri Dhammaratana, Chief High Priest of Malaysia, Rabbi Abraham Skorka, Rabbi David Rosen, Abbas Abdalla Abbas Soliman, Undersecretary of State of Al Azhar Alsharif (representing Mohamed Ahmed El-Tayeb, Grand Imam of Al-Azhar), Grand Ayatollah Mohammad Taqi al-Modarresi, Sheikh Naziyah Razzaq Jaafar, Special advisor of Grand Ayatollah (representing Grand Ayatollah Sheikh Basheer Hussain al Najafi), Sheikh Omar Abboud, Justin Welby, Archbishop of Canterbury, and Metropolitan Emmanuel of France (representing Ecumenical Patriarch Bartholomew.)

Groups such as the American Anti-Slavery Group, Anti-Slavery International, Free the Slaves, the Anti-Slavery Society, and the Norwegian Anti-Slavery Society continue to campaign to eliminate slavery.

UNESCO has been working to break the silence surrounding the memory of slavery since 1994, through The Slave Route Project.

== Apologies ==
On May 21, 2001, the National Assembly of France passed the Taubira law, recognizing slavery as a crime against humanity. Apologies on behalf of African nations, for their role in trading their countrymen into slavery, remain an open issue since slavery was practiced in Africa even before the first Europeans arrived and the Atlantic slave trade was performed with a high degree of involvement of several African societies. The black slave market was supplied by well-established slave trade networks controlled by local African societies and individuals.

There is adequate evidence citing case after case of African control of segments of the trade. Several African nations such as the Calabar and other southern parts of Nigeria had economies depended solely on the trade. African peoples such as the Imbangala of Angola and the Nyamwezi of Tanzania would serve as middlemen or roving bands warring with other African nations to capture Africans for Europeans.

Several historians have made important contributions to the global understanding of the African side of the Atlantic slave trade. By arguing that African merchants determined the assemblage of trade goods accepted in exchange for slaves, many historians argue for African agency and ultimately a shared responsibility for the slave trade.

In 1999, President Mathieu Kérékou of Benin issued a national apology for the central role Africans played in the Atlantic slave trade. Luc Gnacadja, minister of environment and housing for Benin, later said: "The slave trade is a shame, and we do repent for it." Researchers estimate that 3 million slaves were exported out of the Slave Coast bordering the Bight of Benin. President Jerry Rawlings of Ghana also apologized for his country's involvement in the slave trade.

The issue of an apology is linked to reparations for slavery and is still being pursued by entities across the world. For example, the Jamaican Reparations Movement approved its declaration and action plan. In 2007, British Prime Minister Tony Blair made a formal apology for Great Britain's involvement in slavery.

On February 25, 2007, the Commonwealth of Virginia resolved to 'profoundly regret' and apologize for its role in the institution of slavery. Unique and the first of its kind in the U.S., the apology was unanimously passed in both Houses as Virginia approached the 400th anniversary of the founding of Jamestown.

On August 24, 2007, Mayor of London Ken Livingstone issued a public apology for London's role in Atlantic slave trade, which took place at an event commemorating the 200th anniversary of the British slave trade's abolition. In his speech, Livingstone described the slave trade as "the racial murder of not just those who were transported but generations of enslaved African men, women and children. To justify this murder and torture black people had to be declared inferior or not human... We live with the consequences today." City officials in Liverpool, which was a large slave trading port, apologized in 1999.

On July 30, 2008, the United States House of Representatives passed a resolution apologizing for American slavery and subsequent discriminatory laws. In June 2009, the U.S. Senate passed a resolution apologizing to African-Americans for the "fundamental injustice, cruelty, brutality, and inhumanity of slavery". The news was welcomed by President Barack Obama, the nation's first president of African descent. Some of President Obama's ancestors may have been slave owners.

In 2010, Libyan leader Muammar Gaddafi apologized for Arab involvement in the slave trade, saying: "I regret the behavior of the Arabs... They brought African children to North Africa, they made them slaves, they sold them like animals, and they took them as slaves and traded them in a shameful way."

=== Reparations ===
There have been movements to achieve reparations for those formerly held as slaves or for their descendants. Claims for reparations for being held in slavery are handled as a civil law matter in almost every country. This is often decried as a serious problem, since former slaves' relatives lack of money means they often have limited access to a potentially expensive and futile legal process. Mandatory systems of fines and reparations paid to an as yet undetermined group of claimants from fines, paid by unspecified parties, and collected by authorities have been proposed by advocates to alleviate this "civil court problem." Since in almost all cases there are no living ex-slaves or living ex-slave owners these movements have gained little traction. In nearly all cases the judicial system has ruled that the statute of limitations on these possible claims has long since expired.

In June 2023, The Brattle Group presented a report at an event at the University of the West Indies in which reparations were estimated, for harms both during and after the period of transatlantic chattel slavery, at over 100 trillion dollars.

== Media ==
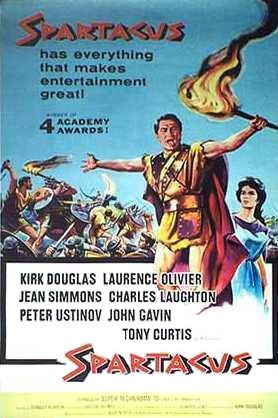
Poster for Spartacus

Film has been the most influential medium in the presentation of the history of slavery to the general public around the world. The American film industry has had a complex relationship with slavery and until recent decades often avoided the topic. Films such as The Birth of a Nation (1915) and Gone with the Wind (1939) became controversial because they gave a favourable depiction. In 1940 The Santa Fe Trail gave a liberal but ambiguous interpretation of John Brown's attacks on slavery.

The Civil Rights Movement in the 1950s made defiant slaves into heroes. The question of slavery in American memory necessarily involves its depictions in feature films.

Most Hollywood films used American settings, although Spartacus (1960), dealt with an actual revolt in the Roman Empire known as the Third Servile War. The revolt failed, and all the rebels were executed, but their spirit lived on according to the film. Spartacus stays surprisingly close to the historical record.

The Last Supper (La última cena in Spanish) was a 1976 film directed by Cuban Tomás Gutiérrez Alea about the teaching of Christianity to slaves in Cuba, and emphasizes the role of ritual and revolt. Burn! takes place on the imaginary Portuguese island of Queimada (where the locals speak Spanish) and it merges historical events that took place in Brazil, Cuba, Santo Domingo, Jamaica, and elsewhere.

Historians agree that films have largely shaped historical memories, but they debate issues of accuracy, plausibility, moralism, sensationalism, how facts are stretched in search of broader truths, and suitability for the classroom. Ira Berlin argues that critics complain if the treatment emphasizes historical brutality, or if it glosses over the harshness to highlight the emotional impact of slavery.

== See also ==
- Bodmin manumissions, the names and details of slaves freed in Medieval Bodmin
- International Day for the Abolition of Slavery
- International Slavery Museum
- Involuntary servitude
- List of slaves
- List of slave owners
- Mukataba
- Slave rebellion
- Slavery in the 21st century
- Slave-owning slaves
- Supplementary Convention on the Abolition of Slavery
- Wilberforce Institute for the Study of Slavery and Emancipation
- Decree of the Abolition of Slavery of April 27, 1848
