= Slavery in the Abbasid Caliphate =

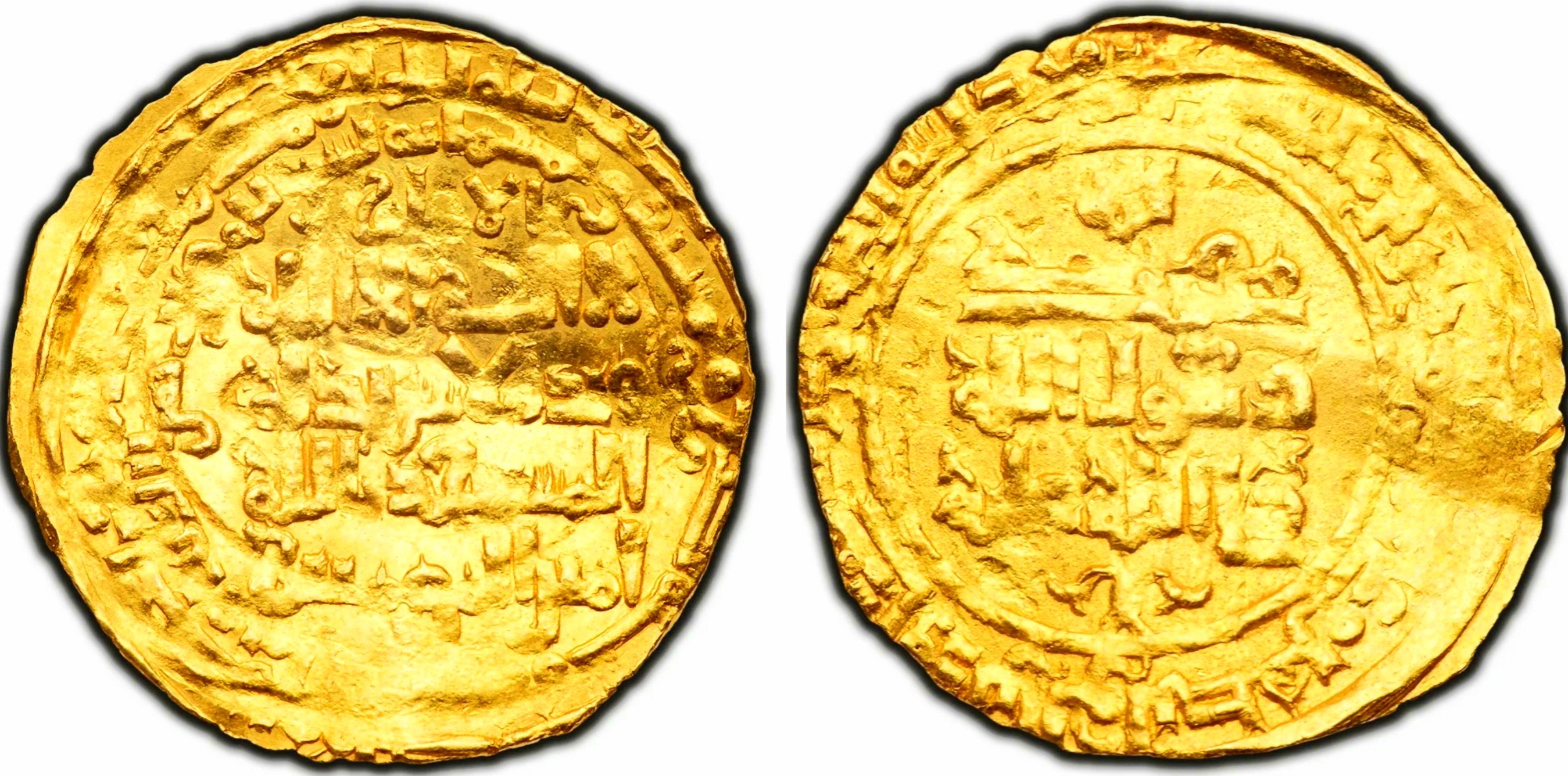
Dinar of Abbasid caliph al-Mustanjid 557 AH

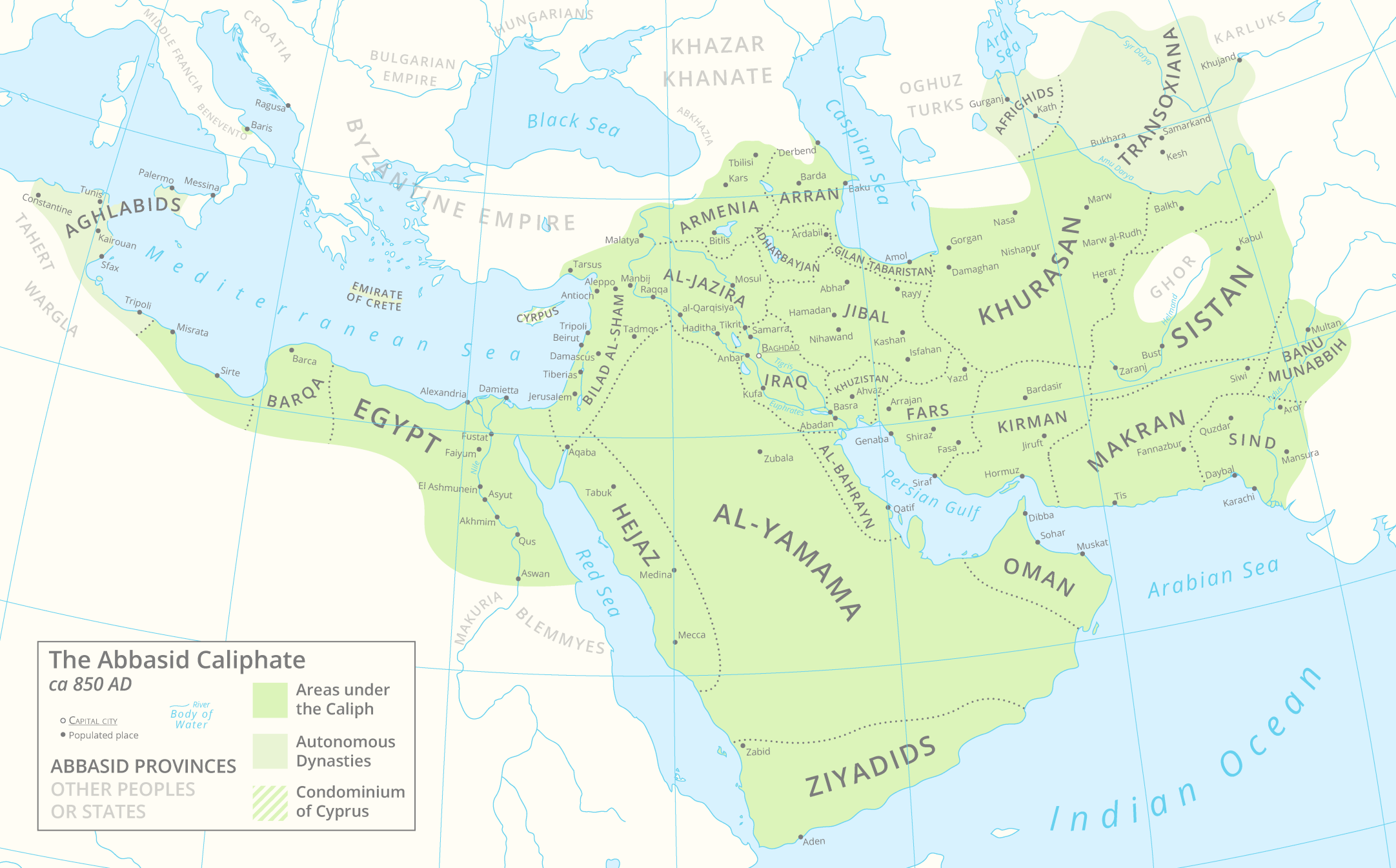
Abbasid Caliphate 850 AD

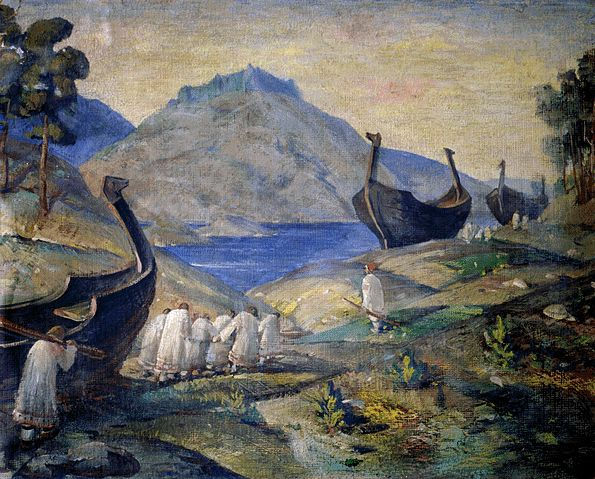
Volok by Roerich

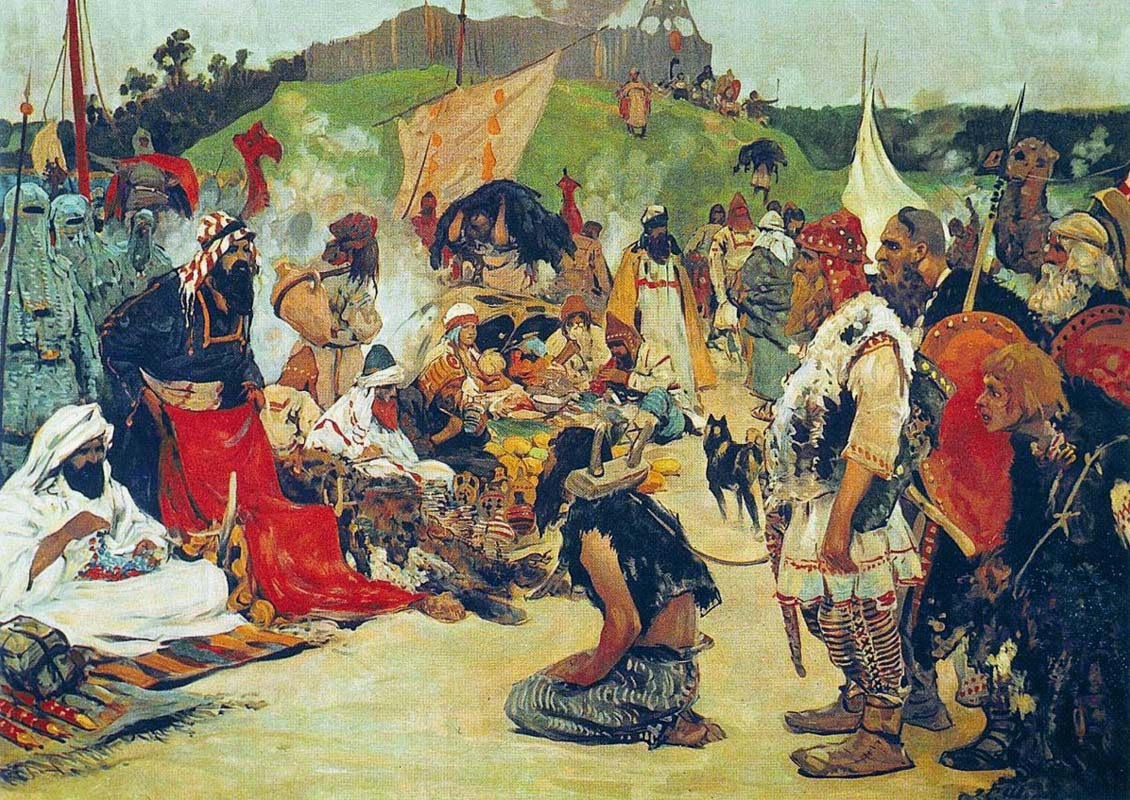
S. V. Ivanov. Trade negotiations in the country of Eastern Slavs. Pictures of Russian history. (1909)

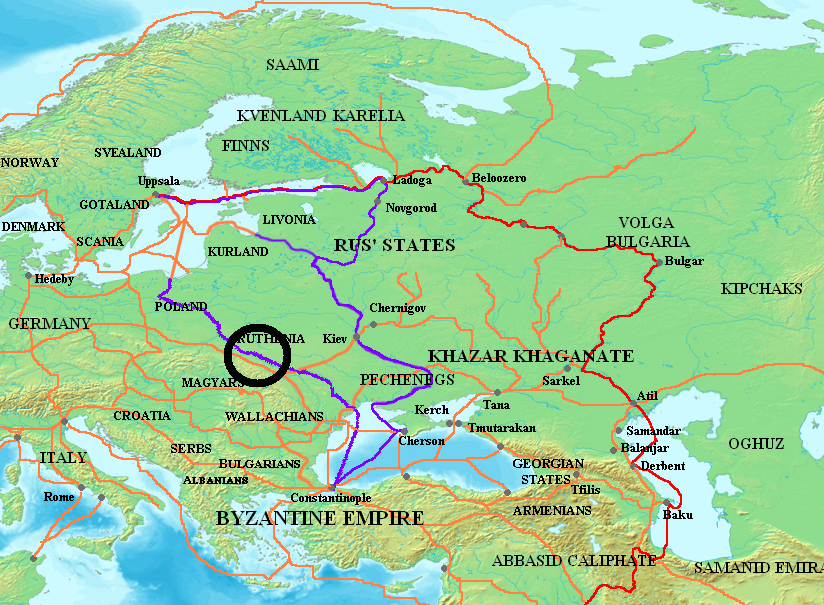
Black Sea area trade routes in the 8th-11th centuries. The Volga trade route is in red.

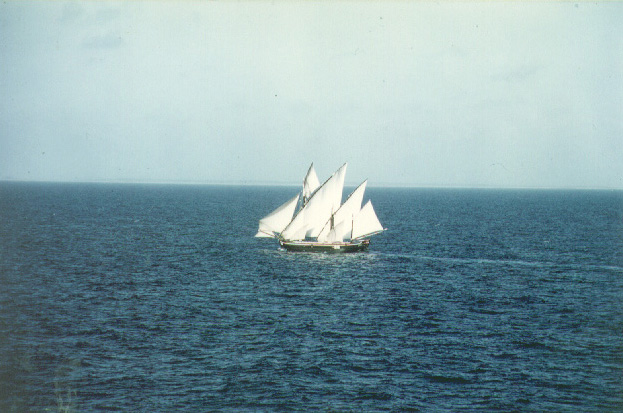
Dhows were used to transport goods and slaves.

Zanj Rebellion.

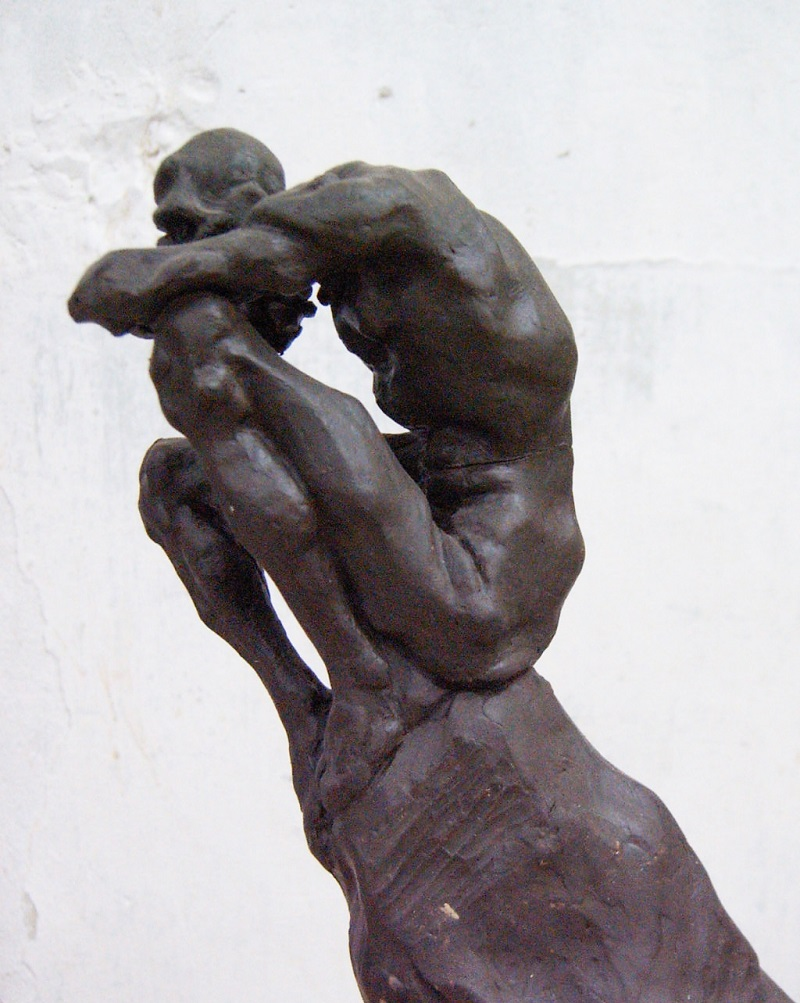
Zanj Rebellion – Thawrat al-Zanj – by Ahmad Barakizadeh

Slavery was a major part of society, culture and economy in the Abbasid Caliphate (750–1258) of the Islamic Golden Age, which during its history included most of the Middle East. While chattel slavery was an important part also of the preceding practice of slavery in the Umayyad Caliphate (661–750), it was during the Abbasid Caliphate that the slave trade to the Muslim world reached a more permanent commercial industrial scale, establishing commercial slave trade routes that were to remain for centuries.

The Caliphate was a major slave trade destination, and slaves were imported from several destinations. Since Islamic law prohibited enslavement of Muslims, non-Muslim slaves (kafir) were imported from non-Muslim lands (Dar al-harb) around the Muslim world (Dar al-Islam). These included pagan Africa in the south; Christian and pagan Europe in the north; and pagan Central Asia and India in the east.

These slaves came from the north along the Balkan slave trade and the Volga trade route; from the east via the Bukhara slave trade; from the west via the Andalusian slave trade, the Trans-Saharan slave trade and the Red Sea slave trade; and from the south from the Indian Ocean slave trade. The slave trade and slavery in the area continued during subsequent states, such as the slavery in the Mamluk Sultanate (1258–1517) and the slavery in the Ottoman Empire (1517–1922), until slavery was ended in the 20th century, when the national states emerging after the split of the Ottoman Empire gradually ended slavery, culminating in the abolition of slavery in Saudi Arabia, slavery in Yemen and slavery in Oman in 1962–1970.

== Slave trade ==
The slave trade was substantial during the Umayyad Caliphate, mainly fueled by war captives and people enslaved as tax levy; during the Abbasid Caliphate, the slave trade in war captives was largely supplanted by people bought through the commercial slave trade, and provided for the slave markets in Basra, Baghdad and Samarra. In parallel with the slave trade in captives and the slaves provided as tax levy and tributes, the expansion of the commercial slave trade expanded slavery during the Abbasid period.

=== War captives ===
The established custom to enslave captured warriors as well as civilians during warfare continued during the Abbasid Caliphate, in accordance with the principle that the kafir of dar al-Harb was legitimate to enslave, though during the Abbasid era, ransoming prisoners (at least prisoners of rank) did become more common than it had been during the Rashidun and Umayyad eras, as illustrated by the Arab–Byzantine prisoner exchanges.

The historical legal principles governing the treatment of prisoners of war, in shar'iah, Islamic law, (in the traditional madhabs schools of Islamic jurisprudence), was then a significant improvement over the pre-existing norms of Arab society during Muhammad's time (see Early reforms under Islam). Men, women, and children may all be taken as prisoners of war under traditional interpretations of Islamic law. Generally, a prisoner of war could be, at the discretion of the military leader, freed, ransomed, exchanged for Muslim prisoners, or kept in bondage.

==== Byzantine Asia Minor ====
The Abbasid Caliphate made many incursions to the interior of Asia Minor, besieging strategic Byzantine cities in order to weaken Byzantine geographical defense; when this warfare resulted in a city being captured by the Caliphate, it resulted in the city being sacked and its inhabitants being captured and then sold as slaves, a known case being that of the siege and capture of Heraclea Cybistra during the Abbasid invasion of Asia Minor (806).

The Abbasid caliph, Harun al-Rashid (r. 786–809), who sought to promote himself as a champion of jihad, decided to lead in person a retaliatory attack with the objective of punishing the Byzantines and impressing Abbasid influence upon their emperor. Harun, with the other half of his forces, went west and captured the strongly fortified city of Herakleia after a month-long siege in August or September. The city was plundered and razed, and its inhabitants enslaved and deported to slavery in the Abbasid Caliphate. The fall of Herakleia was considered by the Arab chroniclers the most significant achievement of Harun's expeditions against the Byzantines, and is the central event in the narratives of Harun's retaliatory campaign against Nikephoros.

During the Sack of Amorium in 838, the city was systematically destroyed, never to recover its former prosperity. Many of its inhabitants were slaughtered, and the remainder driven off as slaves. The city was thoroughly sacked and plundered; according to the Arab accounts, the sale of the spoils went on for five days. The Byzantine chronicler Theophanes Continuatus mentions 70,000 dead, while the Arab al-Mas'udi records 30,000. The surviving population were divided as slaves among the army leaders, except for the city's military and civic leaders, who were reserved for the caliph's disposal. After allowing Theophilos's envoys to return to him with the news of Amorium's fall, Mu'tasim burned the city to the ground, with only the city walls surviving relatively intact. Many of the survivors were released after a truce in 841, but prominent officials were taken to the caliph's capital of Samarra and executed years later after refusing to convert to Islam, becoming known as the 42 Martyrs of Amorium.

=== Tributary slaves ===
==== Baqt ====
The Christian kingdom of Makuria in Dongola Reach (in today's Sudan) was obliged to provide between 360 and 400 slaves every year to Islamic Egypt (then an Abbasid province) in accordance with the terms of the Baqt treaty.

=== African slave trade ===
In the Abbasid Empire, African slaves were referred to as Zanj. African slaves were favored for hard labor.

==== Red Sea slave trade ====
The slave trade from Africa to Arabia via the Red Sea had ancient roots. While in pre-Islamic Arabia, Arab war captives were common targets of slavery, importation of slaves from Ethiopia across the Red Sea also took place. The Red Sea slave trade appears to have been established at least from the 1st century onward, when enslaved Africans were trafficked across the Red Sea to Arabia and Yemen.

East Africa came to act as a supply source for slaves to the Arabian Peninsula via the Indian Ocean slave trade since at least the Middle Ages. While the majority of these slaves appear to have been shipped to the Arabian Peninsula via Oman and Muscat rather than via the Red Sea, the Red Sea was also a route for the slave trade between East Africa and the Arabian Peninsula. It also acted as a route for slaves to Egypt.

The Red Sea slave trade appear to have expanded significantly during the Islamic period, particularly during the Abbasid Caliphate. African slaves were transported in the 9th century via the Red Sea slave trade from Africa across the Red Sea to the slave markets of Jeddah, Mecca and Medina, and from there by caravan over the desert to the slave market of Baghdad. The Red Sea slave trade between Africa and the Arabian Peninsula continued for centuries until its final abolition in the 1960s, when slavery in Saudi Arabia was abolished in 1962.

==== Indian Ocean slave trade ====
The Indian Ocean slave trade established, in which slaves were trafficked from East Africa across the Indian Ocean by dhow through the Persian Gulf to Ras al Khymah, Dubai, Bandrar Abbas, Bushine and Basra.

=== Asian slave trade ===
==== Indian people ====
Warfare and tax revenue policies was the cause of enslavement of Indians for the Central Asian slave market already during the Umayyad conquest of Sindh in the 8th century, when the armies of the Umayyad commander Muhammad bin Qasim enslaved tens of thousands of Indian civilians and well as soldiers.

During the Ghaznavid campaigns in India in the 11th century, hundreds of thousands of Indians were captured and sold on the Central Asian slave markets; in 1014 "the army of Islam brought to Ghazna (in Afghanistan) about 200,000 captives ("qarib do sit hazar banda"), and much wealth, so that the capital appeared like an Indian city, no soldier of the camp being without wealth, or without many slaves", and during the expedition of the Ghaznavid ruler Sultan Ibrahim to the Multan area of northwestern India 100,000 captives were brought back to Central Asia, and the Ghaznavids were said to have captured "five hundred thousand slaves, beautiful men and women". During his twelfth expedition into India in 1018–1019, the armies of Mahmud of Ghazni captured so many Indian slaves that the prices fell and according to al-'Utbi, "merchants came from distant cities to purchase them, so that the countries of Ma Wara' An-nahr (Central Asia), 'Iraq and Khurasan were filled with them, and the fair and the dark, the rich and the poor, mingled in one common slavery".

==== Turkic people ====
Turkic peoples belonged to the most common categories of slaves to the Abbasid Caliphate after Africans. They were foremost favored for military slavery.

Turkic people from the Central Asian Steppe (Turkestan), were a major supply source for slaves to the Abbasid Caliphate during the entire Middle Ages. They were Pagans, adherents of Tengrism, and thereby viewed as legitimate targets of slavery. In the Middle East, they were referred to as "white" and used for military slavery for centuries during the Middle Ages. Turkic slaves were trafficked to the Abbasid Caliphate via the Bukhara slave trade.

al-Baladhuri described how Caliph al-Mamun used to write to his governors in Khurasan to raid those peoples of Transoxiana who had not submitted to Islam:

"when al-Mutasim became Caliph he did the same to the point that most of his military leaders came from Transoxiana: Soghdians, Farhanians, Ushrusanians, peoples of Shash, and others [even] their kings came to him. Islam spread among those who lived there, so they began raiding the Turks who lived there".

Turkic slaves were the main slave supply of the Samanid slave trade, and regularly formed a part of the land tax sent to the Abbasid capital of Baghdad; the geographer Al-Maqdisi (ca. 375/985) noted that in his time the annual levy (ḵarāj) included 1,020 slaves.

From the early 9th century, military slavery played a major military role in the Abbasid Caliphate, and Turkic male slaves were particularly favored for the role of slave soldiers.

=== European slave trade ===
European slaves were referred to as saqaliba. The Vikings sold both Christian and Pagan European captives to the Muslims, who referred to them as saqaliba; these slaves were likely both Pagan Slavic, Finnic and Baltic Eastern Europeans as well as Christian Europeans. European slaves were viewed as luxury goods and primarily served in the households of royalty and rich people. There were several routes for saqaliba slaves to the Abbasid Caliphate.

==== Khazar and Bukhara slave trade ====
The main route of European slaves to the Caliphate was the Eastern Volga trade route via Russia and Central Asia down to Baghdad via Persia. Initially via the Khazar slave trade, and later via the Samanid slave trade.

The Vikings trafficked European slaves captured in Viking raids in Europe in the East in two destinations from present day Russia via the Volga trade route; one to Slavery in the Abbasid Caliphate in the Middle East via the Caspian Sea, the Samanid slave trade and Iran; and one to the Byzantine Empire and the Mediterranean via Dnieper and the Black Sea slave trade. People taken captive during the Viking raids in Europe could be brought to Scandinavia or sold to Moorish Spain via the Dublin slave trade. Captives from Viking raids in Eastern Europe could be transported to Hedeby or Brännö and from there via the Volga trade route to Russia, where slaves and furs were sold to Muslim merchants in exchange for Arab silver dirham and silk, which have been found in Birka, Wollin, and Dublin; initially this trade route between Europe and the Abbasid Caliphate passed via the Khazar Kaghanate, but from the early 10th century onward it went via Volga Bulgaria and from there by caravan to Khwarazm, to the Samanid slave market in Central Asia and finally via Iran to the Abbasid Caliphate.

This slave trade is known to have functioned from at least between 786 and 1009, as big quantities of silver coins from the Samanid Empire has been found in Scandinavia from these years, and people taken captive by the Vikings during their raids in Europe were likely sold in Islamic Central Asia, a slave trade which was so lucrative that it may have contributed to the Viking raids across Europe, used by the Vikings as a slave supply source for their slave trade with Islamic world.

==== Al-Andalus slave trade ====
Other routes for saqaliba slaves to the Caliphate was via the al-Andalus slave trade in Western Europe. From the Prague slave trade of Pagan Slavs via France to slavery in al-Andalus in Spain, and via the al-Andalus slave trade to the Abbasid Caliphate. The al-Andalus slave trade was significantly reduced with the end of the Prague slave trade in the 11th century, but continued in a smaller scale until the end of the reconquista.

Andalusian Saracen pirates established a base in Camargue, Fraxinetum or La Garde-Freinet-Les Mautes (888–972), from which they made slave raids in to France and the Fraxinetum slave trade exported the Frankish prisoners they captured as slaves to the Muslim world.

Slaves captured by the Vikings in the British islands were also sold via the Dublin slave trade to the al-Andalus slave market.

==== Saracen piracy ====
Saracens from Aghlabids of Ifriqiya managed an extensive slave trade of Italians captured in Southern Italy to Abbasid Maghreb from the early the mid-9th century.

While the Saracen bases in France was eliminated in 972 and Italy in 1091, this did not prevent the Saracen piracy slave trade of the Mediterranean; both Almoravid dynasty (1040–1147) and the Almohad Caliphate (1121–1269) approved of the slave raiding of Saracen pirates toward non-Muslim ships in Gibraltar and the Mediterranean for the purpose of slave raiding.

== Slave market ==
The slave market and use of slaves in the Abbasid Caliphate divided slaves into male, female and eunuchs. The slaves were also divided in skin color. Eunuchs were used for domestic and administrative purpose; male slaves were used for labor and military slavery; and females were used for domestic service and sexual slavery (concubinage).

Thousands and possibly millions of Africans, Berbers, Turks, and European saqaliba are estimated to have been enslaved in this time period.

Slavery was inherited unless the free Muslim father of the child had chosen to acknowledge the child as his, and slave children were highly appreciated, since they could learn Arab customs and language from childhood. Jābir ibn Ḥayyān described the best female slaves as the Makkiyyāt, who regardless of their parents’ ethnicity were born and raised among the Arabs in Mecca: called muwalladāt, they spoke fluent Arabic and was raised in Arab customs and prepared from childhood to please their owners.

The manumission of a slave was considered a good act, but was not mandatory, but a free choice of an enslaver.

=== Female slaves ===
Female slaves were primarily used as either domestic servants, or as concubines (sex slaves), while male slaves were used in a number of tasks. The sex slave-concubines of rich Urban men who had given birth to the son of their enslaver were counted as the most privileged, since they became an Umm Walad and became free upon the death of their enslaver; the concubine of a Beduoin mainly lived the same life as the rest of the tribal members and the women of the family. Female domestic slaves lived a hard life and reproduction among slaves was low; it was noted that the infant mortality was high among slaves, and that female slaves were often raped in their childhood and rarely lived in their forties, and that poorer slave owners often prostituted them.

The slave trade in the Muslim world focused on women for used of domestic servants and sex slaves. Women were trafficked to the royal Abbasid harem from Europe via the Volga trade route, as well as from Africa and Asia. The royal harem was used as a role model for the harems of other wealthy men. Women from Europe, Central Asia, Asia and Africa was used as sex slaves and domestic servants within the royal harem and the lesser harems of private men, as well as the harems of local principalities within the Abbasid Caliphate.

Slave women were visually identified by their way of dress. While Islamic law dictated that a free Muslim woman should veil herself entirely, except for her face and hands, in order to hide her awrah (intimate parts) and avoid sexual harassment, the awrah of slave women were defined differently, and she was only to cover between her navel and her knee. This difference became even more prominent during the Abbasid Caliphate, when free Muslim women, in particular those of the upper classes, were subjected to even more sex segregation and harem seclusion, in contrast to the qiyan slave artists, who performed unveiled in male company.

==== Concubines ====
Female slaves for the use of sexual slavery, concubines, were a main category for women on the slave market. The position of concubines underwent some change during the Abbasid Caliphate.

The child of a slave was born in to slavery unless an enslaver chose to acknowledge the child of a slave as his. A male enslaver could choose to officially acknowledge his son with his concubine if he wished to do so. If he choose to do so, the child would be automatically manumitted. During the preceding Umayyad dynasty, sons born of wives and sons born of female slaves were not treated as equals: while the Umayyad Caliphs could acknowledge their sons with slave concubines, slave sons were not considered suitable as heirs to the throne until during the Abbasid dynasty. During the Abbasid dynasty, a number of Caliphs were the acknowledged sons of slave concubines. During the Abbasid era, appointing the acknowledged sons of slave concubines as heirs became common, and from the 9th century onward, acquiring male heirs through a slave concubine became a common custom for Abbasid citizens.

If a man choose to acknowledge the child of a female slave as his, the slave mother became an umm walad. This meant that they could no longer sold and were to become manumitted upon the death of their enslaver; during the first centuries of Islam, umm walad-slaves were still bought and sold and rented out until the death of their enslaver, but during the Abbasid era this slowly stopped.

==== Qiyan ====
The most expensive type of female slave were the female entertainer known as qiyan. During the Abbasid Caliphate, sex segregation was finally fully completed. All free Muslim women were expected to be secluded from men in such a high degree as their financial circumstances made practically possible. In the case of women of upper and middle classes, this resulted in full harem seclusion. The disappearance of women from social life expanded the institution of the qiyan; the female slave entertainer. Being a slave, the qiyan was not subjected to the sex segregation enforced upon free Muslim women. The female qiyan slave entertainer, often referred to as "singing slave girls", were instructed in a number of accomplishments, such as poetry, music, recitating akhbar (accounts or anecdotes), calligraphy and shadow puppetry.

Qiyan-slave-girls were initially imported to al-Andalus from Medina. Qiyan slave-girls are noted to have been first imported to al-Andalus during the reign of al-Hakam I (r. 796–822). However, qiyan soon started to be trained in Cordoba and from 1013 in Seville; it is however unknown if the tradition was preserved in the Emirate of Granada. Qiyan-slaves were selected to be trained for this function as children, and underwent a long training to fit the demands. During reign of the Caliph al-Amin (r. 809–813) in Baghdad, there was a category known as ghulamyyat, slave-girls dressed as boys, who were trained to perform as singers and musicians and who attended the drinking parties of the sovereign and his male guests, and this custom is known in al-Andalus in the reign of Caliph al-Hakam II (r. 961–976).

Ibn Butlan noted that the ideal training of a qiyan slave girl was long: it was recommended that a slave-girl was taken from her country age of nine; spent three years of training at Madinah, three years at Makkah, and taken to Iraq at the age of fifteen to be trained in cultural refinement (adab) at age fifteen, before she was sold for performance as a qiyan entertainer, in order to acquire the feminine qualities of the Medinese women, the delicacy of Makkah and the cultural refinement of Iraq. In al-Isbahani's Kitab al-Aghani, Ibrahim al-Mawsili noted that originally slave girls with dark complexion had been selected to be trained as qiyan, because they were viewed as unattractive, but that this custom had changed and white slave-girls, who were considered more beautiful and were therefore more expensive, had started to be trained as qiyan to increase their market value even more:

"People did not use to teach beautiful slave-girls to sing, but instead only taught light brown and black [slave girls to sing]. The first person to teach expensive [fair-skinned] slave-girls to sing was my father. He achieved the highest level [of training] of female singers, and thereby raised their value".

The qiyan-slaves were not secluded from men in harem as free women or slave concubines, but in contrast performed for male guests – sometimes from behind a screen and sometimes visible – and are the perhaps most well documented of all female slaves. While trained qiyan-slaves were sexually available to their enslaver, they were not categorized or sold as concubines and, with their training, were the most expensive female slaves.

=== Male slaves ===
The uses of male slaves were far more varied than the use of female slaves. Male slaves were divided in to eunuchs and non-eunuchs. Since eunuchs lacked family of their own and were unable to have children, they were considered highly thrustworthy, and used as harem guards, as guards at mosques and holy sites, as administrators and family stewards. Non-castrated male slaves were used for hard labor as well as for military slavery.

Generally the Muslim world preferred female slaves over male slaves. However male slaves still reached substantial numbers in some parts of the Muslim world. In 763 a slave rebellion took place in Medina, the Medina slave rebellion, to resist the Abbasid troops under the leadership of Muhammad ibn 'Abd Allah al-Nafs al-Zakiya, leader of the local black slave population; the rebellion was finally put down when the Abbasids agreed to appoint another governor to Medina.

==== Eunuchs ====
The custom of using eunuchs as servants for women inside the Islamic harem had a preceding example in the life of Muhammad himself, who used the eunuch Mabur as a servant in the house of his concubine Maria al-Qibtiyya; both of them slaves from Egypt. Eunuchs were for a long time used in relatively small numbers, exclusively inside harems, but the use of eunuchs expanded significantly when eunuchs started being used also for other offices within service and administration outside of the harem, a use which expanded gradually during the Umayyad dynasty and had its breakthrough during the Abbasid Caliphate.

Eunuchs were an active component in the slave market of the Islamic world until the early 20th century for service in harem as well as in the corps of mostly African eunuchs who guarded the Prophet Muhammad's tomb in Medina and the Kaʿba in Mecca. During the Middle Ages, the first aghawat, eunuchs of Indian, Byzantine (Greek) and African heritage are noted as the guards of the grave of Prophet Muhammed in Medina. Traditionally the history of the Aghawat dates back to the time of Nur al-Din Zengi (commonly known as Nur ad-Din), one of the rulers of the Zengid dynasty, in the year 1161. He is stated to have brought them as servants and protectors to Madinah after the Crusaders attempted to invade the Prophet Muhammad's tomb in Madinah. Nur ad-Din sent the first Aghawat in history, who were 12 eunuch males, and established the main conditions for their selection. It was noted that boys from Africa were still openly bought to become eunuch novices to serve at Medina in 1895. In Medina, there was a part of town named Haarat al-Aghawat (Neighborhood of the Aghas). In 1990, seventeen eunuchs remained.

==== Slave laborers ====
Slave labourers were used in cash-crop production, in the silk textile industry, in salt production and land reclamation, in cotton and sugar production especially in the area of the big slave market center of Basra. Slave labourers were kept in big work camps, and often had to be replaced by new slaves through the slave trade, since the marshlands in Mesopotamia caused slaves to die in large numbers from malaria, and slaves were not allowed to marry or have children. Around 15,000 slaves were estimated to be kept in the Basra area at any given time, and that a quarter of the labour force consisted of slave labor. Contemporary writers in the late 9th century estimated that there were around 300,000 slaves in Iraq. The harsh condition resulted in a big slave rebellion known as the Zanj Rebellion, which lasted between 869 and 883.

==== Military slavery ====
From the early 9th century, slaves, specifically Turkic slaves, were also employed as slave soldiers. A contemporary witness from 766 describe the Caliphal army as an army consisting of "non-converted barbarians", that is to say slaves such as Sindhis, Alanians, khazars and Turkac people.

During the 9th century, the practice of using slave soldiers spread everywhere in the Abbasid Caliphate. Local power holders such as the Abbasid governors in North Africa wished to create military forces with soldiers who lacked loyalty to anyone but themselves, such as family or clan, and therefore created armies using slave soldiers, a method that was swiftly followed by the Caliph himself.

Both Caliph al-Hakam of Cordoba (r. 796–822) and Caliph al-Mutasim (r. 830–842) in Baghdad are confirmed to have had a personal palace guard composed entirely by slaves, and this became the rule. The military system of slave soldiers are estimated to have been permanently established by the rule of al-Mutasim (r. 830–842). Caliph Al-Mu'tasim reportedly had an army of at least 7,000 Turkic slave soldiers, appointed former slave soldiers to serve as governors and stated that there "none like the Turk for service".

From the 9th century onward, an army and a personal palace guard composed by slave soldiers became the norm for any Muslim ruler to secure his authority in his Palace as well as in his province. The preferred ethnicity of the slaves used as slave soldiers varied between different parts of the Middle East: Saqaliba slaves dominated in al-Andalus; Berbs dominated in North Africa; African men were used in Egypt, and Turkic men were preferred in Mesopotamia and Persia.

=== Royal Caliphal harem ===
It was during the Abbasid Caliphate that the royal women were finally fully secluded in harem sex segregation. While the royal harem existed also during the Umayyad era, it was during the Abbasid era that it became fully segregated. As late as the 770s, the mother of the Caliph, Al-Khayzuran, was still able to grant audience to male visitors and speak with them, and after that, all women of the Caliphal family were secluded from all visibility in public life.

The hierarchy of the Caliphal Abbasid harem placed the mother of the Caliph in the top place. The mother of the Caliph was often a former slave. The legal wives of the Caliph had second rank. The wives of the Caliph were often former slave concubines whom the Caliph had chosen to manumit in order to marry. Also the unmarried, divorced or widowed female relatives of the Caliph could live in the harem. The concubines of the Caliph were female slaves of non-Muslim origin. A category of female slaves were active as entertainers, performing as singers, dancers and recited poetry to the Caliph and the women of the harem. A third category of female slaves, known as qahramana, were employed in a number of different servant positions within the harem and were allowed to leave the harem on errands and in order to act as a middle hand between the harem and the outside world. The harem was guarded by the enslaved eunuchs. No women of the harem with the exception of the qahramana slaves were normally allowed to leave the harem.

The Caliphal harem had a great number of slaves: Caliph Al-Mutawakkil (r. 847–861) reportedly owned 4,000 slave concubines Al-Muqtadir (r. 908–932) 11,000 slave eunuchs, while the Caliph Al-Mansur (r. 754–775) was given 100 slave virgin girls as a gift after the death of his wife Arwa bint Mansur al-Himyari in 764.

The Caliphal harem became a role model for other rich men to emulate in smaller scale, and also served as a role model for the royal harems of the local dynasties who emerged from the Abbasid Caliphate, such as the Fatimid harem of the Fatimid dynasty of Egypt, as well as the harem of the Umayyad state of Córdoba of al-Andalus.

=== Racial dimension of slavery ===
There was a dimension of racism in the slavery of the Abbasid Caliphate. Since all non-Muslims not living under Islamic rule were considered a legitimate target of enslavement by Islamic law, the slaves in the Caliphate could be of many different races. However, this did not prevent a racist component of slavery. Slaves were valued differently on the market depending on their race, and were considered to have different abilities because of their racial identity, and a racial hierarchy existed among slaves of different races in the Caliphate.

The visual ethnic diversion was noticed by the contemporary writers, and ascribed different temperament, talents, abilities, advantages and disadvantages. Jābir ibn Ḥayyān wrote in the 9th century:

"Byzantines have cleaner vaginas than other female slaves have. Andalusians […] are the most beautiful, sweet-smelling and receptive to learning […] Andalusians and Byzantines have the cleanest vaginas, whereas Alans (Lāniyyāt) and Turks have unclean vaginas and get pregnant easier. They have also the worst dispositions. Sindhis, Indians, and Slavs (Ṣaqāliba) and those similar to them are the most condemned. They have uglier faces, fouler odor, and are more spiteful. Besides, they are unintelligent and difficult to control, and have unclean vaginas. East Africans (Zanj) are the most heedless and coarse. If one finds a beautiful, sound and graceful woman among them, however, no their species can match her. […] Women from Mecca (Makkiyāt) are the most beautiful and pleasurable of all types."

Ibn Butlan (11th-century) described the racial prejudices ascribing the suitability of certain tasks to slaves in accordance to their racial ethnicity, noting:

"He who wants a slave to guard his life and property should take one from the Indians and Nubians. He who wants a slave for [private] service [doorkeeper, domestic servant] should take one from the Zanj and the Armenians, and whoever desires a slave for bravery and warfare should take one from the Turks and Slavs. [...] He who wants a nice slave-girl should take one from those of the Berbers. He who wants a store-keeper (khuzzān) should take one from the Byzantine (al-Rūm) slaves. He who wants a slave to nurse babies should take one from the Persians. He who wants a slave girl for pleasure should take one from the Zanj women, and he who wants a slave-girl for singing songs should take one from Makkah".

Racism against Black Africans was a part of the enslavement of Africans in the Arab world after Islam. While there had been a trade in slaves from Africa to both the Hellenistic world, the Roman Empire and Pre-Islamic Arabia, this was in a relatively small scale; but the massive expansion of slave trade from Africa after the Islamic conquests made Africans the most common ethnicity for slaves, and most Africans that Arabs interacted with were slaves, which increased racism against Africans. By the 8th century, Blackness was associated with ugliness and inferior status, and this was mentioned by black Arab poets in their writings. Black skin was associated with evil, devilry and damnation, while white skin carried the opposite associations, a racist stereotype described also in the Quran (III: 102).

During the first century of Islam, Black slaves and freedmen could achieve fame and recognition, but from the Umayyad Caliphate onward, Black freedmen (unlike white), are with rare exceptions no longer noted to have achieved any higher positions of wealth, power, privilege or success, and contemporary Arab Muslim writers contributed this factor to a lack of capacity.

Arab racist stereotypes against Black Africans portrayed Black people as people with a simple piety, but also with an unbridled sexuality with immense potency, a stereotype described in "The Thousand and One Nights". The stereotypical Black man was described both as a seducer or rapist of white women, but also himself a victim of frustrated white wives and daughters, while the Black woman was ascribed both repulsive ugliness as well as incandescent sexuality by Arab poets.

Asian slaves had a higher status than African slaves. Turkic men were widely regarded to be brave and suitable for military slavery. Caliph Mutasim had 70.000 Turkic slave soldiers, and one of his governors noted that there were "none like the Turk for service". While Turkic men were considered brave soldiers, Turkic women were seen as ideal for giving birth to brave sons.

==== Slave breeding ====
Muslim enslavers were by Islamic law permitted to breed slaves. While the child of a slave became free if her master choose to acknowledge the child as his, the child of two slaves was born a slave. Since slaves were considered to have different abilities because of their race, slave-breeding was practiced to produce offspring of desired traits. A popular slave-breeding was that between a man from Khurasan and a woman from India, and this was regularly practiced in Kufa. The author al Jāḥiẓ (d. 868–869) wrote:

"In Kufa there was an excellent brood (nitāj karīm) of male slaves from Khurasan and female slaves from India. The union between these two brought forth [slaves with] delicate brown complexion and beautiful stature. This went on for so long time that it became a reason behind common people's preference for slaves from Kufa over slaves from Basra. Nevertheless, the expensive and valuable slave women, who were the most outstanding and distinguished, were from Basra, not Kufa."

He continues:

"Know that there is abundant happiness and complete pleasure only in the brood of two dissimilar kinds. The breeding between them is the elixir that leads to purity. Specifically, that is the mating of an Indian woman with a Khurasanian man; they will give birth to pure gold."

== See also ==
- Afro-Iraqis
- History of slavery in the Muslim world
- History of concubinage in the Muslim world
- Medieval Arab attitudes to Black people
- Xenophobia and racism in the Middle East
- Racism in the Arab world
- Racism in Muslim communities
- Slavery in al-Andalus

== Referenced material ==
- Segal, Ronald (2001). Islam's Black Slaves: The Other Black Diaspora. New York: Farrar, Straus and Giroux. ISBN 9780374527976.
