= Ashinsky =

Ashinsky (masculine), Ashinskaya (feminine), or Ashinskoye (neuter) may refer to:

- Aaron M. Ashinsky (1866–1954), Polish-born rabbi who ministered in America and Canada
- Ashinsky District, a district of Chelyabinsk Oblast, Russia
- Ashinskoye Urban Settlement, a municipal formation which the Town of Asha in Ashinsky District of Chelyabinsk Oblast, Russia is incorporated as
- Ashinsky (rural locality), a rural locality (a village) in Iglinsky District of the Republic of Bashkortostan, Russia
