= Slavery in Saudi Arabia =

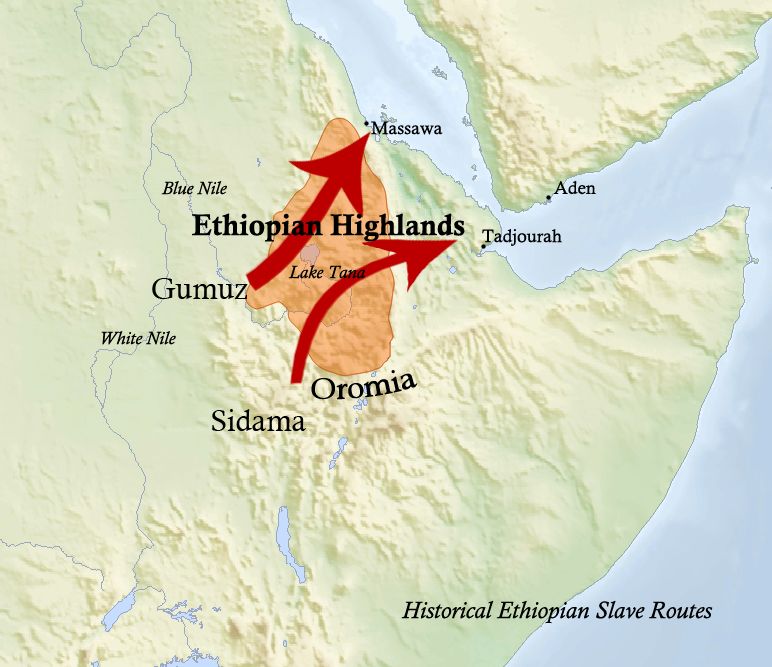
Slave trade routes through Ethiopia.

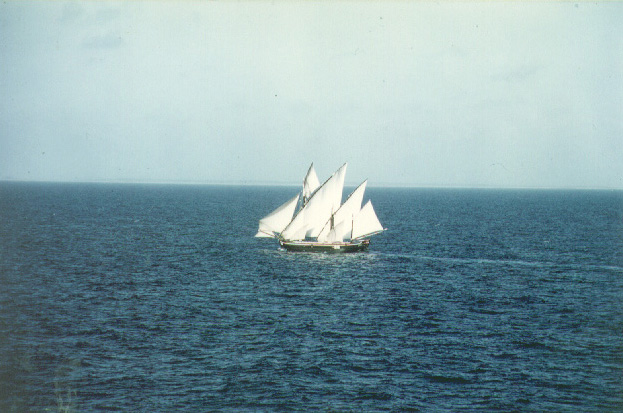
Dhows were used to transport goods and slaves.

African slaves in an unspecified location in Saudi Arabia, c. 1890

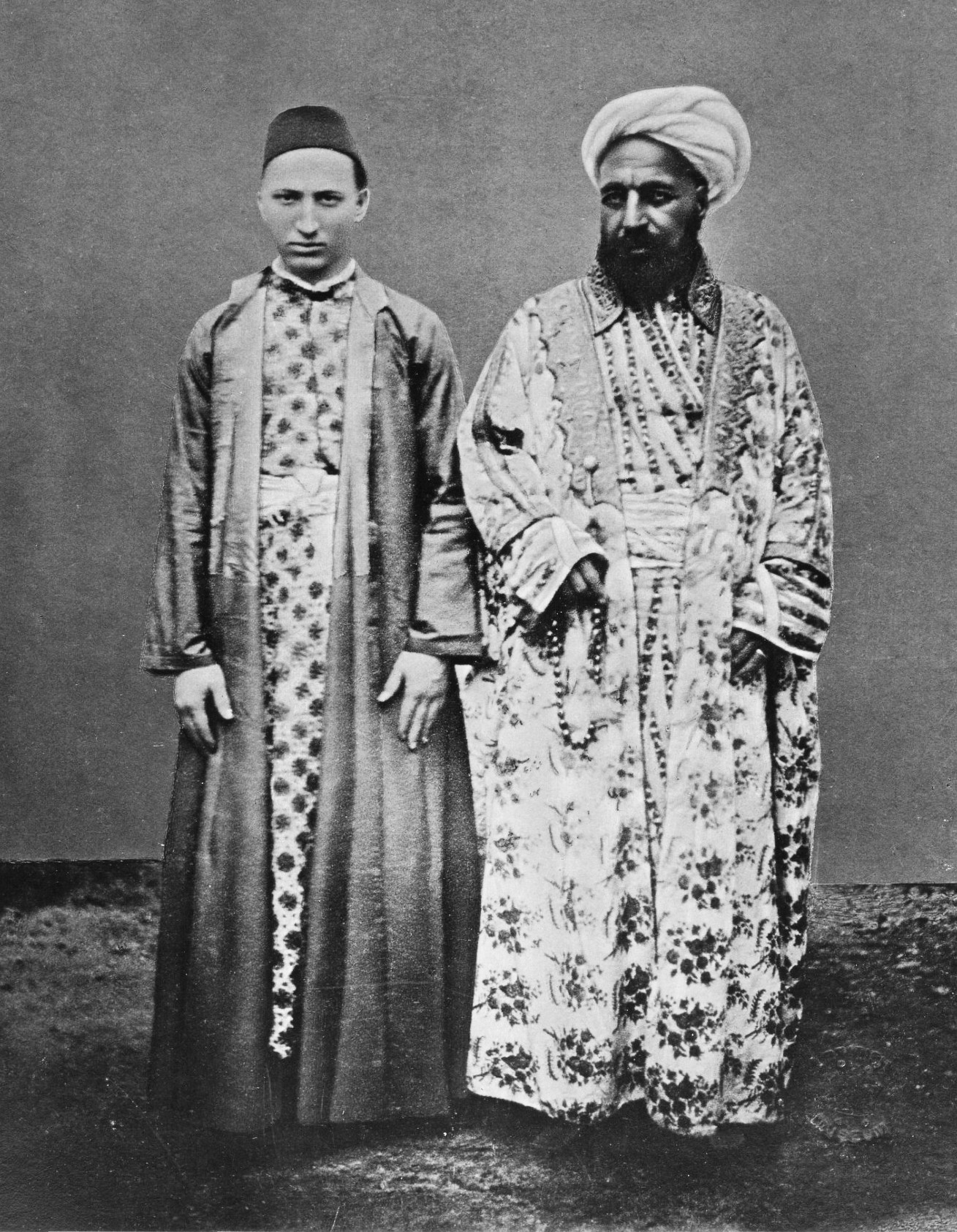
A Meccan merchant (right) and his Circassian slave, between 1886 and 1887.

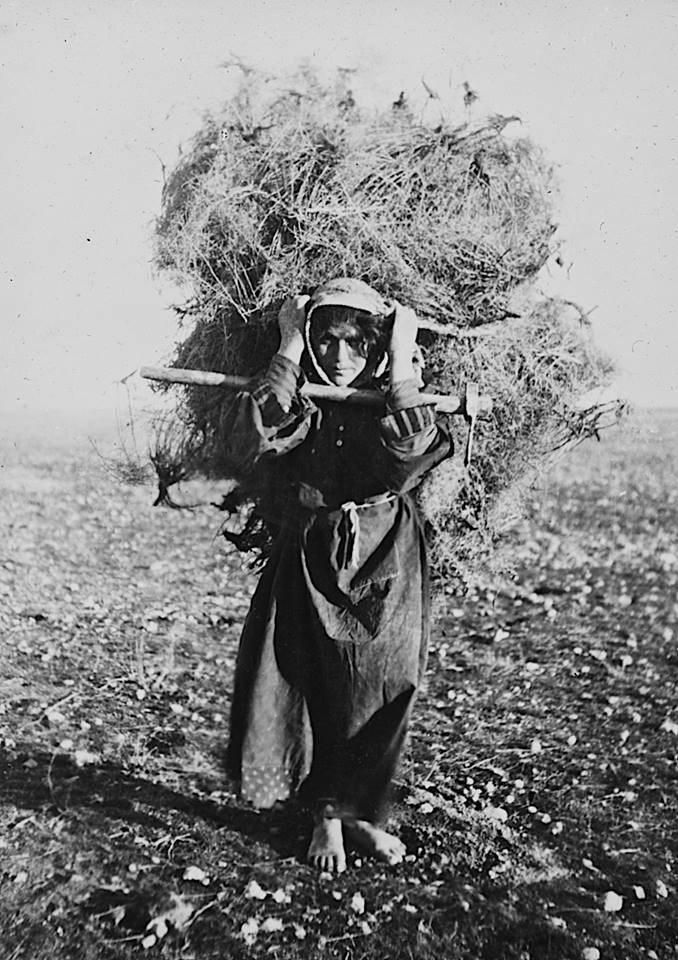
An enslaved Armenian woman carries thistles

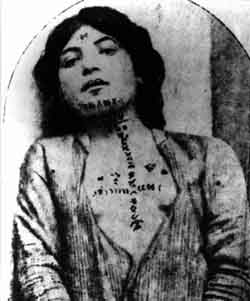
A female Armenian slave

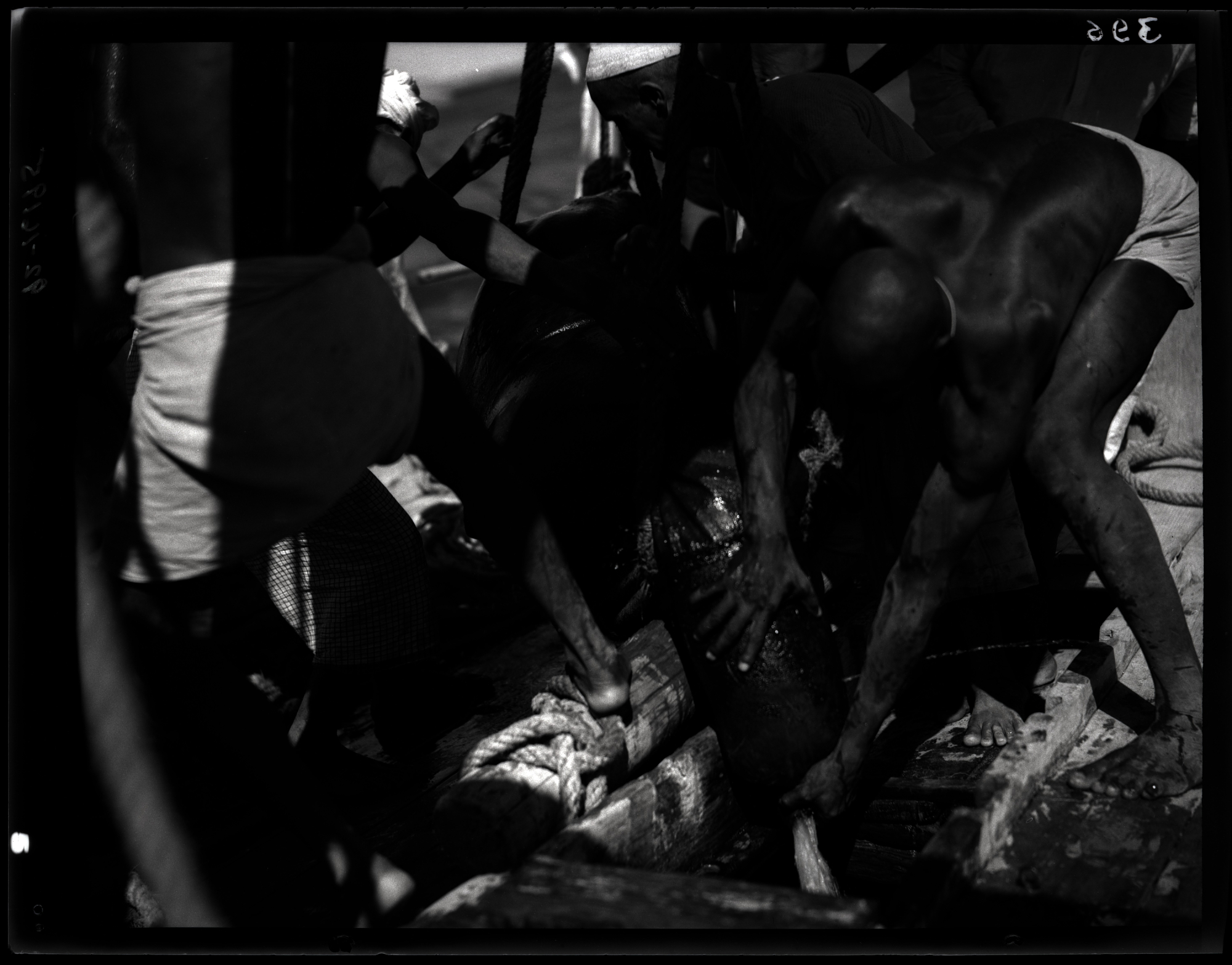
Jubail, 1935. The Pearling industry in the region at the time was dominated by African slave labor.

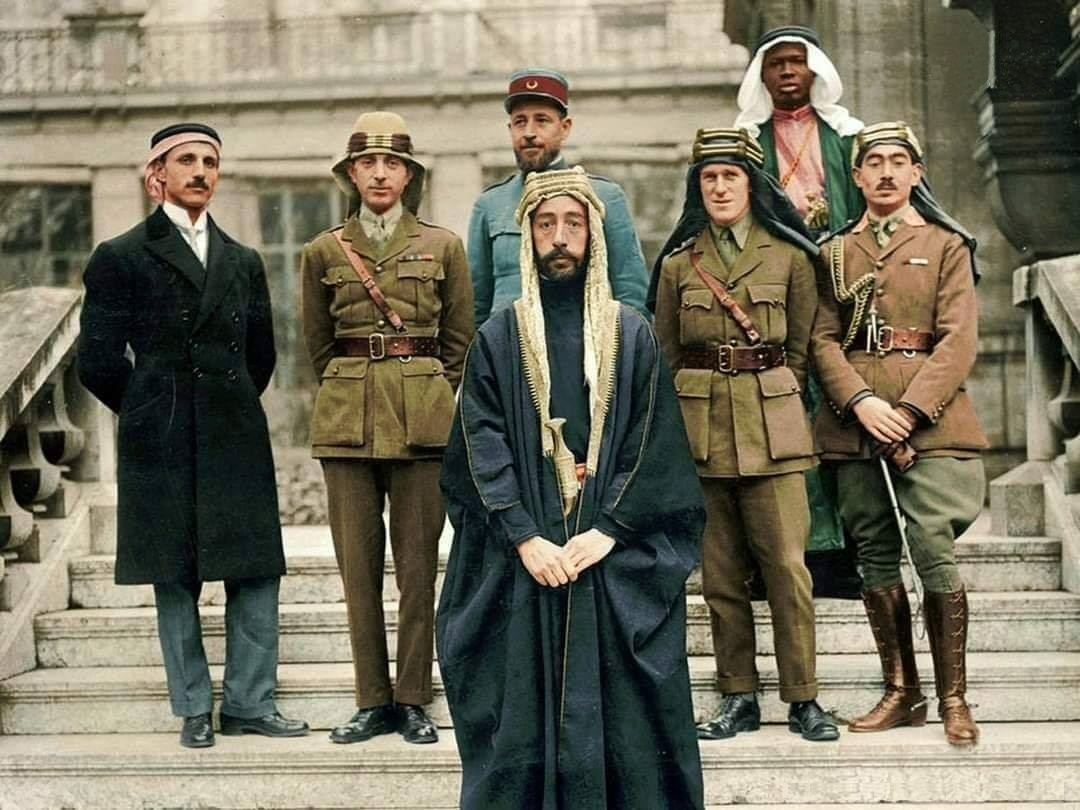
Said el Feisal (back-right) with Prince Faisal (centre) and delegation at Versailles.

Legal chattel slavery existed in Saudi Arabia from antiquity until its abolition in the 1960s.

Hejaz (the western region of modern day Saudi Arabia), which encompasses approximately 12% of the total land area of Saudi Arabia, was under the control of the Ottoman Empire from 1517 to 1918, and as such nominally obeyed the Ottoman laws. When the area became an independent nation first as the Kingdom of Hejaz and then as Saudi Arabia, it was a slave trade center during the interwar period. After World War II, growing international pressure eventually resulted in the formal abolition of the practice. Slavery was formally abolished in 1962. Many members of the Afro-Saudi minority are descendants of the former slaves.

In contemporary Saudi Arabia, the kafala system, in which foreign workers are tied to a single employer for the duration of their time in Saudi Arabia, and often have their passports confiscated, has been described by human rights organizations as a form of modern slavery. The labor performed by kafala workers is similar to labor previously performed by slaves, and the workers often come from similar parts of the world from which slaves were previously imported.

== Background ==
Historically, the institution of slavery in the region of the later Saudi Arabia was reflected in the institution of slavery in the Rashidun Caliphate (632–661), slavery in the Umayyad Caliphate (661–750), slavery in the Abbasid Caliphate (750–1258), slavery in the Mamluk Sultanate (1258–1517), slavery in the Ottoman Empire (1517–1916) and of slavery in the Kingdom of Hejaz (1916–1925), realms which all included the region later to become Saudi Arabia. The chattel slavery as it looked like in Saudi Arabia was founded in Islamic law, and built upon the institution of slavery as it looked like in the prior Islamic empires in the area.

The region of the Arabian Peninsula which was renamed Saudi Arabia in 1932, was nominally under the Ottoman Empire between 1517 and 1918, and as such it nominally adhered to the same laws as the rest of the slavery in the Ottoman Empire in regard to the slavery and slave trade. Ottoman anti-slavery laws were not enforced in practice, particularly not in Hejaz; the first attempt to ban the Red Sea slave trade in the region was the Imperial Firman of 1857, with Hejaz being explicitly exempted from the ban in the wake of the 1854–56 Hejaz rebellion.

The Anglo-Ottoman Convention of 1880 formally banned the Red Sea slave trade, but was not enforced in the Ottoman Provinces in the Arabian Peninsula. In 1908 the Ottoman Empire nominally abolished slavery in its territory, but again this law was not enforced in the Arabian Peninsula.

== Slave trade ==
Enslaved Africans have been sold in the Arab World since antiquity. While in pre-Islamic Arabia, Arab war captives were common targets of slavery, it appears that slaves were also imported from Ethiopia across the Red Sea. The Red Sea slave trade appears to have been established by at least the 1st century AD, when enslaved Africans were trafficked across the Red Sea to destinations in Arabia and Yemen.

After World War I and the collapse of the Ottoman Empire the area formed an independent nation as the Kingdom of Hejaz (1916–1925). Hejaz did not consider itself obliged to obey the laws and treaties signed by the Ottomans regarding slavery and the slave trade. During the interwar period, the Kingdom of Hejaz was internationally known as a regional slave trade center. The Red Sea slave trade was, together with the Trans-Saharan slave trade and the Indian Ocean slave trade, one of the three main routes comprising what has been called in historiography the "Islamic slave trade", "Oriental slave trade", or the "Arab slave trade," which involved the trafficking of enslaved people from sub-Saharan Africa to the Muslim world.

By the 20th century, slaves were primarily trafficked from West Africa, East Africa, the Arabian Peninsula, the Levant, and South-Western Asia.

A former Royal Air Force pilot, who trafficked slaves from Africa into Arabia in the 1950s, stated: "That's where all roads end [...] Arabia", since Saudi Arabia was the center and end station of modern chattel slavery at the time, and drove the expanding slave trade market after WWII.

In the UN debate against slavery in 1957, Saudi Arabia was at the center of the debate since it was the hub of the slave trade network of the Arabian Peninsula, which kidnapped and enslaved people from Africa, the Aden Protectorate, the Trucial States, Baluchistan, and further away.

=== African slave route ===
The slave trade had two major routes to Hejaz. African slaves were trafficked primarily from Sudan and Ethiopia. Primarily children and young women were bought or given as tribute by their parents to Ethiopian chiefs, who sold them to slave traders. The parents were told that their children were going to be given a better life as slaves in Arabia. The slaves were delivered to Arabian slave traders by the coast and shipped across the Red Sea to Jeddah.

Eunuchs, female concubines and male labourers were the occupations of slaves sent from Ethiopia to Jidda and other parts of Hejaz. The southwest and southern parts of Ethiopia supplied most of the girls being exported by Ethiopian slave traders to India and Arabia. Female and male slaves from Ethiopia made up the main supply of slaves to India and the Middle East.

=== Chinese slave route ===
There was a long history of Chinese slave girls being sold to the Muslim harems in Aceh on Sumatra, where they were used as concubines (sex slaves); from Aceh, the Mui Tsai girls could be exported further for sale to Arabia. Under this form of the slave trade, the acquisition of slaves was officially called adoptions to avoid scrutiny from the authorities, since the colonial powers in the Dutch East Indies had banned slavery, and it was known to have continued during the Interwar period.

=== Indian slave route ===
Egypt and Hejaz were also the recipients of Indian women trafficked via Aden and Goa. Since Britain banned the slave trade in its colonies, 19th century British-ruled Aden was no longer a recipient of slaves and the slaves sent from Ethiopia to Arabia were shipped to Hejaz instead.

=== Hajj slave route ===
One slave route was connected to the Hajj pilgrimage. Already in the Middle Ages, the Hajj played a role in the slave trade; in 1416, al-Maqrizi described pilgrims coming from Takrur (near the Senegal River) brought 1,700 slaves with them to Mecca.

The annual pilgrimage to Mecca, the Hajj, was the biggest vehicle for enslavement. When the open trans-Saharan slave trade died out, Muslim-African Hajj pilgrims across the Sahara were duped or given low-cost travel expenses by tribal leaders. When they arrived at the East Coast, they were trafficked over the Red Sea in the dhows of the Red Sea slave trade or on small passenger planes, and discovered upon arrival in Saudi Arabia that they were to be sold on the slave market rather than to perform the Hajj.

Slave traders trafficked primarily women and children in the guise of wives, servants and pilgrims to Hejaz, where they were sold after arrival. The victims of this trafficking route were sometimes tricked, and taken on Hajj under false pretenses. Slave traders trafficked women to Hejaz by marrying them and then taking them on the Hajj, where they were sold, with their families later told that the women had died during the journey.

In a similar fashion, parents entrusted their children to slave traders under the impression that the slave traders were taking their children on Hajj, as servants, or as students. This category of trafficking victims came from all over the Muslim world, as far away as the East Indies and China. Some travelers sold their servants or poor travel companions in the Hajj, to pay for their travel costs.

The English traveler Charles M. Doughty, who visited Central Arabia in the 1880s, noted that African slaves were brought up to Arabia every year during the Hajj, and that "there are bondsmen and bondwomen and free negro families in every tribe and town".

To combat the Red Sea slave trade, which was strongly connected to the Hajj pilgrimage, the Inter-Sanitary Conference in Alexandria of 1927 declared that pilgrims were to travel only by steamers or motorboats to avoid the dhow slave boats. This regulation proved to be difficult to enforce in practice, and pilgrims continued to cross the Red Sea by dhow to land at places difficult to control. In 1933, Nigeria introduced a new passport system that required Hajj pilgrims to deposit funds to cover the expenses and return fares to prevent their enslavement during the Hajj.

In the 1950s, in connection to the Ad Hoc Committee on Slavery and the Supplementary Convention on the Abolition of Slavery, Barnett Janner described Saudi Arabia and Yemen as the only remaining states where slavery was still a legal institution:

The shipping of slaves occurs in only one particular area of the world, in the seas around Arabia. The warships most likely to search such slavers would be British, and I feel sure that there would not be any abuse of the right to search. I am sorry that we gave up the fight for that right. As far as I know, Saudi Arabia and Yemen are the only States in the world where chattel slavery is still a legal institution. Only a year or so ago a French Deputy—the person, I assume, to whom my hon. Friend referred—investigated the situation and found that every year ignorant Africans are lured on by agents to make a pilgrimage to Mecca. They are not told, of course, that they need a Saudi Arabian visa. When they arrive in Saudi Arabia without a visa they are arrested and put into prison for a few days and then handed over to licensed slave dealers. In addition, raids are made in Baluchistan and the Sheikdoms of the Persian Gulf and people are captured and carried off by land and sea, taken to small Saudi Arabian ports and sold in slave markets.

Similar to the defenders of slavery in the American South, slavery in Islamic societies has been described as a benevolent institution, and King Abd al-Aziz ibn Saud remarked to the British legation officer Munshi Ihsanullah that West Africans:

[...] lived like beasts, that they were much better off as slaves, and that if he had his way he would take all (West African) pilgrims as his slaves, raising them thus out of their depraved state and turning them into happy, prosperous and civilised beings.

=== Balochistan slave route ===
In the 1930s and 1940s, it was reported that slaves in Balochistan in modern-day Iran and Pakistan were shipped to Saudi Arabia via Oman and the Gulf states. It was reported that some people in Balochistan sold themselves or their children to slave traders to escape poverty. In 1943, it was reported that girls in Balochistan were shipped via Oman to Mecca, where they were popular as concubines since Caucasian girls were no longer available, and were sold for $350–450.

=== Buraimi slave route ===
The Buraimi Oasis was a staging post in a neutral border zone, mutually administered by Britain and Saudi Arabia and manned by Trucial Scouts, an Arab force with British officers.

When the British patrolling against slave ships on sea became more effective against the Red Sea slave trade and the Indian Ocean slave trade, slaves started to be imported by aircraft. A report by a British officer in Buraimi informed the Anti-Slavery International that 2,000 slaves annually were trafficked from West Africa to Buraimi via three aircraft per month. These flights arrived unofficially during nighttime and officially claimed to transport exclusively military supplies and military personnel, and when questioned about civilian passengers they stated that these were residents of Buraimi, arriving to visiting relatives.

The duties of the Trucial Oman Scouts (TOL) as of 1951 were to (1) maintain peace and good order on the Trucial States; (2) prevent or suppress any traffic of slaves (but not slavery itself as this was considered an 'internal affair' by the British); and (3) provide an escort for any British political representative traveling in the Trucial States.

The first major achievement of the Levies was the cessation of both the Buraimi slave trade into Saudi Arabia and abductions into slavery, especially in the area of the Buraimi Oasis, and by the end of 1951 this trade had reportedly ceased.

In practice, however, these people were trafficked from Buraimi to the slave markets in Saudi Arabia until the air flight slave trade was banned by Prince Feisal in 1962.

== Slave market ==
Richard Francis Burton described the slave market in Medina in the 1850s:

The bazar at Al-Madinah is poor and as almost all the slaves are brought from Meccah by the Jallabs or drivers after exporting the best to Egypt the town receives only the refuse [...] some of these slaves come from Abyssinia: the greater part are driven from the Galla country (Oromiya) and exported at the harbours of the Somali coast, Berberah, Tajoura and Zayla. As many as 2000 slaves from the former place, and 4000 from the later, are annually shipped off to Mocha, Jeddah, Suez and Maskat. [...] It is a large street roofed with matting and full of coffee-houses. The merchandise sat in rows parallel with the walls. The prettiest girls occupied the highest benches. Below were the plainer sort and lowest of all the boys. They were all gaily dressed in pink and other light-colored muslins with transparent veiles over their heads; and whether from the effect of such unusual splendor or from the re-action succeeding to their terrible land-journey and sea-voyage, they appeared perfectly happy.

Lady Evelyn Cobbold, who was a convert to Islam and performed the hajj to Mecca in 1934, described the slavery and the slave market in Mecca in appologetic terms in the 1930s:

"In a street called Suk-el-Abid there is a regular slave market and long stone benches run in front of the houses, where in early morning and late evening sit the slaves awaiting purchasers. The slaves are mostly African and of all ages, the women wearing veils which they lift when requested. There is scarcely a house in Mecca that has not got its slaves. Those where I am staying seem perfectly happy and are treated as part of the family. One jet-black old lady is a great character and rules the roost."

Cobbold described all slaves in Mecca as happy to be living in slavery during her stay.

=== Female slaves ===
Female slaves were primarily used as either domestic servant house slaves, or as concubines (sex slaves).

Black African women were primarily used as domestic house slaves rather than exclusively for sexual services, while white Caucasian women (normally Circassian or Georgian) were preferred as concubines (sex slaves); when the main slave route of white slave girls became harder to access after Russia's conquest of the Caucasus and Central Asia in the mid 19th-century, after which Baluchi and "Red" Ethiopian (Oromo and Sidamo) women became the preferred targets for sexual slavery.

Writing about the Arabia he visited in 1862, the English traveler W. G. Palgrave met large numbers of slaves. The effects of slave concubinage were apparent in the number of persons of mixed race and in the emancipation of slaves he found to be common. Charles Doughty, writing about 25 years later, made similar reports.

Egypt and Hejaz were also the recipients of Indian women trafficked via Aden and Goa.

Since Britain banned the slave trade in its colonies, 19th century British ruled Aden was no longer a recipient of slaves and the slaves sent from Ethiopia to Arabia were shipped to Hejaz instead. Slaves sent from Ethiopia to Jidda and other parts of Hejaz were eunuchs, female concubines and male labourers. The southwest and southern parts of Ethiopia supplied most of the girls being exported by Ethiopian slave traders to India and Arabia. Female and male slaves from Ethiopia made up the main supply of slaves to India and the Middle East.

After the Armenian genocide, Armenian girls flooded the Syrian slave market and many ended up in the harems of central Arabia.

In the 20th century, women and girls for the harem market were kidnapped not only from Africa and Baluchistan, but also from the Trucial States, the Nusayriyah Mountains in Syria, and the Aden Protectorate.

Syrian girls were trafficked from Syria to Saudi Arabia right before World War II and married to legally bring them across the border but then divorced and given to other men. A Syrian, Dr. Midhat, and Shaikh Yusuf, were accused of engaging in this traffic of Syrian girls to supply them to Saudis.

A report about slavery in Hejaz in the 1920s stated that Arab men viewed buying concubines on the slave market as a cheaper alternative to marriage, and girls where sold for different prices depending on race; with African Ethiopian girls being sold for $100, while Christian Chinese girls (Mui tsai) were sold for $500.

Harem concubines existed in Saudi Arabia until the very end of the abolition of slavery in Saudi Arabia in 1962. King Abdulaziz of Saudi Arabia (r. 1932–1953) is known to have had a harem of 22 women, many of them concubines. Baraka Al Yamaniyah (d. 22 August 2018), for example, was the concubine of King Abdulaziz of Saudi Arabia (r. 1932–1953) and the mother of Muqrin bin Abdulaziz (born 1945), who was crown prince of Saudi Arabia in 2015.

In Jeddah, in the Kingdom of Hejaz on the Arabian Peninsula, the Arab king Ali bin Hussein, King of Hejaz had in his palace 20 young Javanese girls from Java (modern day Indonesia).

Female slaves were also given as gifts between rulers: in November 1948, for example, the ruler of Dubai gifted a number of female slaves to King Ibn Saud and his sons for a car and 10,000 ryals.

Historically, prostitution was connected to slavery. The Islamic Law formally prohibited prostitution. However, since the principle of concubinage in Islam in Islamic Law allowed a man to have sexual intercourse with his female slave, prostitution in the Islamic world was commonly practiced by a pimp selling his female slave on the slave market to a client, who was then allowed to have sex with her as her new owner; the client would then cancel his purchase and return the slave to her pimp on the pretext of discontent, which was a legal and accepted method for prostitution in the Islamic world. Female slaves were used as nurses in Saudi Arabia, a profession which was equated with prostitution.

A British report from 1934 described the price of a "town-trained" marriageable girl at the Saudi market as 150 in gold 1931, but 50 in 1934, because of the depression.

The ratio of female slaves had always been higher than male slaves in the Muslim world, which is reflected in the number of male and female slaves: when slavery was banned in 1962, sixty percent of those slaves officially registered as liberated by the reform were female.

=== Male slaves ===
Slave labor is described in the territory of modern Saudi Arabia for centuries. In the 8th century, slave labor was used in the mines of Asir, and in the 11th century, slaves performed manual labor in the oasis of Al-Ahsa. During the Middle Ages, the first aghawat, eunuchs of Indian, Byzantine (Greek) and African heritage are noted as the guards of the grave of Prophet Muhammed in Medina.

The Kingdom of Hejaz had many slaves, since free wage laborers were rare: in 1930, ten percent of the population of Mecca were estimated to have been slaves. Many slaves were used as domestic house slaves and harem eunuchs, but they could also be exploited as craftsmen, seamen, pearl divers, fishermen, agricultural laborers, herdsmen, camel drivers, water carriers, porters, washer women, cooks, shop assistants, business managers, retainers and officials of Emirs. Slaves were seen as a good investment and were popular as servants, because they lacked loyalty ties to other clans in the strict clan system.

Raoul du Bisson was traveling down the Red Sea in the 1860s when he saw the chief black eunuch of the Sharif of Mecca being brought to Constantinople for trial for impregnating a Circassian concubine of the Sharif Abd Allah Pasha ibn Muhammad and having sex with his entire harem of Circassian and Georgian women. The chief black eunuch was not castrated correctly, and was thus still able to impregnate women; the women were drowned as punishment. (Note: Abd Allah Pasha ibn Muhammad was the Sharif of Mecca during Raoul du Bisson's time in the Red Sea in 1863–5.) 12 Georgian women were shipped to replace the drowned concubines.

Upper-class Arab children, such as the royal princes, were gifted their own personal child slaves who grew up with them and became their bodyguards or servants as adults. One such instance was that of Said el Feisal, who was enslaved at the age of eight and given to the young Crown Prince Faisal; at the age of 20, he became Faisal's executioner. In 1963, Said el Feisal was interviewed by the British journalist John Osman and related about his first execution: "I cut through the man's torso by mistake and went mad when I saw the blood, and I could not get the sword out", and that after having severed 150 heads, he was consumed by "bad dreams."

The king himself was estimated to be the biggest slave owner with a number of around 3,000 slaves, among them the royal bodyguard who they described as "arrogant, well provided with food, clothes and even money", who formed a "striking contrast" to the free Arab citizens; the king normally did not sell slaves, but could give them away as gifts.

Royal slaves, in the form of bodyguards and servants were present during official meetings between the Saudi monarch and foreign dignitaries, such as the meeting between the Saudi King and the American President Roosevelt at U.S.S. Murphy in February 1945.

=== Royal harem ===
King Ibn Saud, who was King of Nejd (r. 1902–1932), King of Hejaz (r. 1926–1932) and finally King of Saudi Araba (r. 1932–1953) is known to have had a traditional Islamic harem, complete with eunuchs, wives as well as enslaved concubines, who were made umm walad when he acknowledged paternity of their children. He is known to have had a great number of consorts, but there has been different information about the exact number of wives and concubines. One source, for example, gives the number of seventeen wives, four concubines and additionally four slave girls. In addition to the consorts of the king, the harem also (as was customary for royal harems), included house slaves of the wives and concubines.

As in prior royal Islamic harems, there were women of different nationalities among the wives and concubines in the Saudi royal harem. The mother of Prince Tallal was for example an Armenian, while the mother of Prince Fahd was an Arab of the Sudeiri tribe. His legal wives would normally have been free Arab women. Ibn Saud made diplomatic marriage alliances by marrying brides from different Arab tribes. Since he could only have four wives at the same time, he regularly divorced his wives to marry new ones; this resulted in a constant flow of new wives to the harem, which made it possible for him to make marriage alliances with thirty different tribes. Aside from his wives, he had slave concubines. These women were trafficked to Saudi Arabia via a number of different routes, depending on the origin of the slave girls. Among his concubines was Baraka Al Yamaniyah (died 22 August 2018), a concubine of African origin, who gave birth to his son Prince Moqren bin Abdul Aziz in 1945.

Ibn Saud informed Harry St John Philby that he had taken the virginity of hundreds of slave girls and then given them away as presents; he told St John Philby, that he had deflowered 135 virgin slave girls and had sexual intercourse with additional 100 enslaved women, and that he had decided to henceforward only marry two new wives per year and limit himself to "four concubines, wives in all but name... and four slave-girls, to say nothing of his right to select from the damsels at his disposal". Churchill noted about king Ibn Saud in 1945 that:

"He still lived the existence of a patriarchal king of the Arabian desert, with his forty living sons and the seventy ladies of the harem, and three or four official wives, as prescribed by the Prophet, one vacancy being kept".

Ibn Saud is reported to have been the father of 42 sons and 125 daughters. The children were raised by their mothers, were named after their mothers, and their status reflected the status of their mothers in the royal harem: the sons of umm walad slave girls had lower status than the sons of wives.

The sons of Ibn Saud were also given enslaved concubines. Ibn Saud acquired many female slaves by purchase from the slave market, and is reported that when his sons visited Europe, they assumed that European women could be purchased, and that the king agreed with them. Prince Sultan bin Abdul Aziz had a concubine who became the mother of Prince Bandar bin Sultan Al Saud (born 1949) Her son later expressed that "I was conceived out of wedlock and my mother was a concubine", but that in accordance with the Islamic custom he was not considered illegitimate despite the fact that his parents were unmarried, since the child of a Muslim man and his slave was viewed as legitimate if the father acknowledged fatherhood. His mother had been used as a servant girl (house slave) before she was given as a concubine to the Prince, and her son said:

"My mother was not related to any tribal leader that would provide me with power, nor was she from a royal family." Having lived in the Asir Province of Saudi Arabia, which nestles across from Africa, Khizaran was darker skinned, a feature she passed on to her son Bandar, who is noticeably darker than his brothers. It has been a common misconception in the U.S. press that the prince's mother was African. Bandar often derives curious enjoyment from knowing the truth of a situation while the media speculates endlessly and wrongly about him, and he has made no attempt to explain the geographical background to his mother's heritage. He confessed, "I coyly let that stand for a long time, because as you know by now, I enjoy knowing something that the whole world is talking about mistakenly and I know that it is not true."

== Activism against slave trade ==
=== Before WWII ===
The British fought the slave trade by patrolling the Red Sea. However, these controls were not effective, since the slave traders would inform the European colonial authorities that the slaves were their wives, children, servants or fellow Hajj pilgrims, and the victims themselves were convinced of the same, unaware that they were being shipped as slaves.

Since the British Consulate had opened in Jeddah in the 1870s, the British had used their diplomatic privileges to manumit the slaves escaping to the British Consulate to ask for asylum. Royal slaves were exempted from this right.

The French, Italian and Dutch Consulate also used their right to manumit the slaves who reached their consulate to ask for asylum. However, the activity of France and Italy was very limited, and only the Dutch were as willing to use this right as much as Britain. The right for manumission by seeking asylum could be used by any slave who managed to reach the consul office or a ship belonging to a foreign power. Most slaves who used this right were citizens of these nations' colonies, who had travelled to Arabia without being aware that they would be sold as slaves upon arrival. The manumission activity of the foreign consuls was met with formal cooperation by the Arabian authorities but greatly disliked by the local population, and it was common for slaves seeking asylum to disappear between seeking asylum and the moment the consul could arrange a place for them on a boat.

When the League of Nations was founded, they conducted an international investigation of slavery via the Temporary Slavery Commission (TSC), and a convention was drawn up to hasten the total abolition of slavery and the slave trade. The 1926 Slavery Convention, which was founded upon the investigation of the TSC of the League of Nations, was a turning point in banning global slavery. The Red Sea slave trade and the slavery in the Hejaz attracted attention during this point in time.

The slavery and slave trade in the Arabian Peninsula, and particular in Saudi Arabia (Kingdom of Hejaz), attracted attention by the League of Nations and contributed to the creation of the 1926 Slavery Convention, obliging the British to combat the slave trade in the area.

By the Treaty of Jeddah, May 1927 (art.7), concluded between the British Government and Ibn Sa'ud (King of Nejd and the Hijaz) it was agreed to suppress the slave trade in Saudi Arabia, mainly supplied by the ancient Red Sea slave trade. In the 1932, the League of Nations asked all member countries to include anti-slavery commitment in any treaties they made with all Arab states.

In 1932 the League formed the Committee of Experts on Slavery (CES) to review the result and enforcement of the 1926 Slavery Convention, which resulted in a new international investigation under the first permanent slavery committee, the Advisory Committee of Experts on Slavery (ACE) in 1934–1939. In the 1930s, Saudi Arabia and the rest of the Arabian Peninsula was the main center of legal chattel slavery.

In 1932, Anthony Eden informed the Committee of Experts on Slavery that Britain (for reasons of diplomacy) could not interfere in slavery in Muslim states, and France criticized Britain for "allowing" (by refusing to interfere in), the slavery in Arabia.

In 1933, Saudi Arabia asked Britain to support their application for membership in the League of Nations, but despite their normal policy to avoid upsetting Ibn Saud, Britain was unable to grant the request to support Saudi membership, since chattel slavery was still legal in Saudi Arabia.

Between 1928 and 1931, the British consulate in Jeddah helped 81 people to be manumitted, 46 of whom were repatriated to Sudan and 25 to Massawa in Ethiopia. The vast majority of slaves originated from Africa, but the fact that the majority of them had been trafficked as children posed a problem for the authorities. They could not remember exactly where they had come from or where their family lived, could no longer speak any language other than Arabic, and thus had difficulty supporting themselves after repatriation, all of which in the 1930s had caused a reluctance from the authorities to receive them.

In 1936, Saudi Arabia formally banned the import of slaves who were not already slaves prior to entering the kingdom, a reform which was however on paper only. King Ibn Saud officially expressed his willing cooperation with the anti-slavery policy of the British, but in 1940, the British were well aware that the king imported concubines from Syria, had received a gift of twenty slaves from Qatar and that British subjects from Baluchistan were trafficked to Saudi Arabia via Oman.

=== After WWII ===
After World War II, there was growing international pressure from the United Nations to end the slave trade. In 1948, the United Nations declared slavery to be a crime against humanity in the Universal Declaration of Human Rights, after which the Anti-Slavery Society pointed out that there was about one million slaves in the Arabian Peninsula, which was a crime against the 1926 Slavery Convention, and demanded that the UN form a committee to handle the issue.

The UN formed the Ad Hoc Committee on Slavery in 1950, which resulted in the introduction of the Supplementary Convention on the Abolition of Slavery. The Ad Hoc Committee on Slavery filed a report on the chattel slavery in Saudi Arabia during the 1950–1951 investigation.

The British Anti-Slavery Society actively campaigned against the slavery and slave trade in the Arabian Peninsula from the conclusion of World War II until the 1970s, and particularly publicized Saudi Arabia's central role in 20th-century chattel slavery within the United Nations, but their efforts was long opposed by the lack of support from London and Washington.

The British Foreign Office's internal reports noted an upswing in the slave trade to Saudi Arabia after WWII, but preferred to turn a blind eye to it to avoid international exposure of their own Gulf Sheikh allies' complicity in the slave trade.

In 1951 the British informed the US State Department that there were at least 50,000 slaves in Saudi Arabia, a number increasing because of oil wealth, and that the US should participate in ending the slavery in Saudi, which at the time were used in Soviet propaganda, who pointed out that slavery was still practiced in reactionary Arab puppet states of the West.

In the 1950s there were diplomatic difficulties due to slaves fleeing across the borders from Saudi Arabia to Kuwait and the Trucial States, since there was uncertainty in how runaway slaves were to be handled diplomatically without upsetting the Saudis, who wished to retrieve them. Saudi Arabia normally denied any involvement in such affairs when they were questioned by the British, but one British report in the Foreign Office noted that twelve Baluchi slaves who had been returned to Ibn Saud had been executed, three of whom were beheaded in front of the Royal Palace.

The Red Sea slave trade to Saudi Arabia were still very much active in the 1950s; the French consul in Ethiopia reported of a shipment of ninety Africans exported from French Somaliland (Djibouti) to Mecca in 1952, an investigation of the French Assembly performed by Pastor La Graviere issued a report to that effect in 1955, and the British agent in Jeddah confirmed the report and noted that the prices of humans where high in the Saudi slave market and that a young pregnant woman could be sold for five hundred gold sovereigns or twenty thousand riyals.

The US Eisenhower administration sought to undermine the Bricker Amendment by a retreat from the UN, and made Saudi Arabia a cornerstone of the Eisenhower Doctrine, and therefore abstained from the United Nations Supplementary Convention on the Abolition of Slavery, the Slave Trade, and Institutions and Practices Similar to Slavery.

The British Anti Slavery Society failed to pass stricter enforcements at the 1956 UN Supplementary Convention on Slavery, but the issue started to attract international attention.

During the 1957 US state visit of King Saud, Eisenhower conditioned the construction of an American military base in Dhahran in Saudi Arabia in exchange for an alliance against communism; abolition of slavery was never part of the discussion.

During the Saudi King's US state visit in the winter of 1957, "gigantic Nubian slaves toting jewelled daggers and machine guns" protected Saud. The open display of slavery during the state visit caused a highwater mark for domestic protests against the US–Saudi partnership, including condemnations from both the African-American press and the American Jewish Congress. King Saud's "toleration of slavery" caused city-wide protests during his visit to New York in 1957.

The Eisenhower Administration did not wish to acknowledge the ongoing slavery in Saudi Arabia, but domestic American criticism came not only from the African-American press but from the national press, the American Jewish Congress, average citizens, and the United States Senate, who denounced the US partnership with the "Slave King."

The biggest domestic protests came from the African American press, who cited the report of the Anti-Slavery Society's report at the Supplementary Convention on the Abolition of Slavery in Geneva in 1956, that there were 500,000 slaves in Saudi Arabia. Louis Lautier, described King Saud as "the world's foremost patron of slavery", and the Chicago Defender denounced the US-Saudi partnership:

We deplore sorrowfully the circumstances that made it necessary to coddle in our bosom a heartless, unsympathetic, unjust [sic], the immoral monarch who is the antithesis of every single ideal for which American blood has been copiously spilled.

=== Abolition ===
When President Kennedy took office, the issue of slavery within the US ally Saudi Arabia had caused growing domestic and international attention and caused damage to the Kennedy administration's liberal world-order rhetoric and the US-Saudi partnership, and Kennedy pressed Saudi leaders to "modernize and reform" if they wished for US military assistance during the Yemeni Civil War. President Kennedy wished to strengthen the UN, which in turn also strengthened the long going abolition campaign of the British Anti Slavery Society within the UN and gave it gravitas. The Kennedy administration also experienced international pressure from influential secular Middle East regional leaders like Gamal Abdul Nasser, as well as from the newly decolonized African states, whose own citizens were the most common victims of the slave trade to the Arabian Peninsula, and whose good will was necessary for Kennedy's anti Soviet New Frontier agenda in the Global South. The Kennedy administration therefore put pressure on Saudi Arabia to introduce "modernization reforms", a request which was heavily directed against slavery.

In the 1960s, the institution of slavery had become an international embarrassment for Saudi Arabia. Both Saudi Arabia as well as the Gulf states had been subjected to more intense criticism for chattel slavery during the 1950s, and in 1960–63 a media campaign by John Laffin brought international attraction and condemnation of the ongoing slavery and slave trade in the Arabian Peninsula.

It was used as a platform of Egyptian propaganda, as an issue of complaint from the United Nations, as well as by progressive internal opposition. In January 1961 the Egyptian newspaper Al-Ahram covered the case of an African chief who fled to Libya from Mali in 1960 after having been wanted by the colonial French police for selling a large number of men, women and children on the Hajj to Saudi Arabia.

In 1961–1962, the British Sunday Pictorial published a series depicting slave auctions of Sudanese slaves in Jeddah in Saudi Arabia.

In June 1962, the king issued a decree prohibiting the sale and purchase of humans. This did not abolish slavery itself however, as was evident when the king's son Prince Talal stated in August 1962 that he had decided to free his 32 slaves and fifty slave concubines. In November 1962, Faisal of Saudi Arabia, who himself personally did not own slaves, finally prohibited the owning of slaves in Saudi Arabia.

Many members of the Afro-Saudi minority are descendants of the former slaves. At the time of emancipation, about 60 percent of the registered slaves were female. After the abolition of slavery in Saudi Arabia in 1962, former slaves were often forced to rely on prostitution to survive. Some of the freed slaves continued working for their former slave-owners, particularly those whose former owners were members of the royal family.

== After abolition ==
In 1962, Saudi Arabia abolished slavery officially; however, unofficial slavery is rumored to exist.

While slavery was officially abolished in 1962, the enforcement of the abolition was slow, and according to several reports the chattel slave trade continued for at least twenty years after official abolition.

When the Anti-Slavery International and the Friends World Committee informed the UN that there was still a slave trade to Saudi Arabia despite the emancipation edict of 1962, Saudi Arabia threatened to call a debate questioning the prerogatives status of the NGOs since such "wild accusations" risked turning the UN to a center "for vindictive, and acrimonious allegations". The NGOs, concerned over the threat, expressed their appreciation over the emancipation edict of 1962, but did ask if any countries would be helped to find their own nationals in Saudi harems who might want to return home; this was a very sensitive issue, since there was an awareness that many women were enslaved as concubines (sex slaves) in the harems and that there was no information as to whether the abolition of slavery had affected them.

In April 1964, Malcolm X visited Saudi Arabia not yet two years after emancipation, and his portrayal of racial harmony in the Arab world was a reply to the widespread criticism of African chattel slavery in Saudi Arabia from the African-American press in the US.

A testimony from 1971 reported that the chattel slave trade to Saudi Arabia still continued secretly, despite the fact that it had been officially banned nine years prior; and eleven years later, in 1982, twenty years after the official abolition, there was another testimony of illegal trafficking of chattel slaves to Saudi Arabia.

In 1971, Dr. Oliver Ransom reported that African children were still being trafficked across the Red Sea to the port cities alongside the Arabian coast and sold to the highest bidder as chattel slaves. In 1982, John Laffin reported that poor pilgrims from Africa were still illegally trafficked over the Red Sea and sold as chattel slaves upon their arrival, and stated that the slave trade had in fact become more easy when it no longer had to rely on boats but slaves could be transported by plane.

The 1982 report appears to have been the last report of the clandestine chattel slave trade to Saudi Arabia. In the 1970s and 1980s, traditional chattel slavery was essentially replaced by the Kafala system. This transition was possible since it functioned in a similar way. The slave traders had previously used the method of luring people to emigrate willingly to Saudi Arabia by offering to pay the travel expenses to Saudi Arabia to people who sought employment or wished to perform the Hajj, and sold them on the slave market upon arrival. Under the Kafala system, employment agencies used the method of offering to pay the travel expenses for people looking for employment and took the passports from people upon arrival. This method was essentially the same.

After the abolition of slavery, poor migrant workers were employed under the kafala system, which has been compared to slavery.

The global Slavery Index ranks Saudi Arabia as the fourth ranking country regarding prevalence of modern slavery, with 21.3 slaves for every thousand people.

According to the U.S. State Department as of 2005:

Saudi Arabia is a destination for men and women from South and East Asia and East Africa trafficked for the purpose of labor exploitation, and for children from Yemen, Afghanistan, and Africa trafficked for forced begging. Hundreds of thousands of low-skilled workers from India, Indonesia, the Philippines, Sri Lanka, Bangladesh, Ethiopia, Eritrea, and Kenya migrate voluntarily to Saudi Arabia; some fall into conditions of involuntary servitude, suffering from physical and sexual abuse, non-payment or delayed payment of wages, the withholding of travel documents, restrictions on their freedom of movement and non-consensual contract alterations. The Government of Saudi Arabia does not comply with the minimum standards for the elimination of trafficking and is not making significant efforts to do so.

=== Kafala system in Saudi Arabia ===
From 1991 to 2019, 300,000 Bangladeshi women went to Saudi Arabia under the kafala system. In early November 2019, protests took place in Dhaka in response to the case of Sumi Akter, who claimed "merciless sexual assaults", being locked up for 15 days, and having her hands burnt by hot oil by her Saudi employers.

The case of another Bangladeshi, Nazma Begum, who claimed being tortured, also attracted media attention. Both had been promised jobs as hospital cleaning staff but were tricked into becoming household servants. Begum died in Saudi Arabia of an untreated illness.

According to a 2008 Human Rights Watch report, under the kafala system in Saudi Arabia, "an employer assumes responsibility for a hired migrant worker and must grant explicit permission before the worker can enter Saudi Arabia, transfer employment, or leave the country. The kafala system gives the employer immense control over the worker." HRW stated that "some abusive employers exploit the kafala system and force domestic workers to continue working against their will and forbid them from returning to their countries of origin" and that this is "incompatible with Article 13 of the Universal Declaration of Human Rights".

HRW stated that "the combination of the high recruitment fees paid by Saudi employers and the power granted them by the kafala system to control whether a worker can change employers or exit the country made some employers feel entitled to exert 'ownership' over a domestic worker" and that the "sense of ownership [...] creates slavery-like conditions". In 2018, France 24 and ALQST reported on the use of Twitter and other online social networks by kafala system employers, "kafils", to "sell" domestic workers to other kafils, in violation of Saudi law. ALQST described the online trading as "slavery 2.0".

On 4 November 2020, as part of its 2030 vision, Saudi Arabia announced a reformation plan for its labor law. Effective on 14 March 2021, the new measures are meant to curb the kafala system through:

1. Mandatory digital documentation of labor contracts;
2. Dropping the stipulation of sponsor consent for exit visas, final exit visas, re-entry visas, and change of sponsor, so long as they are to be applied for after the end of a contractual term or an appropriate notice period previously specified in the contract. Other requirements may still apply in case of applying within a contractual term.

The changes are to be implemented in the Absher and Qiwa portals, both being part of the E-Government in Saudi Arabia.

In March 2021, Saudi Arabia introduced new labour reforms, allowing some migrant workers to change jobs without their employer's consent. HRW claimed that the reforms did not dismantle the abuses of the kafala system, "leaving migrant workers at high risk of abuse". Many domestic workers and farmers who are not covered by the labour law are still vulnerable to multifold abuses, including passport confiscation, delayed wages and even forced labour. Although migrant workers are allowed to request an exit permit without their employer's permission, the need to have an exit permit to leave the country is a human rights violation.

An investigation by France 24 in April 2021 documented abuses of female migrant workers in Saudi Arabia. A 22-year-old woman migrant worker from Madagascar was murdered by the underground prostitution mafia she used to work for after running away from her employer's home and buried without a coffin in al-Jubail. Due to the practice of some sponsors who confiscate the passports of migrant workers, young women from East Africa find it difficult to return home after perceived mistreatment by their employers. The women often end up falling into prostitution.

== Depictions in media and fiction ==
- The Goat Life

== Gallery ==
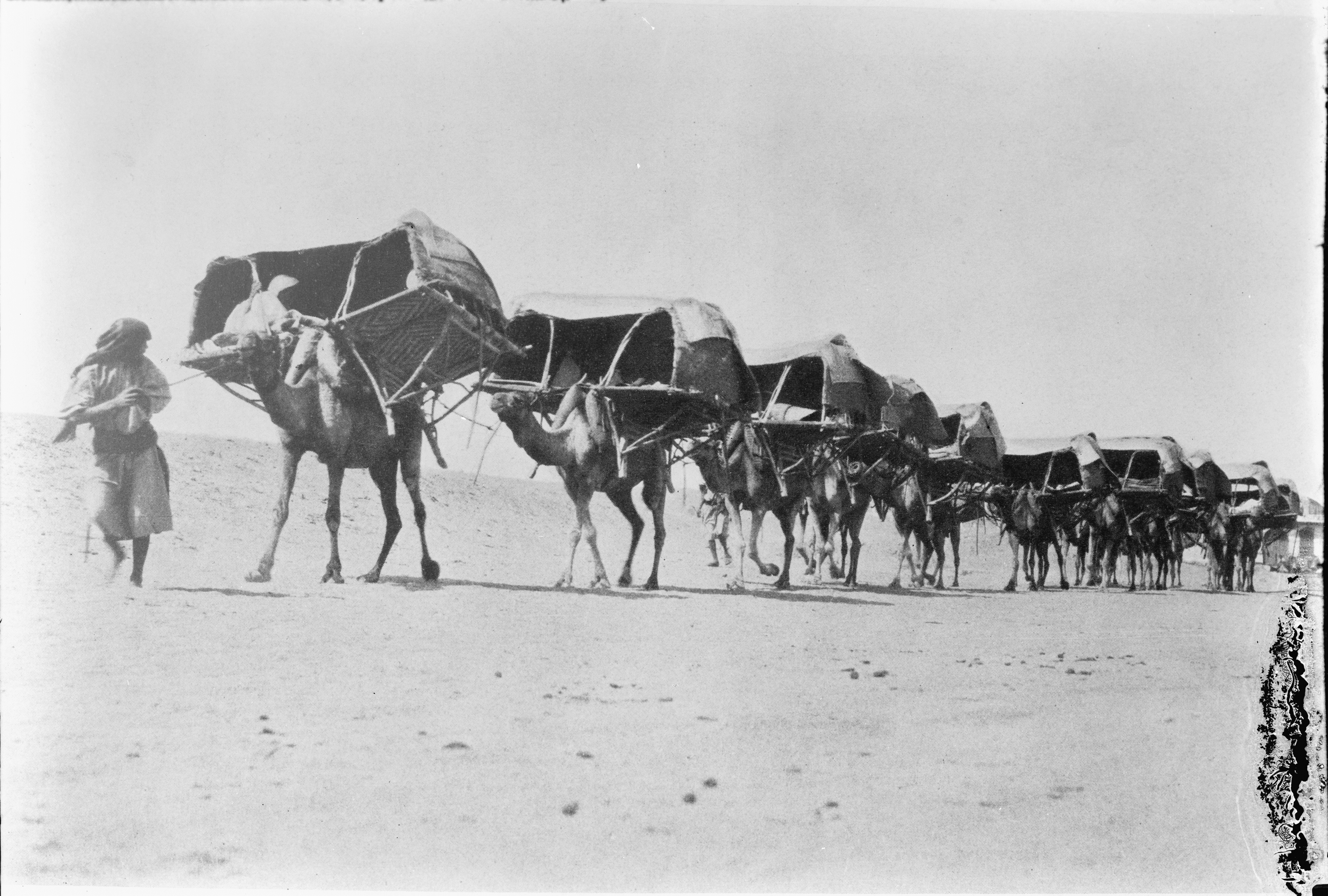
Camel Caravan to Mecca, 1910, when the Hajj was a part of the slave trade.

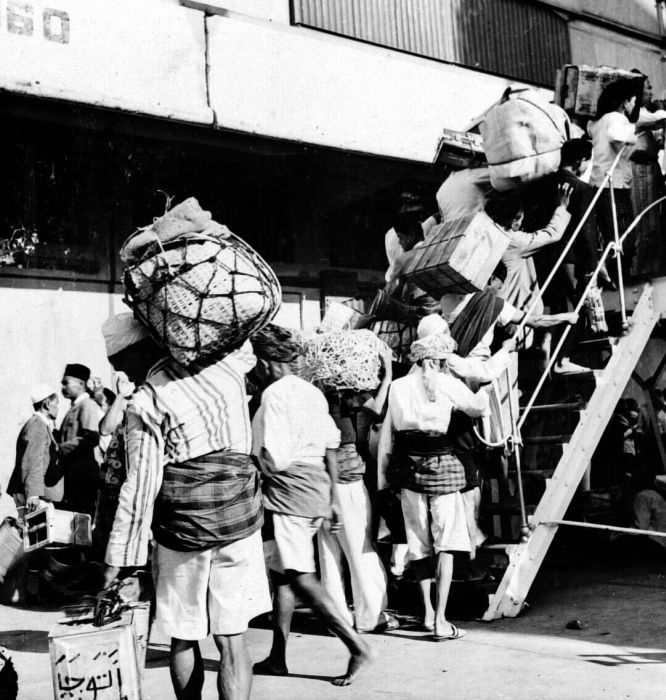
Hajj in the 1920s, when the Hajj was a part of the slave trade.

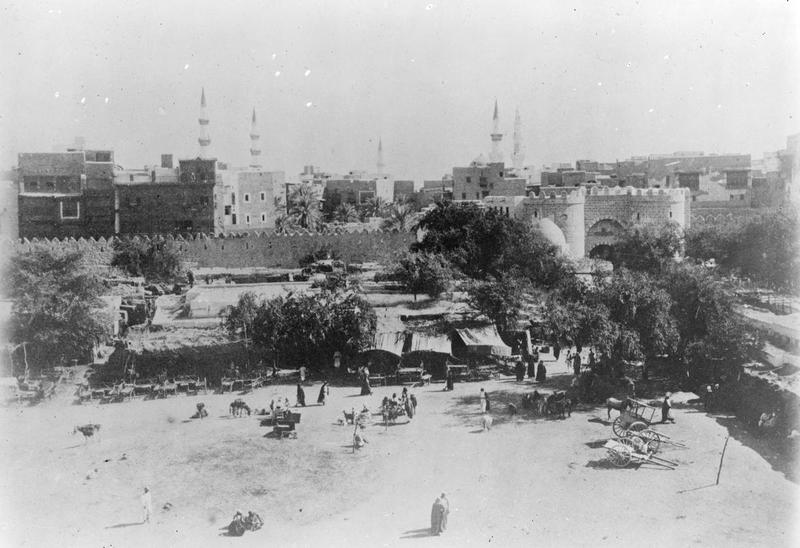
General view of Medina in 1908, when it was a center of the slave trade.

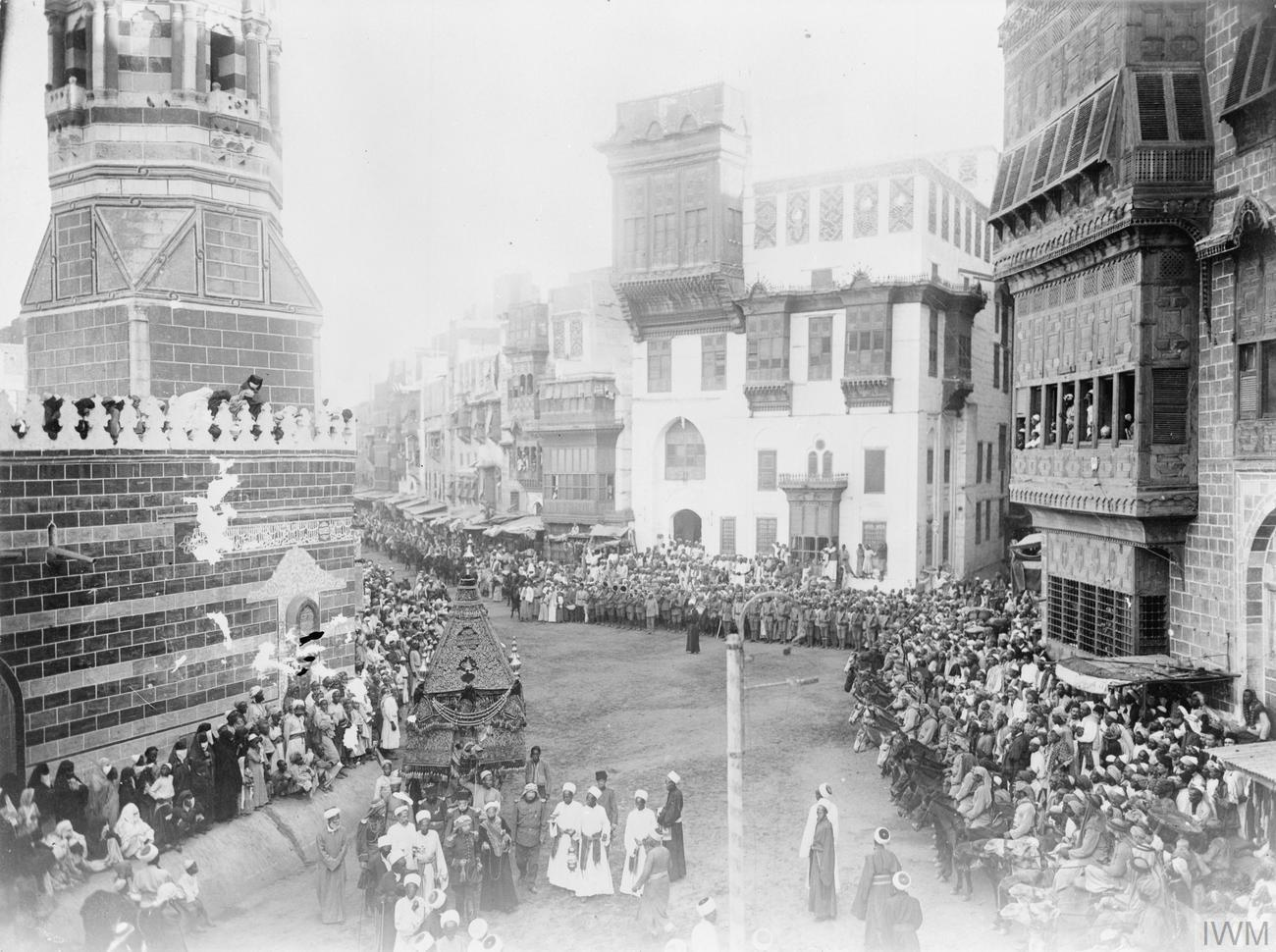
Mecca in 1907, when it was a center of the slave trade.

== See also ==
- Afro-Saudis
- Aghawat
- Treaty of Jeddah (1927)
- Slavery and religion
- Islamic views on slavery
- History of slavery
- History of slavery in the Muslim world
- Human trafficking in Saudi Arabia
- History of concubinage in the Muslim world
- Slavery in 21st-century jihadism
- Slavery in Africa
- Slavery in Asia
- Slavery in Iraq
- Slavery in Syria
- Slavery in Oman
- Slavery in Mauritania
- Slavery in Sudan
- Human trafficking in the Middle East
- Kafala system
