= Richard Gordon (lawyer) =

Richard S. Gordon is a former president of the American Jewish Congress (AJC). He was critical of Ms. magazine for refusing to accept an advertisement about three prominent Israeli women.

Gordon is also a partner in McKenna Long & Aldridge's Public Policy and Regulatory Affairs practice, where he concentrates on International and Government Affairs. During his career, Gordon has been heavily involved in public policy and strategic planning in both the public and private sectors. His significant experience has positioned him as a key national government affairs strategist, directing and managing complex strategic and policy related issues that have multi-state implications. His practice focuses on state and local government procurement, business development, and corporate and not-for-profit strategic planning. He works closely with clients to strategically position them on business, political and other policy-related matters.

Gordon was the executive director of the Friends of Mario M. Cuomo, served on Vice President Mondale’s presidential campaign staff where he focused on issues of concern to senior citizens and was an aide to Senator Claude Pepper, and worked on a number of Congressional campaigns. He also served on the staff of Congressmen from New Jersey and Michigan, again focusing on senior, social security and energy issues. In 1992, Gordon was appointed a Clinton/Gore member of the Democratic Platform Committee. Gordon is a member of the chairman’s board of Democratic Governors, a position he has held since the board’s inception.

Additionally, President George W. Bush appointed Gordon to serve on the Honorary Delegation to accompany him to Jerusalem for the celebration of the 60th anniversary of the State of Israel in May 2008.

Prior to joining McKenna Long & Aldridge, Gordon was the founder of the Gordon Law Firm, a New York-based law firm with a national practice.

In addition to his legal experience, Gordon also held significant leadership positions in the private sector. He served as President of an international results oriented strategic planning firm, assisting clients in expansion, development and marketing decisions, public policy analysis and advice on the state, national and international level. He was also the Executive Vice President of a leading publicly traded health care company and its related nursing home and medical managed care companies. Gordon sits on the board of NNC Group, a telecommunications company that provides customized, high capacity telephony services such as call center design and call routing, voice and fax broadcast, and interactive voice response technology.

He is the author of "Hazardous Waste Management Requirements in Indiana," which appeared in the book, Hazardous Waste in Indiana.
