= Naomi B. Levine =

Lawyer and university fund raiser (1923–2021)

Naomi Levine
- Born: Naomi Ruth Bronheim; April 15, 1923; Bronx, New York
- Died: January 14, 2021 (aged 97)

Naomi B. Levine née Bronheim was a lawyer with the American Jewish Congress who later moved to New York University where she became known for her ability to raise funds for the university.

== Early life ==
Levine was born in Bronx, New York in 1923 and grew up their. She went to Hunter College High School and then Hunter College. Her early career goals were to teach, but a lisp caused her to fail an oral exam so she decided to pursue a career in law, which she started by attending Columbia Law School.

== Career ==
Following law school, Levine took a job at the American Jewish Congress where her work included serving as the lead of the Commission on Urban Affairs; in this role she coordinated discussion about the relations between Black and Jewish communities, and presented positions regarding quotas and hiring. Concurrently with her job at the American Jewish Congress, Levine was a professor at John Jay College of Criminal Justice.

From 1955 until 1971, Levine ran a girls camp in the Adirondacks of New York, Camp Greylock for Girls. At the camp the girls were expected to read The New York Times and have knowledgeable conversations about current events. Levine closed the camp in 1971 when she became executive director of the American Jewish Congress, a position she started in 1972.

In her position as executive director of the American Jewish Congress, Levine worked on integration, women's rights, and affirmative action programs.

In 1978 she moved to New York University where she first worked on public relations and government relations, initially a minor portion of her job involved for New York University. While at New York University she became known for her ability to raise funds, which included the $1billion dollars raised by the university to rebuild its status in academic circles. Levine also wrote a book on the British politician Edwin Montagu that was published in 1991.

Levine died on January 14, 2021.

== Selected publications ==
- Levine, Naomi B. (1991). Politics, religion, and love : the story of H.H. Asquith, Venetia Stanley, and Edwin Montagu, based on the life and letters of Edwin Samuel Montagu. New York: New York University Press. ISBN 0-8147-5057-5. OCLC 22906872.

== Personal life ==
She married Leonard Levine in 1948.
