= Aaron M. Ashinsky =

American rabbi

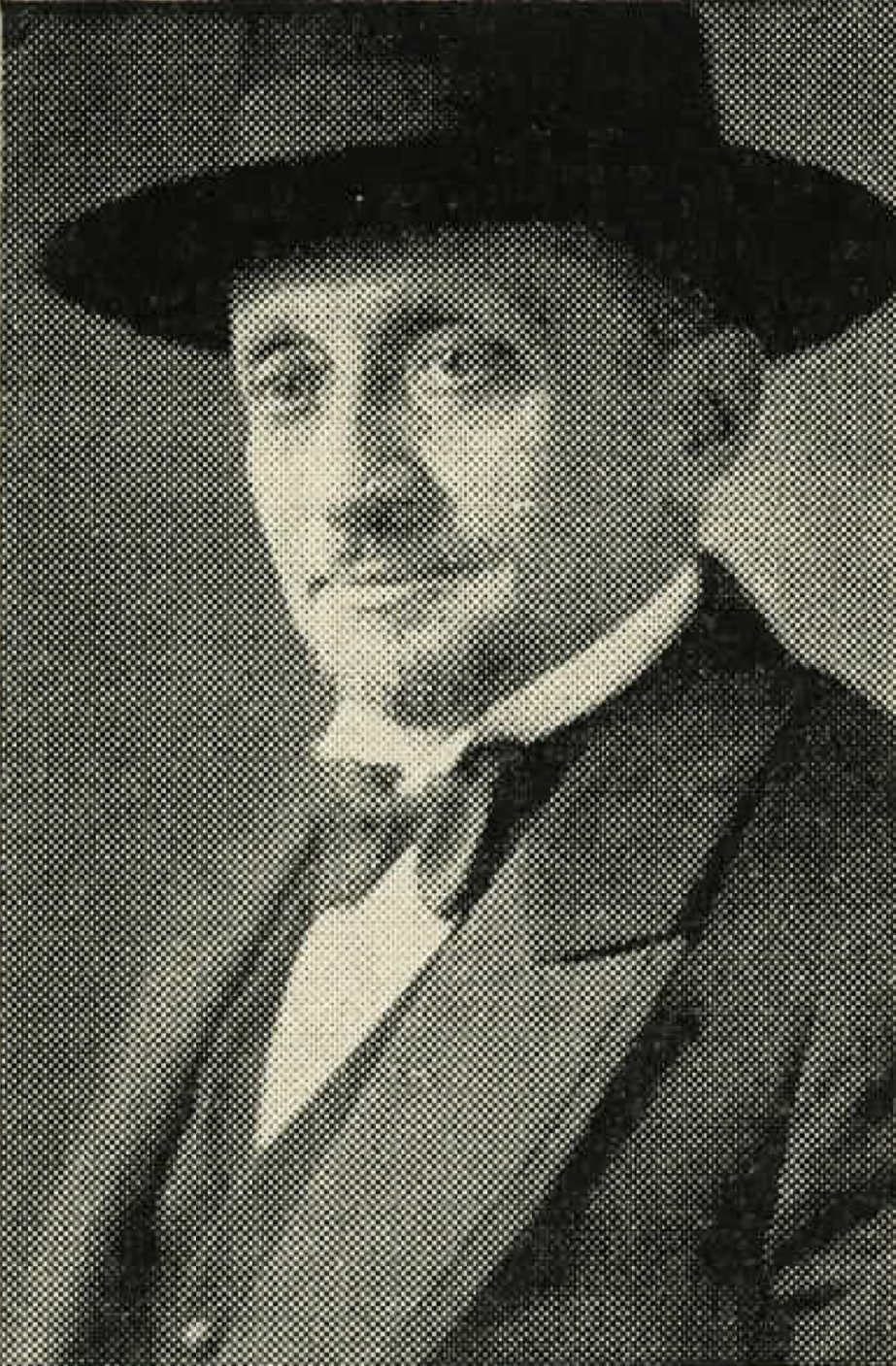

Personal life
- Born: February 1866 Rajgród, Congress Poland
- Died: 2 April 1954 (aged 88) Squirrel Hill, Pennsylvania
- Spouse: Pearl Drob (m. 1884)

Religious life
- Religion: Judaism

Aaron Mordecai Ashinsky (February 1866 – April 2, 1954) was a Polish-born American rabbi. He spent most of his career in Pittsburgh, Pennsylvania.

== Life ==
Ashinsky was born in February 1866 in Rajgród, Poland, the son of Nachman Ashinsky and Hannah Friedman.

Ashinsky studied with Rabbi Idel Drob in Rajgród and Graiva, Rabbi Eliezer Simcha Rabinowitz of Łomża, and Rabbi Chaim Leib of Stawiski. He was ordained a rabbi in 1886, and later that year he immigrated to America. He was rabbi of the Beth Israel Congregation in Syracuse, New York from 1887 to 1889, the Orthodox Jewish community of Detroit, Michigan from 1889 to 1896, and the B'nai Jacob Congregation of Montreal, Canada from 1897 to 1901. He studied medicine at the Detroit School of Medicine for two years, and while in Montreal he was chaplain to Jewish prisoners and organized the first Zionist society in Canada.

By then, Rabbi Idel Drob, Ashinsky's father-in-law and former teacher, lived in Pittsburgh, Pennsylvania. When Drob died in 1901, Ashinsky agreed to move to Pittsburgh and became rabbi of the Orthodox synagogues Congregation Beth Hamedrosh Hagodol and Beth Jacob. He established the first Sunday Hebrew Bible classes in the city, later helped develop a school at Beth Hamedrosh Hagodol that enrolled several hundred children, and taught classes for men. Interested in public welfare, he organized a women's society for the House of Shelter, reorganized the Hebrew Free Loan Society, and established the Hebrew Free Burial Society. In 1906, he began work on creating the Jewish Home for the Aged, which he was honorary president and a director of. Interested in bringing order to the general Hebrew education system, he helped establish the Hebrew Institute of Pittsburgh in 1914.

In 1922, Ashinsky left Pittsburgh to become rabbi of Congregation Beth Shalom in Brooklyn, New York. In response, the Pittsburgh Jewish community accused him of unfairly revoking his agreement to remain with them and convened a beth din consisting of Rabbis Philip Klein, Moses S. Margolies, and Israel Rosenberg to discuss the issue. The beth din ruled in favor of the Pittsburgh community and Ashinsky returned to Pittsburgh. In 1926, he went to Detroit and became rabbi of Temple Emanuel. There, he sponsored and enacted a State Kosher Food Law to eliminate abuses he found in the Kosher food industry and helped acquire a home for Yeshiva Beth Yehudah. In 1931, he returned to Pittsburgh to again serve as chief rabbi of Agudath Hakehiloth (United Orthodox Congregations) of Pittsburgh, which by then consisted of nine congregations in the city.

Ashinsky founded Talmud Torahs in the various cities he served as rabbi. One of the first Zionist leaders in America, he was a founder and vice-president of the Mizrachi Organization of America. He was also a founding member of the Union of Orthodox Rabbis of the United States and Canada and was active in the aid and relief work of Ezras Torah. He was a founder of the Mizrachi Zionist Organization of Canada, a member of the executive and administrative committees of the American Jewish Congress, vice-president of Keren Hayesod, a delegate to the Eighth World Zionist Congress in 1907 and the Inter-Allied Zionist Conference in 1919, and president of the Central Relief Committee of Pittsburgh from 1914 to 1924.

In 1884 he married Pearl Drob, the daughter of his former teacher Rabbi Idel Drob. Their children were Sadie (wife of Rabbi Nachman H. Ebin), Dr. Nathan, Maurice P., Ruth (wife of Louis Yale Borkon), Judith (wife of Nathan Rosen), Esther (wife of Gustave Eisenstadt), and Florence (wife of Rabbi Irving Miller).

Ashinsky died at his home in Squirrel Hill on April 2, 1954. His funeral was held at Beth Hamidrash Hagadol. He was buried in Beth Jacob Cemetery.
