= Irving Miller =

American Rabbi and Zionist (c.1903–1980)

- Born: c. 1903; Kaunas, Russian Empire
- Died: December 24, 1980; Woodmere, New York, United States

Irving Miller (c. 1903 – December 24, 1980) was an American rabbi and Jewish leader. As a leader, he was heavily involved with Zionist activities. During the years of the Nazis' reign, he took on significant leadership roles, such as being the first Secretary-General of the World Jewish Congress and being on the executive committee of the American Jewish Congress. After The Holocaust, he became president of the AJC and Zionist Organization of America. He was a rabbi at several congregations throughout the country and founded the Brandeis Hebrew Academy.

== Early life and education ==
Miller was born circa 1903 in Kaunas, Lithuania (then the Russian Empire). Miller emigrated to the United States in 1912, at the age of 9.

Miller was educated at City College of New York and Yeshiva College. He also received a B.S. at Columbia University.

Miller was ordained as a rabbi at Rabbi Isaac Elhanan Theological Seminary and served in the following congregations: Temple Emanuel in Youngstown, Ohio (1926–28), Temple Beth-El in Chelsea, Massachusetts (1928-1930), Congregation Sharaay Tefila in Far Rockaway, New York (1930-1946), Congregation Sons of Israel in Woodmere, New York (1946-1963)

His father-in-law was Aaron Mordecai Ashinsky of Pittsburgh, Pennsylvania.

== Jewish leadership and Zionist activities ==
While working at Temple Emanuel, Miller helped find the Ohio Zionist Region and became its vice president. Beginning in 1936, he served as chairman for the Long Island division of the United Jewish Appeal. He was also on the board of the American Palestine Campaign and a member of the Administrative Committee of the New York Zionist Region.

Miller was the first Secretary-General of the World Jewish Congress from 1936 to 1940. He was also elected as a member of the Actions Committee of the World Zionist Committee at their 1939 conference in Geneva. In 1942, he was invited by Stephen Wise and Nahum Goldman to join the executive committee of the American Jewish Congress.

As an American rabbi and Jewish leader during The Holocaust, he often received reports from Nazi-occupied Europe. One such report was that of the liquidation of the Warsaw Ghetto, in which he stated,

"Nazis rolled through the streets in giant tanks, leveling stores and houses and silencing the feeble guns of the defenders, in the final stage of extermination....every living soul was either butchered or uprooted and moved to some other part of the country.."

Miller was heavily involved with denazification. He was a part of an interim committee of the American Jewish Congress and specifically oversaw the resettling of Jews in Stuttgart.

On November 14, 1949, Miller was elected as president of the American Jewish Congress, succeeding Stephen Wise. A couple of years later, he became president of the Zionist Organization of America, a position he served from 1952-1954. In 1953, Miller traveled to Israel, where he interviewed President David Ben-Gurion several times. On March 1, 1954, Miller was elected as the chairman of the American Zionist Council.

== Jewish education ==
A strong believer in the importance of educating young American Jews, Miller recognized what he believed to be a crisis growing amongst American Jews of his time. “The problem,” said Miller, “was that the children learned that there was a time to be Jewish.” Thus, he founded the Jewish Center School in 1930, now known as the Brandeis Hebrew Academy and part of the Schechter Day School Network. The school was unique in that it was intended to teach a combination of both American and Jewish values and ideals. The school originally only had Kindergarten and first grades, but was expanded upon each year to include K-12. After visiting the Jewish Center School in 1936, Eleanor Roosevelt wrote,

“I wonder if many racial groups could not take a leaf out of their book, and if the result might not be far-reaching in making us understand other nations and what was drawn from them."

The concept of combining Jewish and American values is present in many American Jewish day schools and Hebrew schools to this day.

== Death ==
Miller died on December 24, 1980, in Woodmere, New York, at the age of 77. A funeral service was held two days later, on December 26.
