= Ashinsky (rural locality) =

Ashinsky Ашинский
- Village
- Location within Bashkortostan Location within Russia
- Coordinates: 55°00′N 57°11′E
- Country: Russia
- Region: Bashkortostan
- District: Iglinsky District
- Time zone: UTC+5:00

Ashinsky (Russian: Ашинский; Bashkir: Әшә, Äşä) is a rural locality (a village) in Krasnovoskhodsky Selsoviet, Iglinsky District, Bashkortostan, Russia. The population was 121 as of 2010. There are 3 streets.

== Geography ==
Ashinsky is located 27 km east of Iglino (the district's administrative centre) by road.
