= Aghawat =

Eunuchs in mosques of Mecca and Madinah

Aghawat, plural, and singular Agha (Arabic: أغاوات plural and آغا singular) were individuals who serve in the holy mosques in Mecca and Madinah. They had to be eunuchs and at least have a minimum amount of Islamic knowledge. They were stated to not be enslaved people; but instead, as free individuals who serve, by choice, the two holy mosques. Historically, Aghawat were non-Muslim slaves came from different ethnic backgrounds: Kurds, Persians, Romans (Byzantine), and Africans. But, currently, the Aghwaat left in both Mecca and Madinah all come from Ethiopia.

== Etymology ==
It is unclear why the word "Agha" was used to refer to the servants since the word exists in many languages and has slightly different meanings in each of those languages:

- Kurdish: "Agha" is used to refer to seniors and leaders.
- Turkish:
  - In Eastern Turkish, "Agha" means older brother.
  - In Western Turkish, "Agha" means master or leader.
  - During the Ottoman era, the word was also used to refer to eunuch heading the Ottoman harem, see Kizlar agha.
- Persian: "Agha" means the leader of the family.
- Mongols: The Mongols used the word "Agha" to refer to the older brother.

== History ==
The first Aghawat are noted during the Middle Ages, described as enslaved eunuchs of non-Muslim Indian, Byzantine (Greek) and African heritage, are noted as the guards of the grave of Prophet Muhammed in Medina.

Traditionally the history of the Aghawat dates back to the time of Nur al-Din Zengi (commonly known as Nur ad-Din), one of the rulers of the Zengid dynasty, in the year 1161. He is stated to have brought them as servants and protectors to Madinah after the Crusaders attempted to invade the Prophet Muhammad's tomb in Madinah. Nur ad-Din sent the first Aghawat in history, who were 12 eunuch males, and established the main conditions for their selection. These conditions included:

1. Being eunuchs.
2. Memorization of the Quran.
3. Knowing one-quarter of Islamic worship jurisprudence (Arabic: فقه العبادات, romanized: fiqh al-'ibadat) (i.e., Islamic rulings regarding the conditions and details of worshipping in Islam).
4. Known to be righteous.

After Nur ad-Din's passing, Salah ad-Din Al-Ayubi (commonly known as Saladin) organized the Aghawat and established a system in which their salaries and duties were specified.

There are different narratives regarding how Aghawat became eunuchs:

1. Some parents castrate their own children because they want them to become servants of the holy mosques in Mecca or Medina.
2. Tribes in Africa and other places would fight among themselves, and the victorious tribe would castrate the children of the losing tribe.
3. Recently, castration in East Africa was a common practice by the Italian colonists and has resulted in the existence of many eunuchs in East Africa.
4. A person could be born a eunuch. Although rare, it is possible that some individuals were born eunuchs.

Eunuchs were an active component in the slave market of the Islamic world until the early 20th-century for service in harem as well as in the corps of mostly African eunuchs who guarded the Prophet Muhammad's tomb in Medina and the Kaʿba in Mecca. Most slaves trafficked to Hijaz came there via the Red Sea slave trade. Small African boys were castrated before they were trafficked to the Hijaz, where they were bought at the slave market by the Chief Agha to become eunuch novices. It was noted that boys from Africa were still openly bought to become eunuch novices to serve at Medina in 1895. In Medina there was a part of town named Harat al-Aghawat (Neighborhood of the Aghas).

== Duties of the Aghawat ==
The Aghawat in Medina hold the keys to the tomb of the Prophet Muhammad and the keys to the pulpit in the holy mosque.

They are assigned up to 40 tasks and duties, including:

- Welcoming the king and esteemed guests who visit the holy mosques from around the world.
  - In Medina, they greet the king and his guests at the door of Salam, located west of the holy mosque. Carrying large incense carriers, they escort them to The Noble Garden for prayers, then accompany them to the tomb of the Prophet Muhammad for greetings.
  - In Mecca, they receive the king and his guests at the door of King Abdulaziz, leading them to circle the Kaaba before offering them Zamzam water.
- Changing the cover of the tomb of the Prophet Muhammad.
- Cleaning the light bulbs, and historically, illuminating candles in the mosque at night.
- Organizing the separation of men and women in prayer halls by designating specific areas for each gender.
- Using incense around the mosque for a pleasant fragrance.
- Applying perfumes around the mosque.

== Numbers of the Aghawat ==
Throughout history, the number of Aghawat has not remained constant. During the time of Nur ad-Din, there were 12 Aghawat; during the era of Saladin, there were 24, and the count fluctuated over time. It reached a peak of 120 Aghawat in the year 1763 in Medina under Ottoman rule. In 2014, there were 8 Aghawat in Medina. In 2021, the number has decreased to 3 Aghawat in Medina and the same number in Mecca.

== Ending of the Aghawat system ==
The Red Sea slave trade became gradually more suppressed during the 20th-century, and Slavery in Saudi Arabia was abolished in 1962. In 1979, the last Agha was appointed. Around that time, the Grand Mufti of Saudi Arabia, Ibn Baz, received information that the Aghawat were often castrated by their parents to have them serve in the holy mosques. Ibn Baz advised King Fahad bin Abdulaziz to halt the recruitment of more Aghawat, stating that castrating children is contrary to Islam. King Fahad accepted the advice of Ibn Baz, and the Aghawat system was ended. In 1990 seventeen eunuchs remained.
