= Medina slave rebellion =

Date	142 AH / 763 AD
Location	Medina
Result	Abbasid victory

Belligerents
Abbasid Caliphate	Slaves of Medina

Commanders and leaders
Abdullah bin Al-Rabi' Al-Harithi	Wathiq (executed); Ya'qil (executed)

Medina slave rebellion was a rebellion which took place in Medina in 763 AD. The rebellion was led by African slaves in Medina who rebelled against the abuse and corruption of the Abbasid Governor Abdullah bin Al-Rabi' Al-Harithi. It was a significant rebellion which ended with the defeat of the slave rebels after the troops of the governor managed to kill the leader of the slaves.

== Background ==
After Caliph Al-Mansur crushed the Nafs Al-Zakiyya revolt in Medina and his army succeeded in killing him on Ramadan 14, 145 AH (December 5, 762 CE), Abdullah ibn Al-Rabi' Al-Harithi assumed the governorship of Medina, arriving on Shawwal 25, 145 AH (January 15, 763 CE). The context of the narratives indicates his intention to carry out a punitive campaign as punishment for the city's residents' revolt, some of whom had rallied around Nafs Al-Zakiyya, with the aim of breaking their morale. His soldiers began to corrupt and assault the city's residents, some of whom would buy goods without paying, and would even draw their swords in the face of a merchant. A delegation from the city's residents went to Ibn Al-Rabi' to complain, but he rebuked them, insulted them, and ignored them. This only increased the soldiers' corruption, leading to the looting of goods from the market.

== History ==
The rebellion took place after the occupation of Medina by the troops of the newly established Abbasid caliphate after the rebellion of Muhammad al-Nafs al-Zakiyya. The African slaves of Medina rebelled against the Abbasid troops in Medina, hunted them out of the city and barricaded themselves in the market place of the city.

Eventually, the troops of the governor managed to kill the leaders of the slave rebels. Negotiations was conducted between the Abbasids and the slave rebels under mediation from the local authorities of Medina. The slave rebels was finally obliged to surrender.
