= American Jewish Congress =

American nonprofit organization

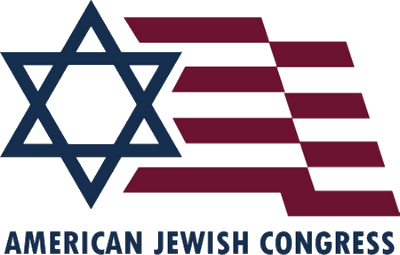
- Founded: 1918; 108 years ago
- Registration no.: 13-1679610 (EIN)
- Purpose: American Jews organized to defend Jewish interests at home and abroad through public policy advocacy - using diplomacy, legislation, and the courts.
- Headquarters: New York City, U.S.
- President: Daniel Rosen
- Chairman: Jack Rosen
- Vice President: Munr Kazmir
- Secretary: Ben Chouake
- Website: www.ajcongress.org

The American Jewish Congress (AJCongress) is an association of American Jews organized to defend Jewish interests in the US and internationally through public policy advocacy, using diplomacy, legislation, and the courts.

== History ==
The idea for an American Jewish Congress was first proposed on August 30, 1914, by Bernard G. Richards. Leaders within the American Jewish community, consisting of Jewish, Zionist, and immigrant community organizations, convened the first AJCongress at Independence Hall in Philadelphia. Rabbi Stephen Samuel Wise, Felix Frankfurter, U.S. Supreme Court Justice Louis Brandeis, and others joined to lay the groundwork for a national democratic organization of Jewish leaders from all over the country, to rally for equal rights for all Americans regardless of race, religion, or national ancestry.

The American Jewish Congress (AJCongress) was officially founded in November 1918. In addition to its goal of equal rights for all, it was founded to broaden Jewish leadership and to present a unified American Jewish position at the Paris Peace Conference in 1919. More militant and confrontational than other Jewish defense organizations such as the American Jewish Committee, it represented a populist counterbalance to the American Jewish Committee, dominated by the wealthy and conservative German-Jewish establishment.

It has established a "reputation for being politically liberal." It protested the Nazi regime.

Post World War II, it made "its mark as an active litigant on church-state issues and civil rights".

=== 1930s ===
AJCongress became effective as a pressure group in 1928 under the leadership of Rabbi Stephen Samuel Wise, who remained president and chief spokesperson until his death in 1949. Throughout the 1930s, Wise was vocal in his warnings about the dangers of Nazism. When Adolf Hitler was named Chancellor of Germany on January 30, 1933, Wise organized a mass protest rally at Madison Square Garden in New York City despite strong opposition by the German government, the U.S. State Department, and conservative Jewish organizations such as the AJC and B'nai B'rith. The AJCongress continued to organize protest rallies throughout the 1930s and 1940s. In August 1933, the AJCongress led a general boycott of German goods.

In 1934, Daniel Marks was named head of the AJCongress. He traveled to Germany and brought 5,000 Jews to America.

In 1936, the AJCongress was instrumental in establishing the World Jewish Congress (WJC). Maintaining his position as president of the AJCongress, Rabbi Wise was also elected president of the WJC. During World War II, the AJCongress acted as a liaison between the U.S. government and the WJC on issues relating to rescue attempts made on behalf of European Jews.

=== 1940s and 1950s ===
In August 1942, Rabbi Wise received a cable from Gerhart Riegner, the WJC representative in Switzerland. Riegner reported that the Nazis had planned, and were implementing, a policy to exterminate all of European Jewry; the cable also referred specifically to the Auschwitz-Birkenau concentration camp. After the U.S. State Department confirmed the accuracy of the information in the cable, now known as the Riegner Telegram, the AJCongress convened a Joint Emergency Committee.

The AJCongress supported Zionism and cultural pluralism. Its leadership overlapped with that of the Zionist Organization of America (ZOA). As a result, the two organizations agreed to concentrate on different tasks during the war. The AJCongress dedicated itself to rescuing European Jews, while the ZOA worked to establish a Jewish state in Palestine. This arrangement continued after the war, although its significance decreased after the creation of the State of Israel in 1948.On November 14, 1949, Rabbi Irving Miller was elected as president of the AJCongress, succeeding Wise.

=== After the war ===
After World War II, middle-class Jews of Eastern European descent with socialist-labor and professional civil rights backgrounds began to take over leadership roles in the Jewish community. In contrast to the previous approach to placate the WASP elite in America, these leaders were eager and willing to join the public battle for Jewish civil rights. Unlike other Jewish organizations such as the American Jewish Committee and the ADL, AJC preferred a more direct approach to addressing antisemitism through litigation and lobbying for legal change.

=== Civil rights movement ===
Stanley Levison, a close friend and advisor to Martin Luther King Jr., served on the Manhattan board of the AJC. The two men met when Levinson began fundraising for the Montgomery bus boycott in 1956.

In January 1957, King Jr. reached out to the AJC's then-president, Israel Goldstein, looking to broaden support for the Southern Negro Leaders Conference. In response, Goldstein publicly condemned the bombing of Black churches and parsonages that same month. In 1958, King Jr. was invited by Levison to speak to the AJC's Miami conference — one of the few anti-segregationist organizations to convene in the South — and highlighted the shared impact of racism and segregation upon Blacks and Jews alike.

Rabbi Joachim Prinz (1902–88) was president of the Congress from 1958 to 1966, emphasized the shared commitment to justice among diverse communities — most notably in his speech at the historic March on Washington for Jobs and Freedom in 1963, delivered just before King's iconic "I Have a Dream" address.

=== 1960s ===
The AJCongress also supported coalition politics, legislative reform, and litigation as a means of bolstering a sense of Jewish identity and community. In order to further these goals, the AJCongress created the Commission on Community Interrelations (CCI) and the Commission on Law and Social Action (CLSA). CCI was planned in 1944 and launched in 1945 with social psychologist Kurt Lewin as its chief consultant. Its intent was to bring action research to bear on religious and racial discrimination, and to use psychology and social engineering to combat prejudice; it developed psychological studies to bolster anti-discrimination legislation, and continued into the early 1950s.

The CLSA, chaired by Shad Polier, was the legal arm of the AJCongress and was modeled after the Legal Defense Fund of the NAACP. The mission of CLSA was "to defend civil liberties and fight discrimination against all minority groups, based on an understanding that prejudice against any group was a threat to others." One of the earliest cases the CLSA worked on was Westminster School District v. Mendez, challenging Mexican-American segregation in California schools. The brief filed by the CLSA in this case was influential in future NAACP strategies.

AJCongress lawyers successfully challenged racial and religious segregation in public schools, citing the psychological harm produced in school children. These lawyers employed civil rights and Establishment Clause arguments. Jewish judges in New York, unable to gain the support of their colleagues to end religion matching of probationers, turned to AJCongress lawyers to craft a legal strategy. The lawyers at the AJCongress proffered an employment discrimination argument, noting that judges on the court only hired as many Jewish probation officers as there were Jewish probationers. They used this argument to file a claim with New York's State Commission Against Discrimination (SCAD), which was also the first state anti-discrimination agency in the country. This claim was partially successful in that it forced judges to hire probation officers without regard to religion, but still allowed matching based on religion.

The AJCongress's involvement in legal proceedings sometimes conflicted with other Jewish American organizations. In 1966, the AJCongress joined the New York Civil Liberties Union, the United Parents Associations, and the United Federation of Teachers in filing suit against provisions of the Federal Education Act, which would provide support to religious schools. Jewish day school educators and leaders in over 30 states and over 100 communities representing 330 Hebrew day schools insisted that the AJCongress did not speak for American Jews on religious or educational issues, and was viewed by some in the Jewish community as primarily a secular agency. The president of the Union of Orthodox Jewish Congregations of America (also known as the Orthodox Union), Rabbi Joseph Karasick, said that the AJCongress "speaks for itself only and is under no circumstances to be taken as representing the American Jewish community. The Union of Orthodox Jewish Congregations of America, central spokesman for this country's 3,100 Orthodox synagogues, as well as all Orthodox rabbinic bodies and every other Orthodox Jewish body, have given full support to the Federal Education Act and deem its provisions to be consonant with the principle of church-state separation."

=== 1970s ===
Among their most important actions was their participation on the touristic boycott by American Jews against Mexico in 1975, while Naomi B. Levine led the lawsuit when she was executive director of the American Jewish Congress. This was a response to the impulse of Arab countries, the Soviet bloc, and Non-Aligned Movement countries to consider Zionism as racism in the context of World Conference on Women in Mexico City, and the following UN General Assembly Resolution 3379 which equated it with South Africa's Apartheid and was supported by the Mexican government at the time. Joint with other Jewish American organizations, the AJCongress announced the suspension of all their trips to Mexico on November 18, 1975, after 30 unanimous votes during an executive committee reunion.

In late 1978, New York State's prison system reached an agreement, brokered in part by AJCongress's then-assistant executive director Marc D. Stern, "to arrange ... TV dinners ... along with packaged breakfasts and disposable utensils" to those requesting kosher food while in prison.

In the 1978 Regents of the University of California v. Bakke case, the AJCongress opposed racial quota systems and exclusive consideration of race in college admissions. The AJCongress celebrated Supreme Court's decision in the case to strike down racial quotas in university admissions, seeing it as a vindication of their view that racial quotas were unconstitutional. By 2003, the organization's opposition to affirmative action had tempered. The AJCongress's legal director Marc Stern said at the time that "The Jewish community is less concerned about affirmative action than it was 25 years ago...We've all shifted."

=== 1980s and 1990s ===
Following its heyday during the 1960s, when many of its activities coincided with the larger Civil Rights Movement, a drop-off in its membership throughout the 1980s and 1990s ensued.

In the late 1990s and into the 2000s, the AJCongress experienced the defection of a number of local chapters, including those in Boston, Philadelphia, and Los Angeles. There were disputes over ideological issues and finances. Some of those chapters have since reestablished themselves as independent non-profits focused on liberal social and community issues. Finding the AJCongress had become too conservative, members of the Los Angeles chapter, for instance, created the Progressive Jewish Alliance (PJA) in 1999. They sought to assert a Jewish interest in the campaigns for social justice in Southern California, which has the United States' second largest Jewish population. The Progressive Jewish Alliance expanded in February 2005 by opening a San Francisco Bay Area chapter.

In 1994, the AJC along with the Anti Defamation League launched a campaign demanding that the IRS revoke the tax-exempt status of the Holy Land Foundation (HLF). In December 2001, when President George Bush designated the HLF as a domestic terror organization, the HLF was the largest Muslim charity in the United States. A federal jury later found HLF liable for aiding and abetting terrorism.

The AJCongress has since regrouped and is actively engaged in constitutional issues domestically and supporting Israel and challenging anti-Semitism abroad.

=== 21st century ===
In 2004, the AJCongress led a successful effort to keep federal funds out of Catholic schools. U.S. District Judge Gladys Kessler sided with the AJCongress, which argued that federal funds were being used to pay for the teaching of Catholic values through programs such as the University of Notre Dame's Alliance for Catholic Education. AmeriCorps argued that its funding was based on a program's secular activities, not religious teachings. But Judge Kessler ruled that the religious and secular activities were not sufficiently separated or monitored.

The AJCongress suspended its activities and laid off much of its staff on July 13, 2010, because it had run out of operating funds due to losses in the Madoff scandal. It disclosed that it lost roughly $21 million of the $24 million in endowments it had invested through Bernard Madoff and his firm, money that supported the AJCongress and its programs. The endowments supported about one quarter of the AJCongress' budget, which was $6.2 million in 2006. The AJCongress had connected with Madoff through Martin and Lillian Steinberg, supporters of AJCongress and friends of Madoff who invested with him, and Madoff became a trusted advisor of AJCongress on financial matters. The AJCongress increased its investments with Madoff in 2004, after it sold its New York headquarters for $18 million in 2003, and when the Steinbergs died they left approximately $17 million to the organization, which was also invested with Madoff. While the financial losses of the endowment were crippling, others noted that the AJCongress had long been in the shadow of larger American Jewish organizations such as the AJC and the Anti-Defamation League (ADL). While the AJCongress focused on religious freedom in America, free speech, and women's rights, donors showed more interest in Israel and anti-Semitism.

While the AJCongress had a long history of fighting aid to religious schools, the effort proved to be in conflict with Orthodox Jewish communities that were very successful in attracting government funds for students. An investigation by The Jewish Daily Forward showed that each year, tens of millions of dollars in federal Pell Grants go to yeshivas, which typically focus on Talmud study rather than secular subjects. For 2010, 63 of the 152 religious institutions that received Pell Grants were Jewish, the data shows. The Jewish schools received 53% of the $84.5 million in Pell Grant money that went to religious schools in 2010. Of the top ten Pell Grant recipients in dollar terms in 2010, six were yeshivas.

In 2013, the board restructured the organization; since then, it has been working on incorporating new missions that are relevant to modern times. Today, the AJCongress primarily focuses on the following challenges: strengthening the bond between the U.S. and Israel; combating domestic and global anti-Semitism; combating the BDS (Boycott, Divestment and Sanctions) movement; preventing a nuclear Iran; and promoting cooperation and trade between Israel and countries around the world.

Among its major programs are the International Mayors Conference, where the organization brings over 30 mayors from around the world to promote Israel back in their cities. Past participants include Mayor of New York City Bill de Blasio, President of Argentina Mauricio Macri, Premier of Taiwan William Lai, and former Prime Minister of Italy Matteo Renzi.

The organization opposes the BDS (Boycott, Divestment and Sanctions) movement and asserts that fighting BDS is not only a struggle against anti-Israel activities, but a human rights issue as well. To make decision makers more accessible to the Jewish community, the organization created the 500 Club and executive briefing meetings and conference calls with the decision makers and members of the Jewish community.

In May 2019, the AJCongress launched the "Jewish Guide to U.S Politics", a virtual resource summarizing the stances of U.S. senators and candidates in the 2020 U.S. presidential race on issues related to the American Jewish community and Israel. The AJCongress also created the Club 500, an executive speaking series which connects decision makers from around the world with members of the Jewish community via phone briefings.

In 2019, the AJCongress spent 32.1% of its expenses on programs and 60.4% on administration, scoring 24% for its financial accountability.

== First Amendment ==
The AJ Congress has been involved in hundreds of civil rights and religious freedoms cases before local and federal courts and the United States Supreme Court. Brown v. Board of Education gave the AJCongress its public entrée into the field of Constitutional defense agencies.

The group advocates for removing religious symbols from public life, and thus filed a brief against allowing public displays of the menorah during Hanukkah in County of Allegheny v. ACLU.

== Women's issues ==
The AJC founded its Women's Division in 1933. It operated for approximately fifty years before it was discontinued as a separate section; the organization subsequently continued its support for women's rights and feminist perspectives under the auspices of the Commission for Women's Equality (CWE), which was established in 1984.

The CWE has turned its attention to the ethical, legal, and medical issues arising from research revealing that Ashkenazi Jewish women have higher-than-average frequencies of gene mutations predisposing them to breast and ovarian cancer.

In 1988, AJCongress hosted "The First International Jewish Feminist Conference: The Empowerment of Women" in Israel to address women's rights. More than 600 Jewish women from around the world attended, including former Congresswoman Bella Abzug and Betty Friedan. Some of the attendees visited the Kotel (Western Wall), Torah in hand and found that they were not allowed to pray in their fashion because of Orthodox restrictions on women wearing religious items, singing or reading Torah. A movement began, now known around the world as Women of the Wall, headed by Anat Hoffman. Polls show that in Israel "64 percent of the secular public, 53 percent of the traditional non-religious public, and 26 percent of the traditional-religious public support the group, Women of the Wall, and their quest to pray at the Kotel in their fashion. But their cause was unanimously rejected by the poll's ultra-Orthodox respondents", according to The Algemeiner.

The CWE most recently held a major women's conference in Tel Aviv, Israel, in May 2006, bringing notable women of achievement like Anne F. Lewis; Lynn Sherr, anchor for ABC's 20/20; Irshad Manji, author of The Trouble with Islam; Bettina Plevan, partner at Proskauer Rose and former head of the New York City Bar Association; and others to a weeklong discussion on women's accomplishment and success. Carole E. Handler was the CWE's most recent chair.

== Controversies ==
=== Anti-Communism ===
Fear of being accused of Communism led the AJCongress to dissociate themselves from Jewish Communists and leftists during the Second Red Scare. Major Jewish organizations at the time advocated their expulsion from the Jewish community, collaborated with security agencies, supported the execution of Julius and Ethel Rosenberg, and discouraged other Jewish organizations from supporting the Rosenberg Committee. In 1953, the National Community Relations Advisory Council, which included the AJCongress, released a statement criticizing the Rosenberg Committee for allegedly causing public panic over antisemitism within the Jewish community. Stuart Svonkin, author of Jews Against Prejudice, argued that the involvement of the AJCongress and other Jewish groups with McCarthyism undermined these groups' otherwise support for civil liberties. However, the AJCongress cooperated with McCarthyism to a lesser extent than the AJC and the ADL.

During the 1940s, the AJCongress strongly urged the Jewish establishment to distance itself from Jewish People's Fraternal Order and the American Jewish Labor Council. The AJCongress voted to expel both groups on June 7, 1949.

=== Ms. magazine ===
On January 10, 2008, the AJCongress released an official statement critical of Ms. magazine's refusal to accept a full-page advertisement honoring three prominent Israeli women: Dorit Beinisch (then-president of the Supreme Court of Israel), Tzipi Livni (then-minister of Foreign Affairs of Israel), and Dalia Itzik (then-speaker of the Knesset). The AJCongress press release states: "'What other conclusion can we reach,' asked Richard Gordon, President of AJCongress, 'except that the publishers − and if the publishers are right, a significant number of Ms. Magazine readers − are so hostile to Israel that they do not even want to see an ad that says something positive about Israel?' ... 'Clearly Ms. has changed a great deal from the days when AJCongress members and leaders of the AJCongress' Commission for Women's Equality − including Betty Friedan, Bella Abzug and Ms. co-founder Letty Pogrebin − were at the forefront of the Women's Movement that led to the creation of Ms. Magazine.'"

Katherine Spillar, executive editor of Ms. magazine, responded to the AJCongress on Ms. magazine's website, denying an anti-Israel bias, stating that: "Ms. Magazine has been criticized for not running an ad submitted by the American Jewish Congress (AJCongress) featuring the photographs of three prominent Israeli women leaders with the statement 'This is Israel.'" She argued that the proposed advertisement was inconsistent with the magazine's policy to accept only "mission-driven advertisements from primarily non-profit, non-partisan organizations", suggesting that the advertisement could have been perceived "as favoring certain political parties within Israel over other parties, but also with its slogan 'This is Israel,' the ad implied that women in Israel hold equal positions of power with men." Spillar stated that the magazine had "covered the Israeli feminist movement and women leaders in Israel ... eleven times" in the last four years.

== Religion and the Public Schools: A Summary of the Law ==
The AJCongress, which had already been publishing Religion and the Public Schools: A Summary of the Law with the name of attorney Marc D. Stern on the cover, adapted it to a "looseleaf form and expanding its distribution" in 1993. Stern served as assistant executive director of AJCongress and subsequently became general counsel of the AJC.

== See also ==
- Congress Weekly
- Lillie Shultz
