= Slavery in Palestine =

Slavery in the Middle East

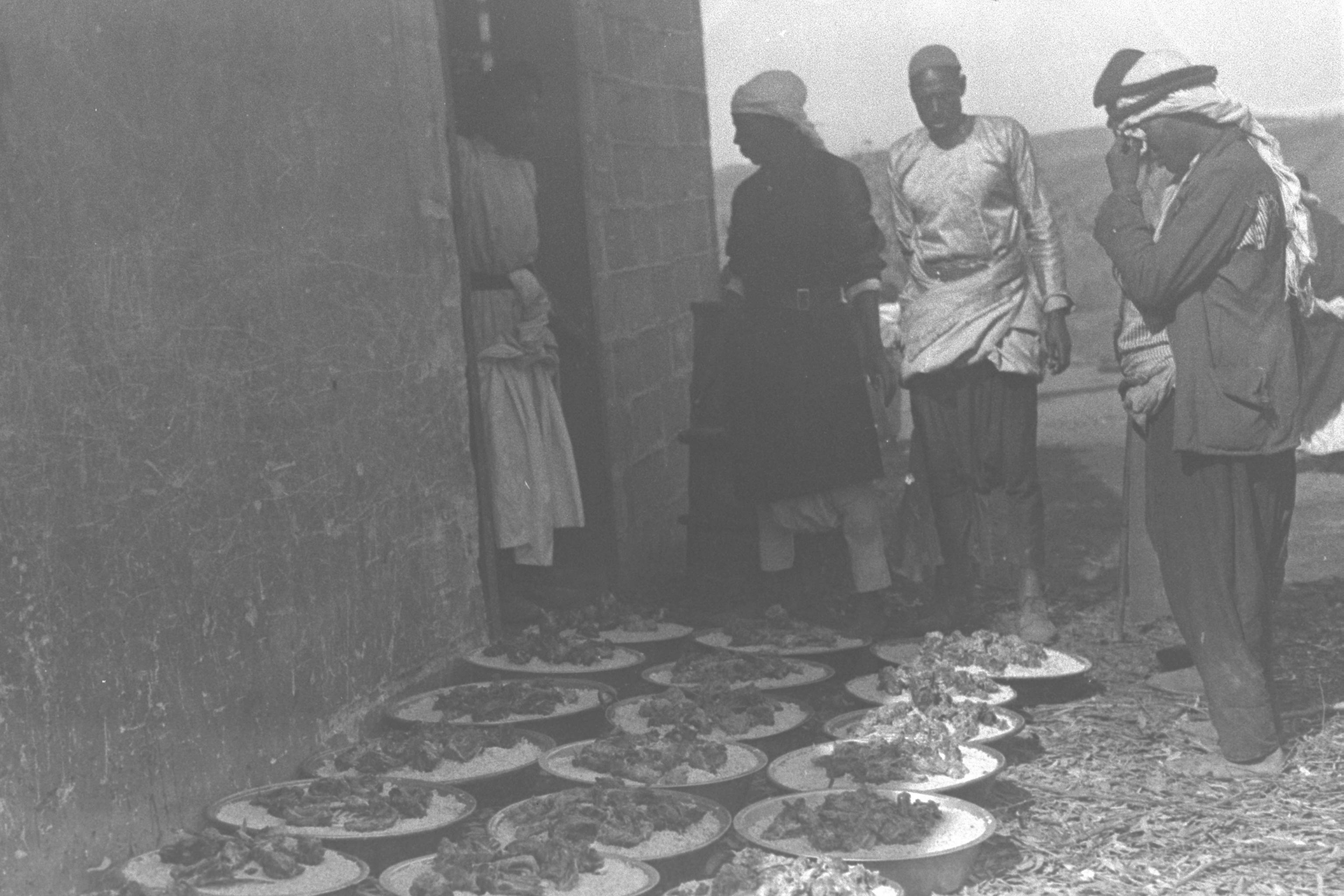
African servants waiting to serve bowls of rice and roast lamb to guests attending an Arab farmer's wedding in the Negev, 1933. מנות אוכל של אורז ובשר מוכן להגשה לא

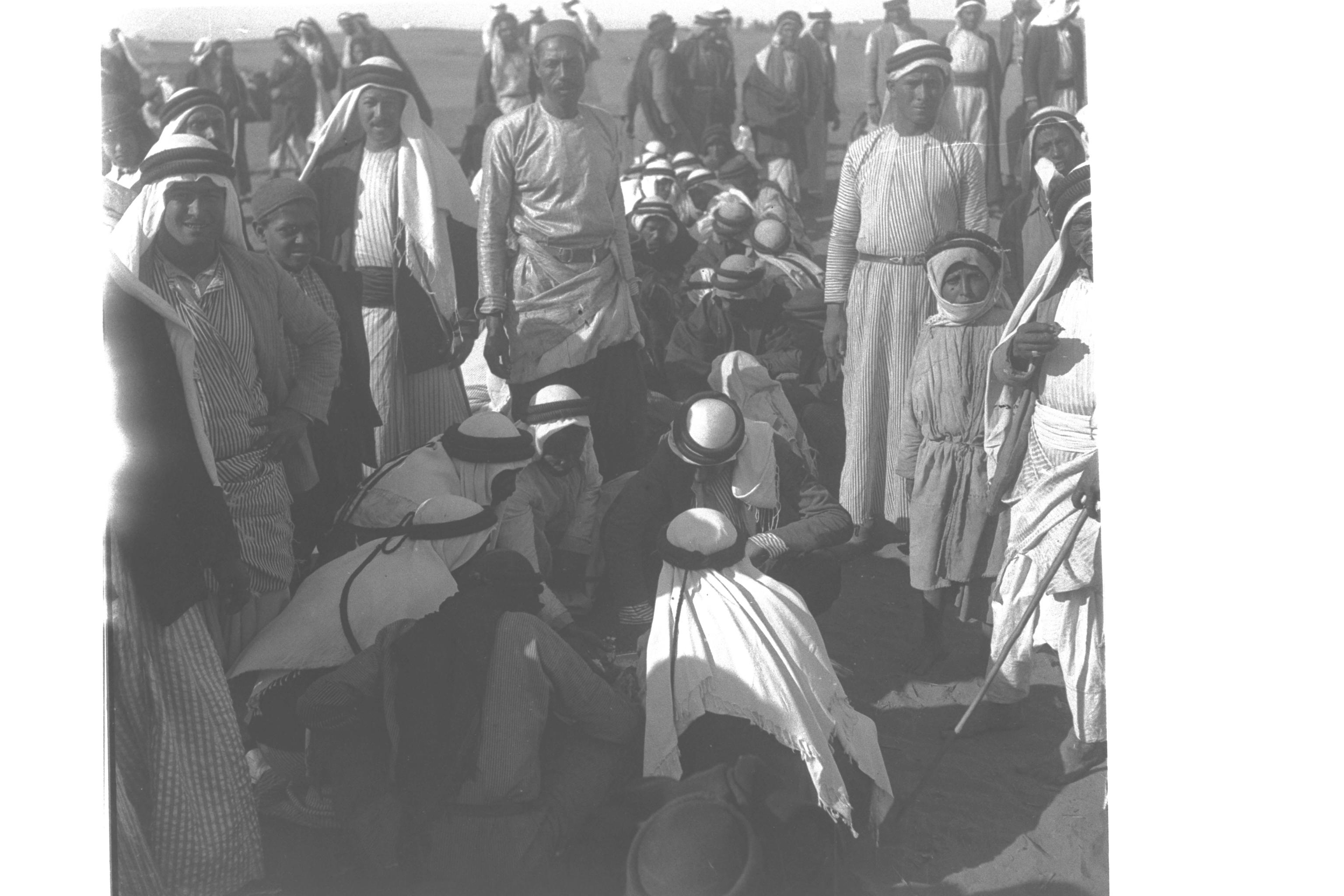
The male members of the young couple's families eating the leftovers of the meal served at the wedding of two bedouins in the Negev. Black servants can be seen in the photo. בדואים אורחי החתן

Open chattel slavery existed in the region of Palestine until the 20th century. The slave trade to Ottoman Palestine officially stopped in the 1870s, when the last slave ship is registered to have arrived, after which slavery appeared to have gradually diminished to a marginal phenomenon in the census of 1905.

The British Mandate of Palestine was established in 1920 and officially ended slavery as an institution, since slavery was not recognized by British law. However, the former slaves and their children were not given release papers and remained with their masters, since the British did little to enforce the end of slavery, and were reported to still live in a state of de facto slavery in the 1930s. The economic and social upheaval that followed upon the creation of the state of Israel in the 1940s meant the de facto end of the institution of slavery in Palestine. Many members of the Black Palestinians minority are descendants of the former slaves.

== Background ==
Palestine was historically a part of bigger states, and the institution of slavery in the area was consequently represented by the institution of slavery in the Roman Empire (63–395), slavery in the Byzantine Empire (395–636), slavery in the Rashidun Caliphate (632–661), the slavery in the Umayyad Caliphate (661–750), slavery in the Abbasid Caliphate (750–1099), slavery in the Ayyubid Sultanate (1187–1250), slavery in the Mamluk Sultanate (1250–1516), and finally of the slavery in the Ottoman Empire between 1516 and 1917, all of which were empires in which the area of Palestine was a part of.

== Ottoman Palestine (1516–1917) ==
=== Slave trade ===
Palestine was close to the Red Sea slave trade, from which African slaves where trafficked by pilgrims returning from the Hajj, and also to the slave ports of the Mediterranean Sea, where African slaves from the Trans-Saharan slave trade were imported via Libya and Egypt. European slaves were imported from the Black Sea region in the North East from first the Crimean slave trade and later from the Circassian slave trade.

The Ottoman Empire issued decrees to restrict and gradually phase out the slave trade between 1830 and 1909, but these laws were not strictly enforced in the Ottoman provinces, such as Palestine and the Arabian Peninsula.

In 1880, the Ottoman Empire conceded to Britain the right to search and seize any vessel to Ottoman territories suspected of carrying slaves by the Anglo-Ottoman Convention of 1880. The British occupation of Egypt in 1882 seriously disturbed the import of slaves to the Mediterranean provinces of the Ottoman Empire, since a large part of the slave import had come via Egypt. The Anglo-Egyptian Slave Trade Convention officially banned the slave trade from Sudan to Egypt, thus formally putting an end on the import of slaves from Sudan. Formally, the Ottoman Empire declared black slaves manumitted in 1889.

The last official slave ship arrived to Haifa in Palestine in 1876, after which the official slave trade to Palestine appeared to have stopped. The end of the open slave trade also appeared to have resulted in the gradual death of slavery itself. In the 1905 census for Palestine, only eight individuals were officially registered as slaves. However, while no longer officially referred to as slaves, it appeared as if the former slaves continued to work for their former enslavers, as did their children.

In the last decades of open slavery in Palestine, the origin of slaves appeared to have been similar to other Ottoman provinces at the time: a minority were Caucasians (usually Circassians), but the vast majority of the slaves were of African origin, mostly from Ethiophia (Abyssinia) and the Sudan.

=== Function and conditions ===
Slaves were given tasks which were regarded as disdained and degrading to free Muslims, such as domestic servants, municipal services, industrial work, sex slaves (concubines), and farmhands and sharecroppers. As commonly in other parts of the Muslim world, slaves were preferred to free employed people as domestic servants, since they were dependent on their employer and not loyal to their clan and their own families. Slaves were owned by Ottoman officials and wealthy Muslims and Jewish families.

Female slaves were used as domestic servants in private households as well as concubines (sex slaves), while male slaves were used in a number of different tasks such as laborers, bodyguards, servants and attendants.

The sex slave-concubines of rich urban men who had given birth to the (acknowledged) son of their enslaver were counted as the most privileged, since they became an Umm walad and became free upon the death of their enslaver; the concubine of a Beduoin mainly lived the same life as the rest of the tribal members and the women of the family. Female domestic slaves lived a hard life and reproduction among slaves was low; it was noted that the infant mortality was high among slaves, and that female slaves were often raped in their childhood and rarely lived to their forties, and that poorer slave owners often prostituted them.

Women slaves were more rarely described by foreigners since women lived in harem sex segregation, but female servants (slaves) were sometimes noted in passing, such as Edward Robinson, who noted upon his visit to an Arab home in Jaffa in 1838: "Of the many females it contained, we saw none except the mother of the family, who welcomed us at our entrance, and the Nubian slave who washed our feet."

Male slaves were also known as poets to the Bedouin tribal leaders during the 19th- and 20th centuries. William Hepworth Dixon noted slaves in various tasks in Jerusalem of the 1860s, such as in his depiction of Jaffa Gate, when he mentioned "Yon negro dozing near his mule is a slave from the Upper Nile, and belongs to an Arab bey who lets him out on hire", and the servants in the coffee houses: “Enter this coffee house, where the old sheikh is smoking near the door; call the cafigeh, the waiter, commonly a negro slave; command a cup of black comfort, a narghiley [water pipe], and a morsel of live charcoal", and "Saïd is a Nubian, a negro, and a slave; and like the mule and horses is the property of an Arab gentleman, not too proud to let his people and his beasts earn money by trade."

Randal William MacGavock from Tennessee visited Ramla in the 1850s, described the custom regarding the children of the Palestinian slaves and compared it to slavery in the United States:

During our visit the subject of slavery was suggested by the appearance of a likely negro boy bearing coffee and pipes, which resulted in my gaining some information that I wouldn't have otherwise. When two slaves intermarry belonging to different masters, the owner of the man claims the male issue [progeny], and the owner of the woman the female issue; whereas with us the owner of the woman is entitled to both. Quite a strong attachment exists between the master and slave, and it is not unfrequently the case that they marry and live happily together.

It was common to manumit slaves. However, a manumission rarely had true practical meaning, since freedmen normally simply continued to live in the same servitude as before. The American consul in Jerusalem, Selah Merrill, noted in 1885 the custom that manumitted slaves in fact continued to be slaves in practice:

As to house servants it must be remembered that there is a considerable class here who have been held as slaves. They are black people from Nubia, and having been brought up as slaves and knowing no other kind of life, they, in many cases, remain with their old masters. Practically, some of them are still slaves, although they are not bought and sold; such persons get nothing besides their clothing, shelter, and food.

== Abolition ==
In 1920, Ottoman Palestine was formally transformed into the British Mandatory Palestine (1920–1948). The British Mandate of Palestine official drew an end to slavery, since the institution of slavery was no longer recognized in British law. However slaves were not given release papers and in practice remained with their masters in a de facto state of slavery, and the British made little effort to free them and enforce an actual end to slavery.

The British Empire, having signed the 1926 Slavery Convention as a member of the League of Nations, was obliged to investigate, report and fight slavery and the slave trade in all land under direct or indirect control of the British Empire. The British policy was thus abolitionist, however in reality they were reluctant to interfere in cultural issues if they feared their interference could cause unrest. In the British report to the Temporary Slavery Commission of the League of Nations for 1924, they reported that slavery existed in Transjordan but had ended in Palestine in the early 20th-century after the import of slaves had stopped. According to the British, the Palestina Bedouin tribes did own African servants called Abid, but that they now had the same rights as the rest of the tribe members and should be regarded as former slaves, and that the same term should apply to the African female domestic servants of the Arab noble families. When the League of Nations ratified the 1926 Slavery Convention, the British were expected to enforce it in their colonies and other dependent land. When the British filed a new report to the League of Nations in 1926, they stated that slavery had no legal base in Palestine or Transjordan, and that it was therefore unnecessary for the British to ban it.

In 1931, the police and the Welfare Inspector Margaret Nixon conducted an investigation on behalf of the British government regarding the enslaved servant girls of private Arab households. The result of the investigation showed that after the slave trade to Palestine stopped, the African abid-slaves of the Bedouin tribes of the Jordan Valley sold their children (primarily their daughters) as domestic servants and maidservants. After the World War I, this custom started to be called employment, upon which the girls were sold as contract servants for a period between seven and twenty-five years, and in 1931, there were about 150 such girls in Nablus and about 150 more in the rest of Palestine. It was also noted, that the Abid-servants of the Bedouin tribes in the Jordan Valley, though they were now officially called former slaves, were in fact still slaves in practice, since they owned nothing, could only marry other Abid and they and their children had to serve their Arab tribe members without salary unless they escaped to another part of Palestine. The British wished to ban the practice, but since the Abid and their daughters appeared to accept the situation as it was and not interested in protesting or changing the practice, the British preferred not to interfere in the matter. The British limited themselves with introducing the 1933 Employment of Girls Ordinance, which made all contracts stipulating more than one year of service automatically illegal.

In 1934, a report to the Advisory Committee of Experts on Slavery of the League of Nations acknowledged that slaves were still kept among the Bedouin shaykhs in Jordan and Palestine, and that slavery was maintained under the guise of clientage. During the 1940s, the creation of the state of Israel and the rapid economic and social changes led the institution of slavery to collapse.

Many members of the Black Palestinians minority are descendants of the former slaves. The community in northern Jericho have often been called "the slaves of Duyuk" even in modern times. The African Palestinians who now live in the two compounds near al-Aqsa mosque have called the area home since 1930. They have experienced prejudice, with some Palestinian Arabs referring to them as "slaves" (abeed) and to their neighbourhood as the "slaves' prison" (habs al-abeed).

== See also ==
- Racism in the State of Palestine
- Human trafficking in Palestine
- History of slavery in the Muslim world
- History of concubinage in the Muslim world
- Human trafficking in the Middle East
- Afro-Palestinians
- Medieval Arab attitudes to Black people
- Xenophobia and racism in the Middle East
- Racism in the Arab world
- Racism in Muslim communities
- Slavery in 21st-century jihadism
- Fawzia Amin Sido
- That Most Precious Merchandise: The Mediterranean Trade in Black Sea Slaves, 1260-1500
