= Hababa =

Hababa or Hababah may refer to the following:

== People ==
- Hababa (slave)

== Places ==
- Hababa, Syria, a village near Tartus, Syria
- Hababah, Yemen, a village in central Yemen
