= Zehava =

Zehava or Zahava (Hebrew: זֶהָבָה) is a Hebrew feminine given name that may refer to

- Zehava (Palestinian transgender woman), victim of sex trafficking
- Zehava Ben (born 1968), Israeli vocalist
- Zahava Burack (1932–2001), American philanthropist
- Zahava Elenberg, Australian architect
- Zehava Gal, Israeli-born operatic mezzo-soprano
- Zehava Gal-On (born 1956), Israeli politician
- Zehava Shmueli (born 1955), Israeli long-distance runner
- Goldilocks, in the Hebrew version of the fairytale Goldilocks and the Three Bears
