= Slavery in the Rashidun Caliphate =

Slave Trade in the Rashidun Caliphate

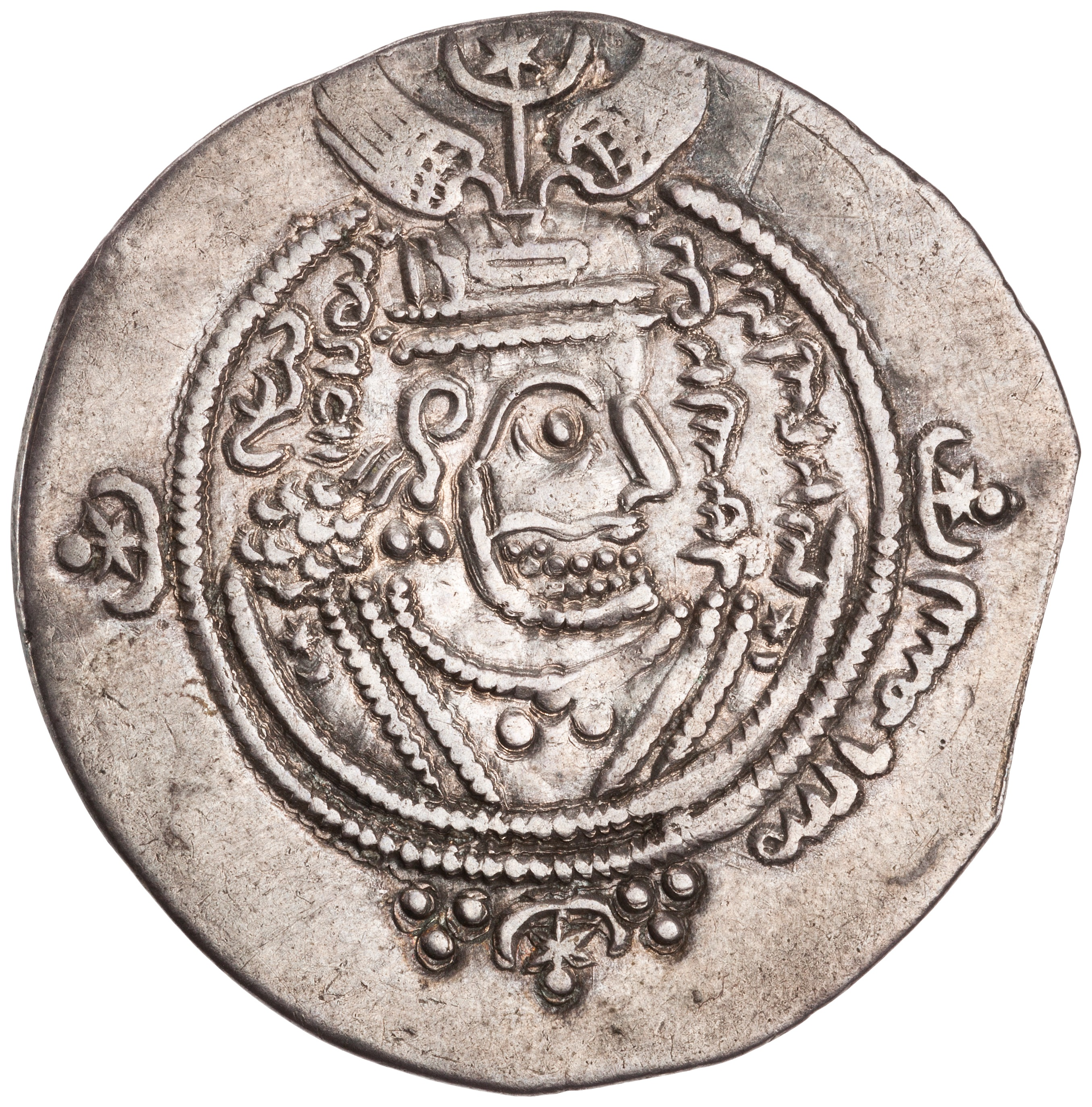
Silver dirham of Abd Allah ibn al-Zubayr 690-91

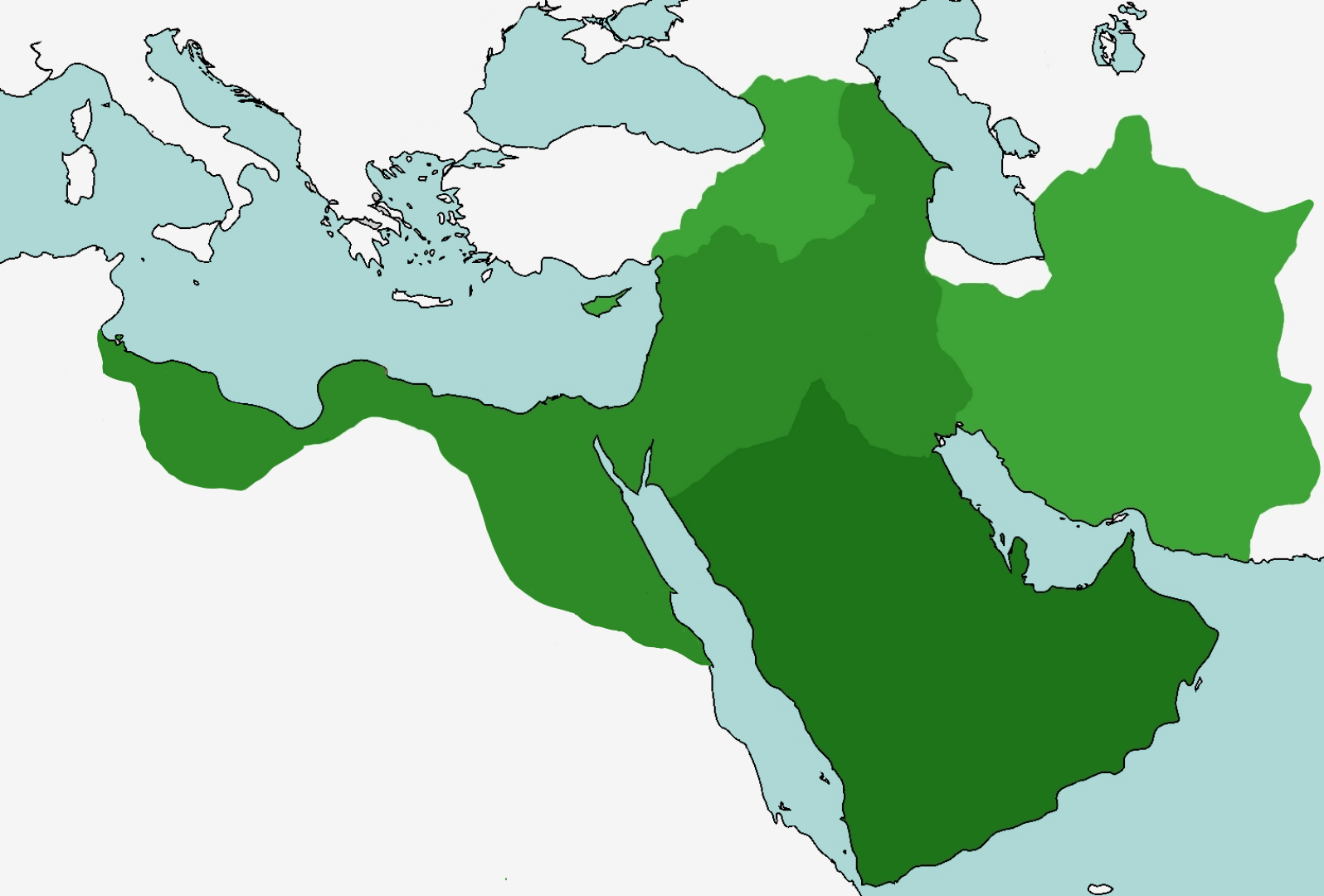
Rashidun expansion 632-661.

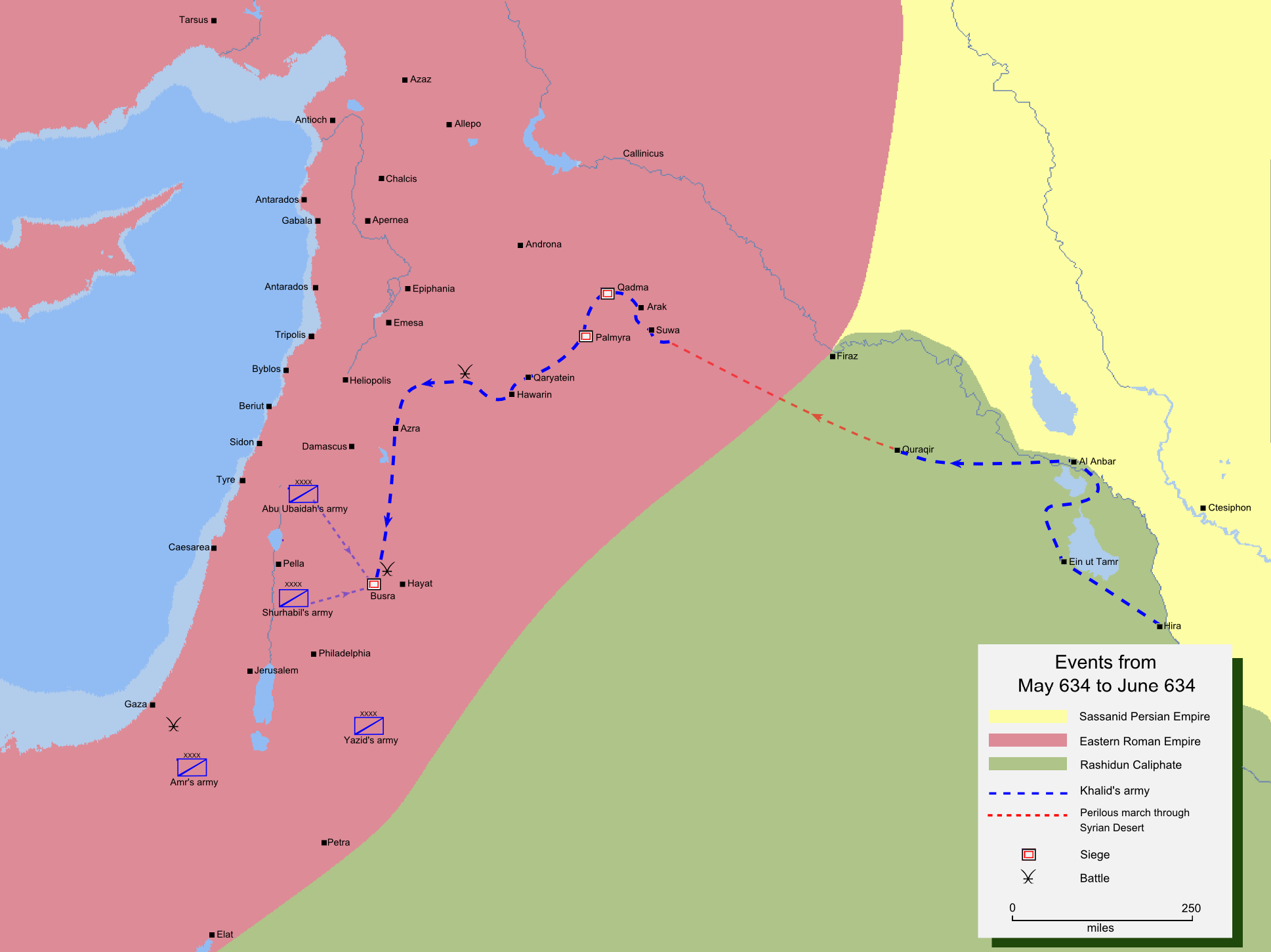
Map detailing the route of Khalid ibn Walid's invasion of Syria.

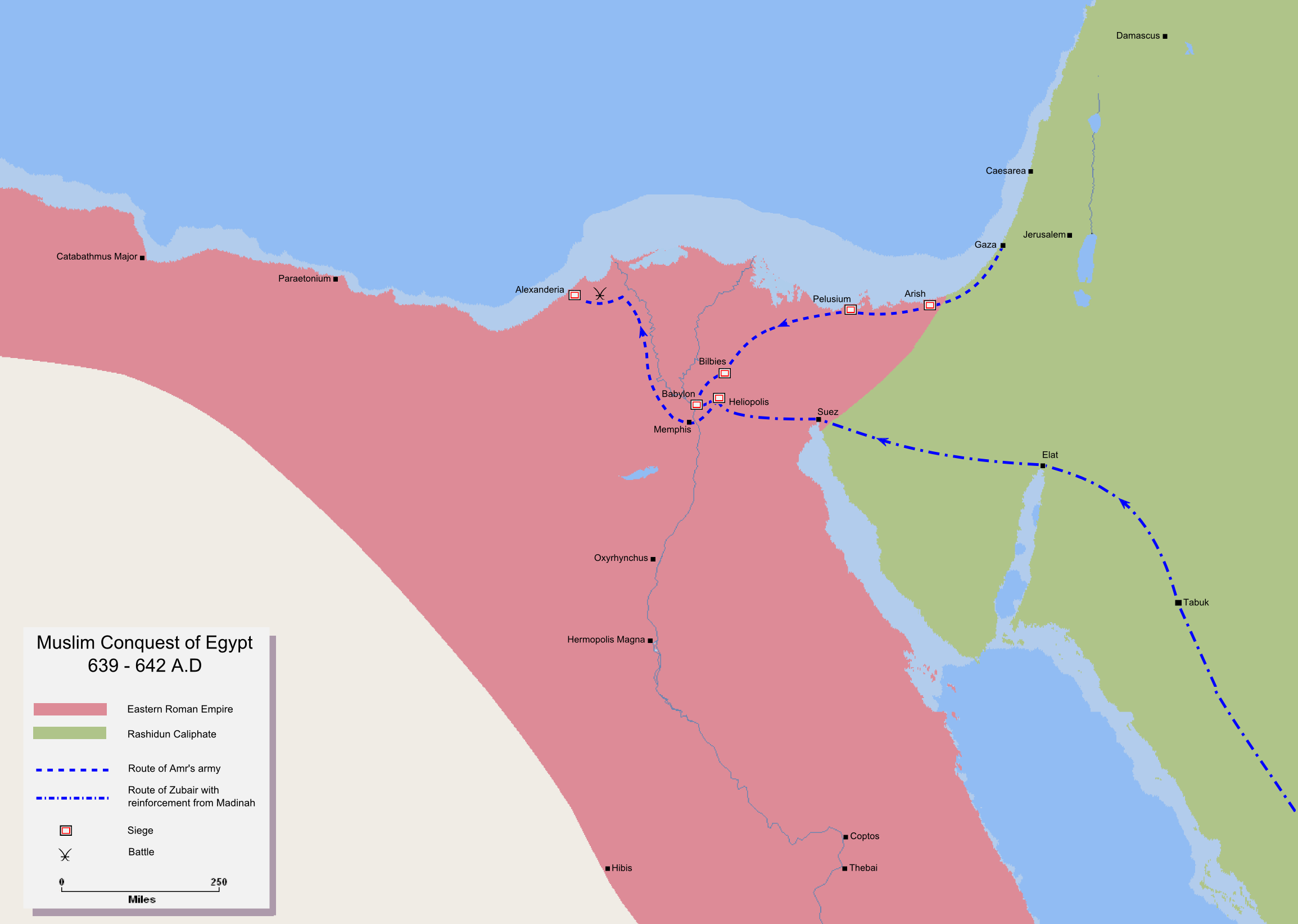
Map detailing the route of the Muslims' invasion of Egypt.

Slavery in the Rashidun Caliphate refers to the chattel slavery taking place in the Rashidun Caliphate (632–661), a period when the Islamic Caliphate was established and the Islamic conquest expanded outside of the Arabian Peninsula.

Slavery in the Rashidun Caliphate was based on the Islamic law regarding slavery developed during the preceding period as the life and example of Muhammed and his followers, which became the role model and tradition of chattel slavery in the Rashidun Caliphate and the following Caliphate.

The slave trade in the Rashidun Caliphate expanded in parallel with the Imperial Early Muslim conquests, when non-Muslim war captives as well as civilians were enslaved, and humans were demanded by tribute and taxation from subjugated people. During the Rashidun Caliphate, the regulations regarding slavery in Islamic law were enacted on a large scale and laid the foundation for the institution of slavery in the Umayyad Caliphate and the history of slavery in the Muslim world until the 20th century.

== Background ==
Slavery in the Rashidun Caliphate was built upon the Islamic law of slavery and the Sunnah of Muhammad.

Accounts about Muhammed stated that he bought, owned, sold, and rented out enslaved men and women. According to the claims of Ibn Qayyim al-Jawziyya: "Muhammad had many male and female slaves. He used to buy and sell them, but he purchased [more slaves] than he sold, especially after God empowered him by His message, as well as after his mmigration from Mecca. He [once] sold one black slave for two. His name was Jacob al-Mudbir. His purchases of slaves were more [than he sold]. He was used to renting out and hiring many slaves, but he hired more slaves than he rented out" The incident mentioned of Muhammed buying a white slave for the price of two black slaves were described in a passage of Sunan an-Nasa'i: "A slave came and pledged to the Prophet to emigrate, and the Prophet did not realize that he was a slave. Then his master came looking for him. The Prophet said: 'Sell him to me,' and he bought him for two black slaves. Then he did not accept the pledge from anyone until he asked: 'Is he a slave?"'

Among the wives of Muhammed, Juwayriya bint al-Harith was a slave who had been manumitted on condition that she married him, while Safiya bint Huayy, had been his slave before he manumitted her on condition of marriage. In addition to his eleven wives, Muhammed also had two slave concubines, Maria al-Qibtiyya and Rayhana bint Zayd. Among his other female slaves are noted Salma, who acted as midwife and nurse to his wives and daughters; Um Ayyash, Maymona bt. Sa'd, and his own old nurse Um Ayman.

The accounts of Ibn Qayyim al-Jawziyya stated the name of 39 of Muhammed's slaves, male and female: “These are the names of Muhammad’s male slaves: Yakan Abu Sharh, Aflah, ‘Ubayd, Dhakwan, Tahman, Mirwan, Hunayn, Sanad, Fadala Yamamin, Anjasha al-Hadi, Mad’am, Karkara, Abu Rafi’, Thawban, Ab Kabsha, Salih, Rabah, Yara Nubyan, Fadila, Waqid, Mabur, Abu Waqid, Kasam, Abu ‘Ayb, Abu Muwayhiba, Zayd Ibn Haritha, and also a black slave called Mahran, who was re-named (by Muhammad) Safina (`ship’)... [...] The Prophet’s female Slaves “are Salma Um Rafi’, Maymuna daughter of Abu Asib, Maymuna daughter of Sa’d, Khadra, Radwa, Razina, Um Damira..." Anwar Hekmat noted that Muhammad owned fourteen male and female slaves upon his death.

The life of Muhammad was considered to be a model for other Muslims, and many of the acts performed by him was seen as a role model for succeeding generations of Muslims. Muhammed's treatment of slaves and conduct of slavery and slave trade was not an exception to this.

== Slave trade ==
The slave trade in the Rashidun Caliphate was built upon a combination of the enslavement of war captives during the Early Muslim conquests of the Caliphate; tributary and taxation slaves; as well as commercial slave trade by slave merchants.

=== War captives ===
During the Rashidun Caliphate, the Caliphate's first wave of Early Muslim conquests expanded outside of the Arabian Peninsula and founded an Empire. The new Empire of the Caliphate expanded to Byzantine Palestine and Syria in the North, Egypt in the West and Persia in the East. The military expansion of the Empire took place in parallel with a slave trade with war captives, which expanded in parallel with the conquests, when captives of subjugated non-Muslim peoples were killed or enslaved. This was viewed as legitimate by Islamic law, in which kafir (non-Muslims) of Dar al-harb (non-Muslim lands) were viewed as legitimate targets of enslavement.

==== Armenia ====
During the Arab conquest of Armenia (636-661), thousands of Armenians were carried into slavery by the Arab invaders to serve in other regions of the Umayyad Caliphate, including their capital Damascus in the Muslim-controlled Syria.

==== Cyprus ====
Thousands of people were reportedly enslaved during the Rashidun attack of Cyprus.

Al-Waqidi, apud al-Baladhuri, described how Cypriotic people were taken captive (enslaved) during the invasion of 649: “He [Muʿawiya] took Cyprus by force, killing and taking captive, then he confirmed [the terms of their earlier] peaceable capitulation, and sent there 12,000 men, all paid from the dīwān.”

The Syriac Chronicle of 1234, drawing upon a mid-8th-century source, described how men, women, and children were separated on Cyprus by the invaders and shipped to Syria and Egypt as slaves; two Greek inscriptions claimed that the number of the people abducted from Cyprus were 200,000.

==== Egypt ====
When news of the Muslims' victory at Heliopolis reached Fayoum during the Arab conquest of Egypt, its governor, Domentianus, and his troops fled without informing the people of Fayoum and Abuit that they were abandoning their cities to the enemy. When news reached 'Amr, he sent troops across the Nile to invade Fayoum and Abuit, capturing the entire province of Fayoum with practically no resistance. Fayoum's population was enslaved, and the city was looted (the traditional fate of cities that had resisted).

After the fall of Alexandria, the commander Amr ibn al-As wrote to the Caliph: "We have conquered Alexandria. In this city there are 4,000 palaces, 400 places of entertainment, thousands of desirable European female slaves, young girls, young boys and untold wealth".

==== Palestine ====
Not only male warriors were enslaved as war captives. Thousands of civilian women and children were enslaved during the Islamic conquests. After the fall of Caesarea in 640, 4,000 "heads" (captives) were sent to Caliph Umar in Medina, where they were gathered and inspected on the Jurd Plain - a plain commonly used to assemble the troops of Medina before battle, with room for thousands of people, before they were distributed as war booty to the orphans of the Ansar.

Caliph Abu Bakr had previously given two girls taken during the early conquests as slave maids to two daughters of one of the Companions of Muhammad, but since these two slave girls had died, Caliph Umar replaced them with two girls from the slave shipment after the fall of Caesarea. Caliph Umar kept several literary boys from the Caesarea slaves for use as secretaries within the newly established state bureaucratic apparatus, since there was a great lack of people able to write and read in Arabia.

==== Persia ====
In 651, Abd-Allah ibn Amir sent an army under Rabi ibn Ziyad Harithi to Sakastan during the Muslim conquest of Persia. After some time, Rabi reached Zaliq, a Sakastani border town, where he forced the dehqan of the town to acknowledge Rashidun authority. He then did the same at the fortress of Karkuya, which had a famous fire temple mentioned in the Tarikh-i Sistan. He then seized more land in the province. Next, he besieged the provincial capital, Zrang, and, after a heavy battle outside the city, its governor, Aparviz, surrendered. When Aparviz went to Rabi ibn Ziyad to negotiate a treaty, he saw that Rabi was using the bodies of two dead soldiers as a chair. This horrified Aparviz, who, in order to spare the inhabitants of Sakastan from the Arabs, made peace with them in return for a heavy tribute of 1 million dirhams, including 1,000 slave boys (or girls) bearing 1,000 golden vessels. Rabi ibn Ziyad was then appointed governor of the province.

Zoroastrians were made to pay an extra tax called jizya, or be killed, enslaved or imprisoned. Those paying jizya were subjected to insults and humiliation by the tax collectors. Zoroastrians who were captured as slaves in wars were given their freedom if they converted to Islam.

==== Syria ====
Thousands of people were taken captive and enslaved after the Conquest of Caesarea Maritima (634–641). According to old accounts, the city was defended by consisted of 700,000 paid Byzantine soldiers, 30,000 Samaritans and 200,000 Jews, of which 4,000 were captured and enslaved after the fall of the city.

A contemporary Christian Byzantine witness from the Muslim conquest of the Levant (634-641) lamented that the Muslim conquerors killed adult men and captured the women and children and enslaved them as war booty:

"They take the wife away from her husband and slay him like a sheep. They throw the babe from her mother and drive her into slavery; the child calls out from the ground and the mother hears, yet what is she to do?...They separate the children from the mother like the soul from within the body, and she watches as they divide her loved ones from off her lap, two of them go to two owners, herself to another ... Her children cry out in lament, their eyes hot with tears. She turns to her loved ones, milk pouring forth from her breast: "Go in peace, my darlings, and may God accompany you."

Contemporary accounts speak of slave raids made by Muslim forces against non-Muslim civilians, who in Islamic law was viewed as kafirs of dar al-harb and therefore targets of enslavement during the times of conquest, and one such instant is described to have occurred outside the city of Antioch in Syria:

"When the Arabs heard of the festival which took place at the monastery of S. Simeon the Stylite in the region of Antioch, they appeared there and took captive a large number of men and women and innumerable boys and girls. The Christians who were left no longer knew what to believe. Some of them said: "Why does God allow this to happen?"

=== Tributary slaves ===
Slaves were also provided via human tribute and taxation. The conquerors could demand human captives to be given to them in the form of tributes or taxation from defeated people, who were asked to deliver members of their own people to the Rashidun conquerors for enslavement.

==== North Africa ====
Upon conquering Cyrenaica in 642 or 643, Amr ibn al-As fixed the jizyah to be paid by its Libyans tribes at 13,000 dinars. He also demanded from the Nasamones tribe that they should sell to the Arabs a number of their 'sons and daughters' to the value of their share of the total jizyah.

When Amr ibn al-As conquered Tripoli in 643, he forced the Jewish and Christian Libyan to give their wives and children as slaves to the Arab army as part of their jizya.

Uqba ibn Nafi would often enslave for himself (and to sell to others) countless Berber girls, "the likes of which no one in the world had ever seen."

==== Baqt treaty ====
A permanent supply source of African slaves was provided to the Caliphate via the baqt treaty, which was between the Rashidun Caliphate and the Sudanese Christian Kingdom of Dongola in 650, and by which the Christian Kingdom was obliged to provide up to 400 slaves annually to the Caliphate via Egypt.

A successful campaign was undertaken against Nubia during the Caliphate of Umar in 642. The king Kalidurat of Nubia had to submit, and agreed to provide 442 slaves every year to Muslim authorities in Cairo.

Location of Dongola within Sudan

Ten years later in 652, Uthman's governor of Egypt, Abdullah ibn Saad, sent another army to Nubia. This army penetrated deeper into Nubia and laid siege to the Nubian capital of Dongola. The Muslims demolished the cathedral in the center of the city. The battle was once again inconclusive, because of the Nubian archers who let loose a shower of arrows aimed at the eyes of the Muslim warriors. As the Muslims were not able to overpower the Nubians, they accepted the offer of peace from the Nubian king. According to the treaty that was signed, each side agreed not to make any aggressive moves against the other. Each side agreed to afford free passage to the other party through its territories. Nubia agreed to provide 360 slaves to Egypt every year.

=== Commercial slave trade ===
There were also a commercial slave trade to the Caliphate. These were slaves captured or purchased by merchant slave traders and trafficked to the Caliphate, where they were sold.

==== Red Sea slave trade ====
The slave trade from Africa to Arabia via the Red Sea had ancient Pre-Islamic roots, and the commercial slave trade was not interrupted by Islam. While in Pre-Islamic Arabia, Arab war captives were common targets of slavery, importation of slaves from Ethiopia across the Red Sea also took place.

The Red Sea slave trade appears to have been established at least from the 1st-century onward, when enslaved Africans were trafficked across the Red Sea to Arabia and Yemen. The Red Sea slave between Africa and the Arabian Peninsula continued for centuries until its final abolition in the 1960s, when slavery in Saudi Arabia was abolished in 1962.

== Slave market ==
During the Rashidun Caliphate, the Arab elite still lived a partially nomadic lifestyle in the Arabian Peninsula, with base in Mecca and Medina.

The Rashidun Caliphs were known to buy, sell and distribute slaves. On one occasion, Caliph Umar ibn al-Khattab (636–644) sold a substantial number of slaves to two elite Qurashis. Caliph Ali ibn Abi Talib (656–661) were known to manumit slaves on condition that they remain to work on his estates for at least six years afterward.

There was a certain racial hierarchy within the slavery system. Muhammed himself is noted to have bought one non-Black slave for the price of two Black slaves: "A slave came and pledged to the Prophet to emigrate, and the Prophet did not realize that he was a slave. Then his master came looking for him. The Prophet said: 'Sell him to me,' and he bought him for two black slaves. Then he did not accept the pledge from anyone until he asked: 'Is he a slave?"'

=== Female slaves ===
The harem polygyny were expanded during the Islamic conquests, when female prisoners were distributed to the male Muslim warriors in sexual slavery as concubines, particularly after the Islamic conquest of Persia. This had a background in the practice of Muhammed, who himself had four slave concubines. Abu ‘Ubaydah said about Muhammed: "He had four (concubines): Mariyah, who was the mother of his son Ibraaheem; Rayhaanah; another [a third] beautiful slave woman whom he acquired as a prisoner of war; and a slave woman who was given to him by Zaynab bint Jahsh."

Conquests had brought enormous wealth and large numbers of slaves to the Muslim elite. The majority of the slaves were women and children, many of whom had been dependents or harem-members of the defeated Sassanian upper classes. In the wake of the conquests an elite man could potentially own a thousand slaves, and ordinary soldiers could have ten people serving them.

Male Muslims were given the right to have sex with female captives (slaves), which was phrased: "those men who guard their genitals, except with their wives and those whom their right hands possess, for then there is no blame" (Quran 23:6), which granted men the right to have sex not only with their wives but also with female captive slaves.

The Battle of Jalula in 637 ended in a complete Muslim victory, and women and children were enslaved as Spoils of war and Umar says « in fear of Children of these Slave-women who are going to be born, I seek refuge in Allah».

Women captives were known to be subjected to sexual abuse, and the Jewish convert Abdallah ibn Salam were active in mediating between the Jewish Exilarch and the Muslims in ransoming Jewish captives taken during the Islamic conquests, and was obliged to remind the Exilarch that the Torah obligated him to ransom also women who had been raped by the Muslim warriors.

There is a description of Caliph ʿUmar (r. 634–644) himself as a client of a slave dealer: "Nafe’e narrated that whenever Ibn Umar wanted to buy a slave-girl, he would inspect her by analysing her legs and placing his hands between her breasts and on her buttocks” A specific scene was described about Caliph Umar at the slave market: "Mujahid said: ‘I was walking with ibn Umar in a slave market, then we saw some slave dealers gathered around one slave-girl and they were kissing her, when they saw ibn Umar, they stopped and said: ‘Ibn Umar has arrived’. Then ibn Umar came closer to the slave-girl, he touched some parts of her body and then said: ‘Who is the master of this slave-girl, she is just a commodity!’

Slave women where visually identified by their way of dress. Free Muslim women were obliged by religious command to veil for modesty in order to avoid sexual harassment: "O Prophet! say to your wives and your daughters and the women of the believers that they let down upon them their over-garments; this will be more proper, so that they may be recognized [as free Women] and not molested." While Islamic law dictated that a free Muslim woman should veil herself entirely, except for her face and hands, in order to hide her awrah (intimate parts) and avoid sexual harassment, the awrah of slave women where defined differently, and she was only to cover between her navel and her knee. In accordance with this definition, Anas ibn Malik reported that

“The slave women of ʿUmar used to serve us with their heads uncovered, their breasts knocking together and their anklets exposed.”

Reportedly, Umar b. al-Khaṭṭāb himself once saw a slave women wearing a veil, and reacted by attacking her and said: “Remove your veil (ikshifī qināʿik) and do not imitate free women!”

While a Muslim man were given the right to sex with both wives as well as female slaves, Islamic law did not define a difference between his child with a slave (if he had acknowledged paternity) and his child with a legal wife; there was no difference in legitimacy defined between the child of a slave mistress or a wife, and therefore, both were defined as legitimate.

=== Male slaves ===
Eunuchs was a category of male slaves that existed already during the Rashidun Caliphate. The custom of using eunuchs as servants for women inside the Islamic harem had a precedent in the life of Muhammad himself, who used the eunuch Mabur as a servant in the house of his concubine Maria al-Qibtiyya; both of them slaves from Egypt. Eunuchs were, however, relatively rare during the Pre-Abbasid period of Islam, since they were for a long time used exclusively within the harems rather than also outside of them, as was to become the case in the Abbasid Caliphate.

Male slaves sent to the Arabian Peninsula were put to slave labor as agricultural slaves, digging underground irrigation canals and other hard labor, and so many thousands of young men were sent as slaves to Arabia during the Islamic conquests that many Christian and Jewish communities were almost drained of young males.

Slave soldiers were a phenomenon that had occurred in the Mediterranean world already during antiquity, but it was not until Islamic times that this form of slavery came to play any significant role, with an expanding number of slave soldiers.

Slave soldiers are known to have served in the first battle of Muhammad often called mawla-converts, and the African slave soldier Mihja has been referred to as the first Muslim who died in battle. In the Battle of Badr, at least 24 mawla slave soldiers are said to have participated.

During the first two centuries of Islam, the definition of military slavery was somewhat dubious, and the term mawla was used for both slaves as well as former slaves; some soldiers slaves subjected to military slavery; some were slaves who were allowed to enlist as soldiers as Muslims rather than slaves given this role by their master; some were slaves who were given their freedom after having served as soldiers; and some were former slaves. The use of slave soldiers expanded significantly during the following Umayyad Caliphate, but it was not until the Abbasid Caliphate that the institution of ghilman military slavery was truly institutionalized as a clearly defined permanent institution.

== See also ==
- Afro-Arabs
- History of slavery in the Muslim world
- History of concubinage in the Muslim world
- Medieval Arab attitudes to Black people
- Xenophobia and racism in the Middle East
- Racism in the Arab world
- Racism in Muslim communities
- Slavery in the Umayyad Caliphate

== Sources ==
- Boyce, Mary (2001). Zoroastrians: Their Religious Beliefs and Practices. Psychology Press. ISBN 978-0-415-23902-8.
- A. K. S., Lambton (1999). "FĀRS iii. History in the Islamic Period". Encyclopaedia Iranica, Vol. IX, Fasc. 4. pp. 337–341.
- Lecker, Michael (2012). "The Jewish Reaction to the Islamic Conquests". In Kreck, Volkhard; Steinicke, Marion (eds.). Dynamics in the History of Religions Between Asia and Europe: Encounters, Notions, and Comparative Perspectives. Brill. ISBN 9789004225350.
- Lewis, B. (1990). Race and Slavery in the Middle East: An Historical Enquiry. Storbritannien: Oxford University Press.
- Manning, P. (1990). Slavery and African life: occidental, oriental, and African slave trades. Storbritannien: Cambridge University Press.
- Marshak, B.I.; Negmatov, N.N. (1996). "Sogdiana". In B.A. Litvinsky, Zhang Guang-da and R. Shabani Samghabadi (ed.). History of Civilizations of Central Asia, Volume III: The Crossroads of Civilizations: A.D. 250 to 750. UNESCO. ISBN 92-3-103211-9.
- Meri, Josef W.; Bacharach, Jere L. (2006), Medieval Islamic Civilization: L-Z, index, Medieval Islamic Civilization: An Encyclopedia, vol. II (illustrated ed.), Taylor & Francis, p. 878, ISBN 9780415966924
- Morony, M. (1986). "ʿARAB ii. Arab conquest of Iran". Encyclopaedia Iranica, Vol. II, Fasc. 2. pp. 203–210.
- Pipes, Daniel (1981). Slave Soldiers and Islam: The Genesis of a Military System. Yale University Press. ISBN 9780783729909.
- Taef El-Azhari (2019). Queens, Eunuchs and Concubines in Islamic History, 661–1257. Edinburgh University Press. ISBN 9781474423205.
- Zarrinkub, Abd al-Husain (1975). "The Arab conquest of Iran and its aftermath". The Cambridge History of Iran, Volume 4: From the Arab Invasion to the Saljuqs. Cambridge: Cambridge University Press. pp. 1–57. ISBN 978-0-521-20093-6.
