= Fawzia Amin Sido =

Iraqi Yazidi kidnapping victim of ISIS

- Fewziya Emîn Seydo فەوزییە ئەمین سیدۆ
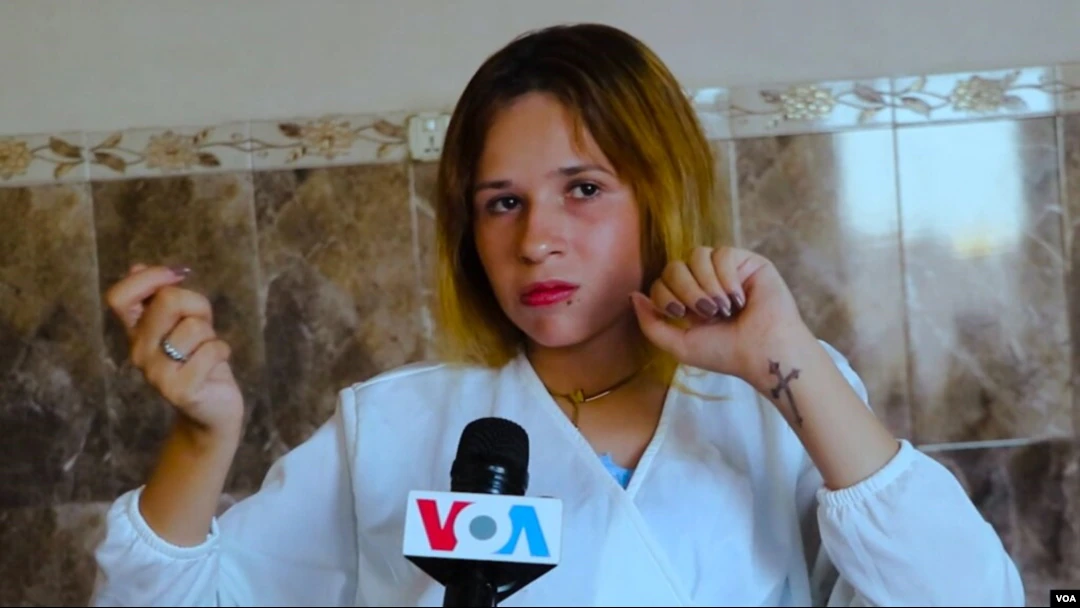
- Other name: Arabic: فوزية أمين سيدو
- Citizenship: Iraq
- Known for: Kidnapping by the Islamic State, trafficking to the Gaza Strip, forced marriage and slavery by Hamas
- Spouse: 2 (both deceased)
- Children: 2 (unknown status)
- Father: Amin Sido
- Family: 2 sisters and 5 brothers

Fawzia Amin Sido (Kurdish: Fewziya Emîn Seydo, فەوزییە ئەمین سیدۆ, (Note: Kurdish language media has spelled her surname several ways: سیدۆ or سەیدۆ or سەیدیۆ) Arabic: فوزية أمين سيدو) is a Kurdish Yazidi woman from northern Iraq. She was captured by the Islamic State as a 10-year-old child, (Note: Gaza's government media office said she was 3 or 4 years older, Washington, State Department spokesman Matthew Miller said she was 11, Voice of America said she was not yet 11.) during the Yazidi genocide in 2014. She was forced into a physically and sexually abusive marriage with a Palestinian militant in Syria, birthing two children before the age of 15. Her husband was killed and she was smuggled to the Gaza Strip in 2020, remaining in captivity by his family and Hamas. During the Gaza war in 2023, an IDF airstrike destroyed the family home, and she fled alone to a shelter further in the Gaza Strip. The IDF said that the airstrike killed her captors. Sido leaving Gaza was complicated by the tensions between Iraq and Israel. However, she was allowed to enter Israel, where American officials escorted her to Jordan, and then reunited with her family in Sinjar, Iraq. Media reports indicate that her rescue was a collaboration between the United States, Israeli, Iraqi, and Jordanian governments.

== Early experiences with captivity ==
Fawzia Amin Sido was abducted by the Islamic State on 3 August 2014, a month before her 11th birthday. It happened on the same day the Islamic State overran Sinjar District. Two of her brothers were also captured, but were released 8 months later. Since her kidnapping, her family had little communication with her.

Fawzia, while still 10 years old, was first given to a man who raped her, recounting that that she was sold five times, to "a Syrian, a Saudi, another Syrian", and then finally to the 24-year-old Palestinian jihadist from Gaza known as "Abu Amar al-Makdisi". By early 2015, Sido was transferred to Raqqa, Syria, where she was forcibly married. She later recounted in an interview that "He told me that I had to sleep with him. On the third day, he went to a pharmacy and brought a drug that numbs part of the body. He gave me the drug and I cried." She faced continuous sexual and physical abuse from her husband, becoming pregnant and giving birth to two children at a young age. The husband became increasingly abusive, particularly after taking a second wife.

Hamas claimed that Abu Amar al-Makdisi was fighting for the Syrian opposition, not the Islamic State. By the end of 2018, after the Syrian Democratic Forces defeated the Islamic State, 15-year-old Sido lost contact with al-Makdisi, who fled to Idlib, which had been captured from the Assad government by Sunni Islamists in 2015. In early 2019, she briefly reunited with him before he was reported dead.

== Travel to the Gaza Strip ==
After the Islamic State militant who bought her was captured by coalition forces and imprisoned in an SDF jail, Sido and her children were taken to the SDF-controlled Al-Hawl refugee camp. From there, the jihadists smuggled them to Idlib province, where they were then taken through a tunnel to Turkey. From there, the Islamic State issued her a fake Jordanian passport, and the family of her Palestinian captor met her and the children in Cairo, where they were smuggled into the Gaza Strip, arriving there around 2020. Once there, she was abused by the family, who saw her as "a kind of domestic slave". She appeared to have been married to one of her old husband's brothers, who was later killed fighting against Israel. Isolated from her family, community, homeland, and language, all while having to care for her children, she was in extreme distress.

On 3 October 2024, the Director General of Yazidi Survivors Affairs, at the Iraqi Ministry of Labor and Social Affairs, stated that "Fawzia was with an ISIS militant from the Gaza Strip, and his mother took her with her to the Strip 4 years ago after her son was killed." US State Department spokesman Matthew Miller said she was "kidnapped by ISIS in Iraq, sold and forced to marry a Hamas fighter in Gaza, moved to Gaza against her will". The Voice of America interview said that she chose to go to Gaza out of fear that her family would reject her and her children.

== Living in the Gaza Strip ==
=== Relationship with the family in Gaza ===
Most sources said Sido was 21 when she left the Gaza Strip, but the media office in Gaza claimed she was 25. Rudaw TV's Arabic service reported that, after moving to the Gaza Strip, Sido married the younger brother of the Palestinian militant who had died in Syria. The Israel Defense Forces claimed that Sido had been held captive by a "Hamas terrorist affiliated with ISIS". Fox News claimed she was "forced to marry an alleged Hamas fighter" after arriving in Gaza.

She stated that Hamas treated her as a slave, and that after the October 7 attacks, Hamas had sent her to work as a slave in a hospital. She and other young women resided at the Shuhada al-Aqsa Hospital in Deir el-Balah, patrolled by armed Hamas fighters. She claimed that "all hospitals were used as Hamas bases. They all had weapons. There were weapons everywhere."

=== Suicide attempts and detention ===
In an interview with The Jerusalem Post, Fawzia stated that she attempted suicide many times because of the severe abuse from both her husband's family and Hamas authorities. She was forcefully hospitalized for a month.

=== Interrogation by authorities in Gaza ===
CNN reported Fawzia as saying, "Hamas constantly harassed me due to my Yazidi background and contact with my family, even going so far as to format my phone during their investigations. After a year, they moved me to a guest house."

=== Reasons for leaving ===
In a conversation with The Jerusalem Post, Sido expressed the gravity of her circumstances, "My situation is very bad. The situation here is grave in many ways. I need to find a way to get out of here as fast as possible. I want to get back to my family". Despite feeling marginally safer in her current location, she conveyed her despair, questioning the purpose of sharing her story, stating, "Is there any benefit in me talking to you about my life, or is it just tiring me out? Because many have asked me and I told them everything, but unfortunately to no avail". Furthermore, she added “I am exhausted here in Gaza. Every now and then Hamas would take me and my phone and torture me,” stating that presently where she was located at the time of the interview, Hamas barely operates and does not control the area, making her feel safer and freer.

Hamas claimed she left voluntarily. Gaza's government media office released a statement on 4 October 2024 that denied the Israeli version of events.

BBC Arabic quoted a long statement from Gaza's government press office in which Hamas denied most elements of the IDF story. They said that she was 25 years old and she had not been a captive. Despite her constantly mentioning the abuse she faced, Hamas claimed she willingly lived in Gaza and only wanted to leave because of the war, and that the IDF "promoted a false narrative and a fabricated story about the Yazidi girl who was in the Gaza Strip and narrated fabricated events that have no truth or basis."

=== Contact with the media ===
Sido posted a TikTok video detailing her plight, which received attention from Rudaw News, a Kurdish media outlet in Iraq, who subsequently assisted in locating her estranged family in Iraqi Kurdistan.

Fawzia was first interviewed by Rudaw News in August 2023, before the war. Fawzia was interviewed by presenter Nasser Ali, with her face almost completely covered by a dark Niqāb. Other Iraqi media interviewed her father, Amin Sido, and said he was critical of Rudaw's coverage.

Some Kurdish media reported that she converted to Islam in Syria.

She also spoke to Israeli media before leaving the Gaza Strip, using the name "Lucia" (Hebrew: לוסיה).

=== Airstrike ===
The Jerusalem Post said that in Gaza she was living with her two young children "at the home of her former husband’s family".

Steve Maman, a Canadian Jewish businessman and head of The Liberation of Christian and Yazidi Children of Iraq, known for his efforts to rescue Yazidis, told The Jerusalem Post in September 2024 that Fawzia Amin Sido escaped her captors in late 2023 after her captor, a "Hamas fighter", was killed in an Israeli airstrike.

The statement from the government in Gaza confirmed that her second husband, the younger brother of her children's father, had been killed in an Israeli airstrike, but kept denying the rest of the events. She did not mention a second marriage when she spoke to Rudaw Media Network in August 2023.

=== Children ===
Major news reports published when Fawzia left the Gaza Strip did not mention what happened to her children or whether they survived the airstrike on the family's house. Despite the length of the Hamas statement published by BBC Arabic, it did not mention the children's whereabouts or situation.

== Rescue operation ==
There were multiple countries involved in her rescue or evacuation from the Gaza Strip. Several countries and organizations released conflicting reports about the nature of their roles. The Israeli military (and sympathetic sources) said she was being held captive by a militant in Gaza and the Israeli military had rescued her. Gaza's government media office released a statement on 4 October 2024 that contradicted most elements of the Israeli version of events, they said she has chosen to leave because of the war. The Iraqi foreign ministry praised groups from Iraq, Jordan, and the United States for Fawzia's safe return home, but did not mention Israeli involvement.

The rescue process was prolonged and repeatedly postponed due to the tensions between Iraq and Israel. On 3 October 2024, reports confirmed Sido's release from Gaza. Israeli intelligence said that they had uncovered her situation, and had engaged with U.S. authorities for further assistance. An IDF report indicated that the operation involved coordination between the IDF's COGAT, the US Embassy in Jerusalem, and other members of the international community. Sido was eventually allowed to enter Israel through the Kerem Shalom border crossing, where she received essential food and medical care, before being escorted by US officials to Jordan via the Allenby Bridge. Saydo arrived in Baghdad on the morning of October 2, and was escorted by Iraqi intelligence officers to Mosul, where she reunited with her mother and the rest of her surviving family.

== Reactions to her return home ==
Fawzia's return to her parents and siblings was announced separately by Israel and Iraq. After she left the Gaza Strip, Brig. Gen. Elad Goren, who oversees Israeli humanitarian efforts in Gaza, remarked that Sido appeared to be physically well but was "not in a good mental situation" after years of daily abuse. A similar report was provided by Silwan Sinjari, an Iraqi Foreign Ministry official.

== See also ==
- Yazidi genocide
- Nadia Murad
- List of Yazidi people
- Human rights in Islamic State-controlled territory
- Women in the Gaza war
- Slavery in 21st-century jihadism
- Slavery in Palestine (before Mandatory Palestine)
- Women in Iraq, Women in Palestine
- List of kidnappings
