= Human trafficking in Israel =

Human trafficking in Israel includes the trafficking of men and women into the country for forced labor and sex slavery. After having been rated by the US State Department and NGOs as one of the worst countries for human and sex trafficking in the world in the early 2000s - with the US even threatening sanctions in 2001 - the country has made serious efforts to reduce the problem in recent years, including the Israeli Supreme Court's abolition of the Israeli version of the kafala system in 2006. It now ranks 90th out of 167 countries in human trafficking. Identification of victims, criminal justice work and efforts to co-ordinate with business and government agencies has been concerted in reducing this problem in the last decade.

Palestinians and foreign workers, primarily from South and Southeast Asia, Eastern Europe, and the Former Soviet Union, migrate to Israel for temporary work in construction, agriculture, and caregiving; traffickers exploit some of these workers in forced labor, such as unlawful holding of passports, restrictions on movement, non-payment of wages, threats, and physical intimidation. It is not known if labour recruitment agencies in source countries and in Israel require workers to pay recruitment fees- a practice that makes workers highly vulnerable to trafficking. Israel had been a destination country for women trafficked from Ghana, Russia, Ukraine, Moldova, Uzbekistan, Belarus, China, South Korea and perhaps the Philippines for the purpose of sexual exploitation. In 2008, NGO had noted an increase in the internal trafficking of Israeli women for commercial sexual exploitation, and reported new instances of trafficking of Israeli women abroad to Canada, Ireland, and England. African asylum seekers entering Israel illegally were also vulnerable to trafficking for forced labour or prostitution. Large numbers of Eritreans had been trafficked into Israel.

In 2007, the government increased the number of convictions for sex trafficking offences, and conducted a campaign to prevent forced labour. Israel also continues to provide victims of sex trafficking with shelter, legal aid and protection assistance. NGOs claimed, "the shelters are insufficient to treat the scale of trafficking victims who were not officially identified in Israel, particularly among migrants and asylum seekers arriving from the Sinai." In 2012 it was reported, "the number of women affected continues to decline since the passage and implementation of Israel's 2006 anti-trafficking law."

The construction of the 245 mile Egypt–Israel barrier in 2013, is credited with further reducing human trafficking into Israel, by preventing irregular migration along the Sinai-Negev trafficking route.

U.S. State Department's Office to Monitor and Combat Trafficking in Persons placed the country in "Tier 1" in 2017, a remarkable improvement from 2001, when Israel had ranked in Tier 3 and the US government had threatened sanctions over the government's tolerance for sex trafficking. However, it was downgraded to Tier 2 in 2021, meaning "countries whose governments do not fully comply with all of TVPA’s minimum standards, but are making significant efforts to bring themselves into compliance with those standards." The State Department reported: "For the fifth consecutive year, the Police Anti-Trafficking Coordinating Unit (PTC), which remained the only authority to officially recognize victims of trafficking, remained severely understaffed, which further impacted the efficiency of victim identification procedures and referral of victims to protection services. Therefore Israel was downgraded to Tier 2." The State of Israel ratified the Protocol to Prevent, Suppress and Punish Trafficking in Persons, especially Women and Children on 23 July 2008.

== Prosecution ==
The Government of Israel has made progress in prosecuting and punishing trafficking offences. Israel prohibits all forms of trafficking in persons through its Anti-Trafficking Law that came into force 29 October 2006, which prescribes penalties of up to 16 years' imprisonment for sex trafficking of an adult, up to 20 years' imprisonment for sex trafficking of a minor, up to 16 years' imprisonment for slavery, and up to 7 years' imprisonment for forced labour. These penalties are commensurate with those for other grave crimes, such as rape. In 2007, the government convicted 38 individuals for sex trafficking—four more than in 2006—with sentences ranging from six months to 15 years' imprisonment and fines.

In addition, 16 prosecutions for sex trafficking were in process as of 2008, and another 15 cases were pending appeal. Israel made some efforts to investigate and punish acts of involuntary servitude; in 2007, the government prepared three indictments for forced labor and one indictment for slavery. In addition, three criminal cases of fraud/deceit of foreign workers involving five defendants were pending prosecution or appeal as of 2008. Israel reported no prosecutions, convictions, or punishments of government officials complicit in trafficking in 2007.

In February 2013 the newspaper Haaretz successfully sued the Tel Aviv District Court to reveal the name of a major sex trafficker who became a police informer, David Digmi.

== Protection ==
The Government of Israel has improved its protection of trafficking victims, but evidence regarding the protection of victims of forced labor remains limited. The government operates a shelter largely for victims of sex trafficking with the support of a local NGO. Notably, though Israel lacks a specific shelter for victims of labor trafficking, government authorities sometimes refer victims of forced labor to the shelter for sex trafficking. Victims in this shelter receive medical treatment, psychiatric and social services, stipends, and temporary residency and work permits.

The government mandates legal aid to all trafficking victims and employs formal procedures to identify victims of sex trafficking and refer them to a shelter. Foreign workers who file complaints regarding criminal offenses are not arrested, are generally placed in alternative employment, and are granted immigration relief. Victims of trafficking receive legal alternatives to their removal to countries in which they may face hardship or retribution, including the issuance of temporary visa extensions.

The government encourages victims of sex trafficking to assist in investigations against their traffickers, but it does not actively encourage victims of forced labor to do the same. Victims not housed in the government shelter, including victims of internal trafficking, do not receive the same level of protection services from the government as victims located in shelters.

== Prevention ==
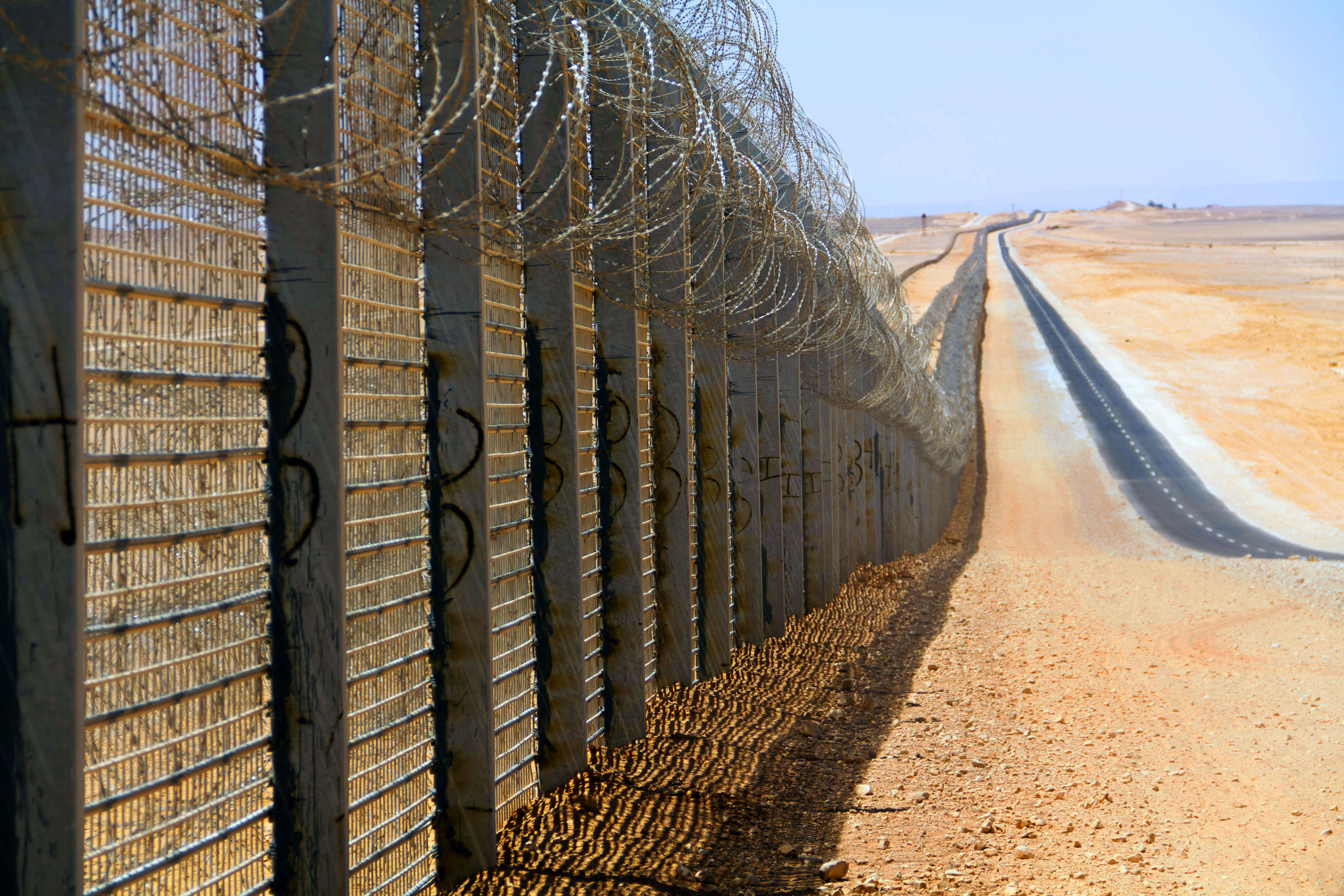
The 245 mile long Egypt–Israel barrier, completed in 2013, obstructs an overland trafficking route into Israel.

Israel has made efforts to prevent trafficking in persons. The Immigration Police has run a radio campaign warning employers not to exploit migrant workers. The Ministry of Education and the Authority for the Advancement of the Status of Women has also conducted awareness campaigns in the school system that included seminars for administrators and teachers on sex trafficking. This program focused on the role of the school system in reducing demand for commercial sexual services.

The 2011 documentary film The Price of Sex (priceofsex.org) was screened at the Jerusalem Cinematheque on 8 March 2013.

== See also ==
- Human trafficking in Palestine
- Egypt–Israel barrier
- Ben Gurion International Airport
- Human trafficking in Egypt
- Sex trafficking in Moldova
