= Zehava (trans woman) =

Palestinian transgender woman

Zehava (10 May 1999 – 11 October 2021) was a Palestinian transgender woman from Beit Lid in the West Bank and a victim of sex trafficking. At the age of 19, she fled the West Bank for Israel because she feared persecution related to her gender identity.

While in Israel, Zehava repeatedly faced arrest and detention because she did not have authorization to remain in the country. Although she was eventually granted a temporary stay permit, Israeli authorities did not formally recognize her as a trafficking victim or give her permission to work legally. Her treatment was subsequently discussed in the United States Department of State's 2022 Trafficking in Persons Report, and the report's use of her case led to a diplomatic dispute between the United States and Israel.

== Early life and trafficking ==
Zehava was born in Beit Lid, a Palestinian village in the West Bank. According to a 2024 profile in Haaretz, an uncle attempted to murder her, and she became homeless at a young age and was trafficked for sexual exploitation.

New Lines Magazine reported that Palestinian Authority police beat and arrested Zehava several times because of the way she expressed her LGBTQ identity. It also reported that several of her uncles had threatened to kill her.

The United States Department of State described Zehava as a sex-trafficking victim who had been blackmailed and threatened when she attempted to leave her traffickers. According to the report, she fled to Israel at the age of 19 because she feared persecution as a member of the LGBTQI+ community.

== Life in Israel ==
According to the State Department report, Zehava asked Israeli authorities to recognize her as a trafficking victim after she entered Israel. The report stated that authorities instead arrested, indicted and deported her because of her immigration status.

Approximately one year later, Zehava returned to Israel and was arrested again on immigration-related charges. She was detained for three months. With the assistance of an Israeli non-governmental organization, she subsequently received a temporary permit allowing her to remain in Israel.

The temporary permit did not authorize Zehava to work legally. Israeli officials also did not formally recognize her as a trafficking victim, a status that, according to the State Department, would have made her eligible for a work permit, housing, legal assistance and other services. She lived with the possibility of deportation when her temporary permit expired.

A 2021 Haaretz report stated that Zehava was living without health insurance or a work permit and that no existing welfare framework was able to accommodate her at that stage. The newspaper reported that she had received a temporary permit on welfare grounds that was valid until the end of October 2021.

New Lines Magazine reported that, after arriving in the Tel Aviv area without money, Zehava sometimes went hungry and slept on benches near Jaffa Port. The magazine stated that Israeli police arrested and imprisoned her 12 times over a two-year period for being in Israel without a permit. It also reported that Zehava said she had been gang-raped while held in an Israeli prison cell.

== Death ==
On 8 October 2021, Zehava was found hanging and still alive in a public park in Haifa. She was taken to Rambam Health Care Campus in grave condition and died three days later, on 11 October, at the age of 22.

Israeli police believed that Zehava had attempted suicide. The State Department's 2022 report stated that she had died by suicide after spending months in NGO shelters without the right to work legally or earn an independent income.

Later coverage questioned whether the circumstances of her death had been sufficiently examined. In 2024, New Lines Magazine described the circumstances as unclear and reported that Israeli police had not investigated them.

== State Department report and diplomatic dispute ==
The United States Department of State included Zehava's story on page 15 of the introductory section of its 2022 Trafficking in Persons Report. The report identified her as a Palestinian transgender sex-trafficking victim and described her arrests, deportation, detention, temporary permit and unsuccessful attempt to obtain formal recognition as a trafficking victim.

The report presented her experience as an example of the difficulties faced by Palestinian LGBTQI+ people seeking protection in Israel, citing widespread discrimination and a lack of legal-protection frameworks.

Axios reported that the Israeli Foreign Ministry summoned a United States Embassy diplomat to protest the inclusion of the case. According to Axios, Israeli officials argued that elements of the account were inaccurate, that Zehava had been in the process of obtaining asylum, and that the report had violated her privacy. Axios further reported that a State Department official later privately apologized for using the case as an example in the report.

== Work-permit policy ==
The legal and public campaign concerning Palestinian LGBTQ people without legal status continued after Zehava's death. Haaretz reported in 2024 that litigation involving her case continued four months after she died and contributed to a decision to grant work permits to people holding temporary permits while they sought permanent resettlement outside Israel.

In June 2022, the Israeli government informed the High Court of Justice that Palestinians permitted to remain in Israel because of LGBTQ-related persecution or domestic violence would be allowed to work legally. Before the change, holders of such temporary permits could remain in Israel but were generally not permitted to work legally.

The policy change provided employment authorization but did not itself grant permanent residence or refugee status.

== Posthumous coverage ==
Zehava's life was documented in the 2024 short film Her Name Was Zehava, directed by Tamar Baruch and based on footage filmed during Zehava's lifetime. The film presents Zehava speaking about her experiences in the West Bank and Israel.

The film won the David L. Wolper Student Documentary Award at the 2024 IDA Documentary Awards.

== See also ==
- Human trafficking in Israel
- LGBTQ rights in Israel
- LGBTQ rights in Palestine
