= Racism in Palestine =

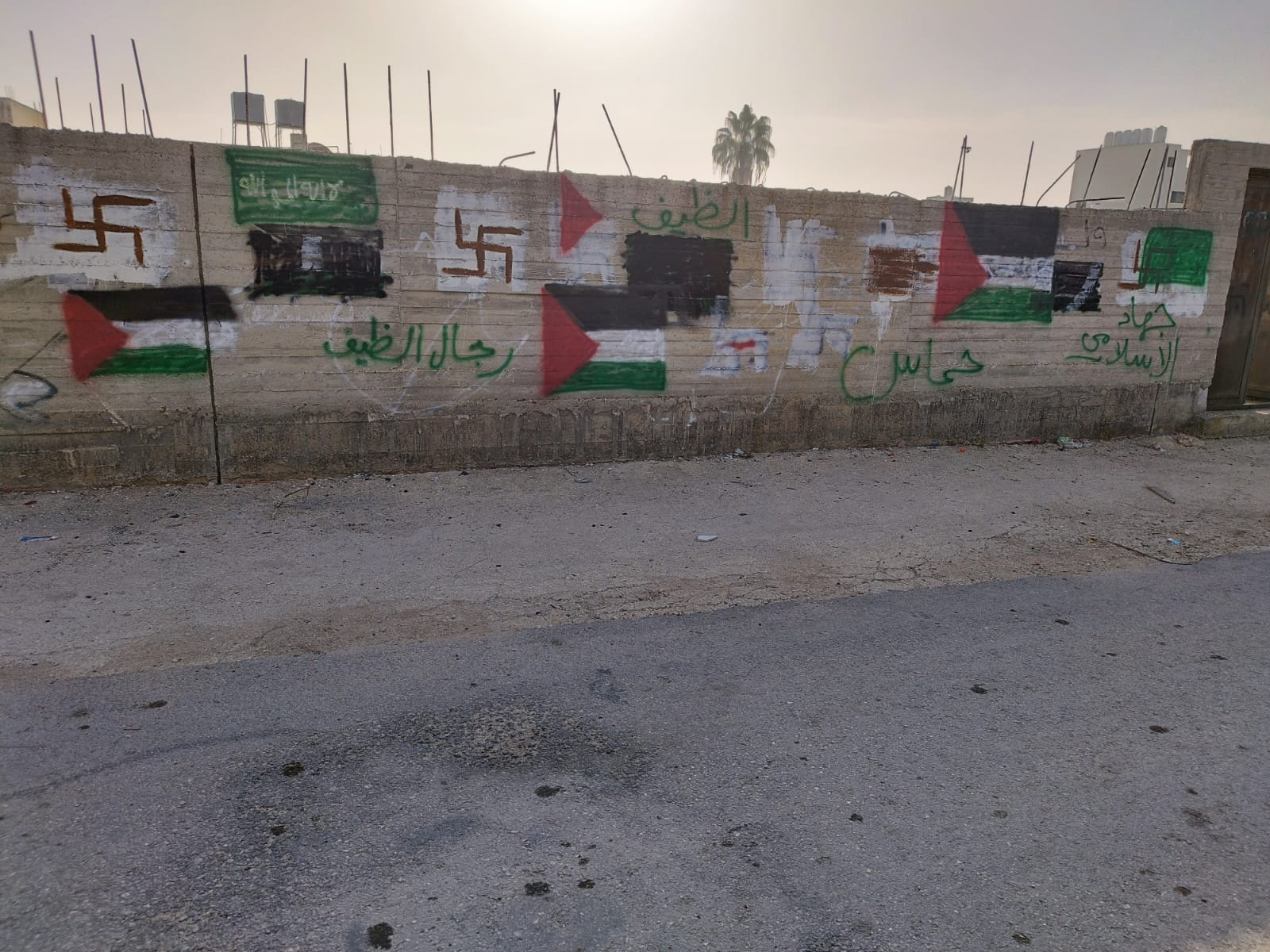
Antisemitic graffiti in Huwara, 2023

Racism in Palestine encompasses all forms and manifestations of racism experienced in Palestine, the West Bank, Gaza, and East Jerusalem, irrespective of the religion, colour, creed, or ethnic origin of the perpetrator and victim, or their citizenship, residency, or visitor status. It may refer to Jewish settler attitudes regarding Palestinians as well as Palestinian attitudes to Jews and the settlement enterprise undertaken in their name.

Accusations of racism and discrimination have been leveled by Palestinians and Israelis against each other. Racism in Palestine may also be used to refer to prejudice directed at Palestinians of African origin, such as the Afro-Palestinian community, some of whom are descendants of slaves in historical Palestine. It has been claimed that racism on the part of Palestinians against Jewish people has been displayed in the realms of educational curriculum, official government policy, state media, social media, institutional policies regarding such issues as land and housing sales, and in statements issued by both the Palestinian Authority governing the majority of the West Bank, and Hamas government in the Gaza Strip.

== Background ==
=== Conflict between Jews and Arabs in British Mandatory Palestine ===
The British Mandate in Palestine witnessed the rise in tensions between Palestinians and the vast majority of Zionists, who were reluctant to recognize Palestinian resistance to Jewish immigration as reflecting legitimate concerns, though some Zionist and Yishuv leaders held that Palestinian opposition reflected a genuine reaction to being "invaded". Resistance to this mass Jewish immigration, who to that date had been numerically unimportant compared to the overwhelmingly Muslim population, arose out of feelings of shock at the proposal by the new British authorities to bestow privileges on an exiguous minority of foreigners. The tensions between an emergent Palestinian nationalism and Zionist ambitions for a Jewish state led on several occasions to riots and violence against Jewish immigrants. Gudrun Kramer argues that Arab positions and actions were "political in character, aiming to defend Arab social, economic, and cultural, and political interests. It was not racial in character, and neither did it reflect racial concepts rooted in Islam.", and that the idea that one can equate anti-Zionism with anti-Judaism and therefore antisemitism "is itself politically motivated, and must be understood as such." The antisemitic forgery The Protocols of the Elders of Zion was at times cited in Palestinian sources after an Arabic translation was issued in Cairo in 1925. After going into exile in 1937 the Mufti of Jerusalem Haj Amin al-Husayni sought support from Nazi Germany and during World War II expressed his opposition to Zionism in antisemitic language. Scholars also disagree on the broader impact of the elements of antisemitism, with Jeffrey Herf arguing that it was influential enough to provide seeds for later Islamist movements, and Krämer and René Wildangel arguing that most Palestinians and Arab nationalists distanced themselves from Nazi ideology. Richard Levy notes that, "Original works of Arabic antisemitic literature did not appear until the second half of the twentieth century, after the establishment of the state of Israel and the defeat of Arab armies in 1948, 1956, and 1967."

1920s–1940s

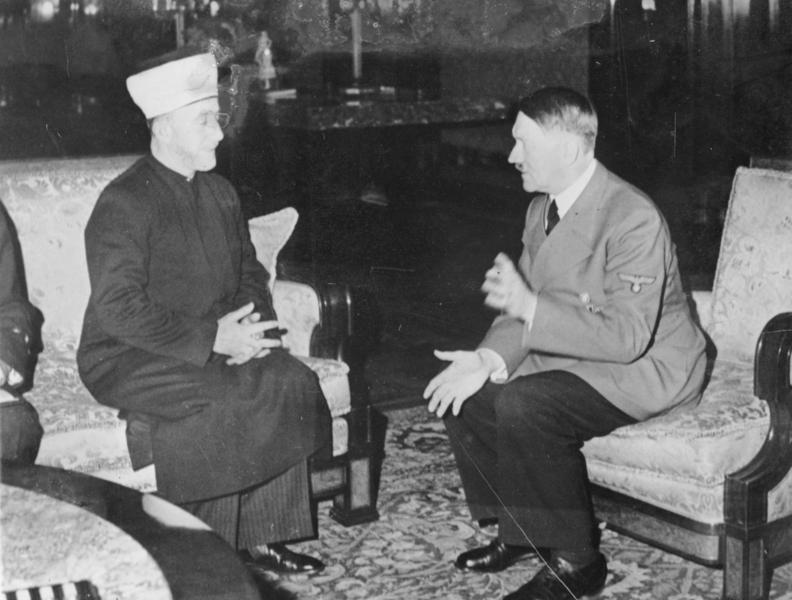
Haj Amin al-Husayni meeting with Adolf Hitler in December 1941

After the British assumed power in the region, Haj Amin al-Husayni was appointed as Mufti of Jerusalem by High Commissioner Herbert Samuel. He was the principal leader of the Arab national movement in Palestine and a popular personality in the Arab world during most of the years of British rule. Two decades later, after the outbreak of WW2, he met with Hitler and other Nazi officials on various occasions and attempted to coordinate Nazi and Arab policies to solve the "Jewish problem" in Palestine.

Zvi Elpeleg, while rehabilitating Haj Amin from other charges, wrote that there is no doubt that the Mufti's hatred was not limited to Zionism, but extended to Jews as such. Amin, according to Elpeleg, knew the fate which awaited Jews, and he was not only delighted that Jews were prevented from emigrating to Palestine, but was very pleased by the Nazis' Final Solution. Benny Morris also argues that the Mufti was deeply antisemitic, since he 'explained the Holocaust as owing to the Jews' sabotage of the German war effort in World War I and [their] character: (...) their selfishness, rooted in their belief that they are the chosen people of God." In contrast, Idith Zertal asserts that 'in more correct proportions, [Husayni appeared] as a fanatic nationalist-religious Palestinian leader'.

In the 1930s, wealthy Arab youths, educated in Germany and having witnessed the rise of fascist paramilitary groups, began returning home with the idea of creating an "Arab Nazi Party". In 1935, Jamal al-Husayni established the Palestine Arab Party, and used the party to create a half-scout, half-paramilitary al-Futuwwa youth corps; briefly designated as the "Nazi Scouts". The organization recruited children and youth, who took the following oath: "Life—my right; independence—my aspiration; Arabism—my country, and there is no room in it for any but Arabs. In this I believe and Allah is my witness." The British expressed concern at the situation in Palestine, stating in a report that "the growing youth and scout movements must be regarded as the most probable factors for the disturbance of the peace."

== Antisemitism in Palestine ==
=== Holocaust denial ===
According to the US Congress report "Contemporary Global Anti-Semitism":

In July 1990, the Palestinian Liberation Organization-affiliated Palestinian Red Crescent published an article in its magazine Balsam claiming that Jews concocted, "The lie concerning the gas chambers." Gradually, throughout the 1990s, Holocaust denial became commonplace in popular media in the Middle East, particularly in the Palestinian Authority.

In August 2003, senior Hamas official Dr Abd Al-Aziz Al-Rantisi wrote in the Hamas newspaper Al-Risala:

It is no longer a secret that the Zionists were behind the Nazis' murder of many Jews, and agreed to it, with the aim of intimidating them and forcing them to immigrate to Palestine.

In August 2009, Hamas refused to allow Palestinian children to learn about the Holocaust, which it called "a lie invented by the Zionists" and referred to Holocaust education as a "war crime."

=== Within the Palestinian leadership ===
==== Hamas ====
Hamas ("Islamic Resistance Movement") is the Palestinian Islamist socio-political organization which won a decisive majority in the Palestinian Parliament in 2006 and currently rules the Gaza Strip.

According to academic Esther Webman, antisemitism is not the main tenet of Hamas ideology, although antisemitic rhetoric is frequent and intense in Hamas leaflets. The leaflets generally do not differentiate between Jews and Zionists. In other Hamas publications and in interviews with its leaders attempts at this differentiation have been made.

The 2017 Hamas charter states, "Hamas affirms that its conflict is with the Zionist project not with the Jews because of their religion." But their 1988 founding charter claimed that the French Revolution, the Russian Revolution, colonialism and both world wars were created as a Jewish Zionist conspiracy and that the Freemasons and Rotary clubs are Zionist fronts and refers to the fraudulent Protocols of the Elders of Zion, an antisemitic text purporting to describe a plan to achieve global domination by the Jewish people.

Hamas legislator and imam, Sheik Yunis Al Astal, said that "suffering by fire is the Jews' destiny in this world and the next". He concluded "Therefore we are sure that the Holocaust is still to come upon the Jews". Another Hamas cleric, Yousif al-Zahar said that "Jews are a people who cannot be trusted. They have been traitors to all agreements. Go back to history. Their fate is their vanishing."

=== In the media and education ===
In its 2009 report on human rights in Palestine, the US State Department asserted that:

Rhetoric by Palestinian terrorist groups included expressions of anti-Semitism, as did sermons by many Muslim religious leaders. Most Palestinian religious leaders rejected the right of Israel to exist. Hamas's al-Aqsa television station carried shows for preschoolers extolling hatred of Jews and suicide bombings.

According to the report, international academics had concluded that "the textbooks did not incite violence against Jews."

In its 2004 report on global antisemitism, the US State Department reported that:

The rhetoric of some Muslim religious leaders at times constituted an incitement to violence or hatred. For example, the television station controlled by the Palestinian Authority broadcast statements by Palestinian political and spiritual leaders that resembled traditional expressions of anti-Semitism.

==== Use of The Protocols of the Elders of Zion ====
The Grand Mufti of Jerusalem Sheikh Ekrima Sa'id Sabri appeared on the Saudi satellite channel Al-Majd on February 20, 2005, commenting on the assassination of the former Lebanese Prime Minister Rafik Hariri. "Anyone who studies The Protocols of the Elders of Zion and specifically the Talmud," he said, "will discover that one of the goals of these Protocols is to cause confusion in the world and to undermine security throughout the world."

=== Official policies by the Palestinian Authority ===
The Palestinian Authority has a prohibition based on a 1973 Jordanian law against selling land to Israelis. The law made such sales, which in the case of Israeli settlers are exclusively to Jews, punishable by death. The Palestinian Authority announced it would enforce the law in 1997, and drafted a replacement for it called the Property Law for Foreigners. The Palestinian Authority describes the law as a response to occupation and illegal settlement.

As of September 2010, the Palestinian Authority has not formally executed anyone under the law, but many land dealers suspected of selling land to Israeli Jews have been extrajudicially killed, in recent decades. In April 2009, a Palestinian Authority military court sentenced an Arab from Hebron to death by hanging for the "crime" of selling land to Jews in the West Bank. At one such case, an arrest by the PA of Arabs who did sell to Jews, the community of Jewish settlers in Hebron sharply protested, declaring: "We call upon the government to accept the racial hatred prevalent in the PA."

The Palestinian Authority and opponents of such land purchases argue that a prohibition of such land purchases is necessary to prevent the illegal expansion of Israeli settlements, and to avoid the prejudicing negotiations on the status of Palestine and further reductions in Palestinians' freedom of movement. Draft PA legislation described the sale of land to "occupiers" as "national treason." There is a broad international consensus, affirmed by a series of UN Security Council resolutions, that Israeli settlements, and the transfer of Israeli nationals into the West Bank and Gaza, constitute violations of international law, specifically the Fourth Geneva Convention. Article 49(6) of that Convention requires that "The Occupying Power shall not deport or transfer parts of its own civilian population into the territory it occupies".

=== Extent of claimed antisemitic attitudes in Palestine ===
According to one poll conduct by the Anti Defamation League, 97% of Palestinians in the West Bank and Gaza held antisemitic views, which would rank as the highest proportion in the world. The Anti-Defamation League's survey methods has been criticized by some who argue that they fail to distinguish "teenage pranks designed to shock."

== Anti-Black racism in Palestine ==
The State of Palestine has a community of Afro-Palestinians, many of whom are descendants of the victims of the historical Slavery in Palestine, which ended in the 20th-century.

=== Racism against African-Americans in Palestinian media ===
Former U.S. Secretary of State Condoleezza Rice, has been the subject of some viciously racial personal attacks, alongside vociferous criticism of her policies. These included an anti-black racist cartoon in Palestinian Authority's controlled Press Al Quds. The New York Times reported in 2006:

Her comment that the Israel-Lebanon war represented the "birth pangs of a new Middle East"—coming at a time when television stations were showing images of dead Lebanese children—sparked ridicule and even racist cartoons. A Palestinian newspaper, Al Quds," which "depicted Ms. Rice as pregnant with an armed monkey, and a caption that read, "Rice speaks about the birth of a new Middle East."

The Palestinian media has used racist terms including "black spinster" and "colored dark skin lady."

== Presence of Israeli settlers and army ==
A review of Israel's country report conducted by the Committee on the Elimination of Racial Discrimination stated "The status of the settlements was clearly inconsistent with Article 3 of the Convention, which, as noted in the Committee's General Recommendation XIX, prohibited all forms of racial segregation in all countries. There is a consensus among publicists that the prohibition of racial discrimination, irrespective of territories, is an imperative norm of international law." In Hebron, the Israeli Army has responded to violence between Israeli settlers and Palestinians by restricting the latter's freedom of movement in the central city. The Israeli human rights organization B'Tselem charges this policy violates the Convention on the Elimination of Racial Discrimination and that:

Underlying the prohibition on Palestinian movement in the City Center is the army’s capitulation to the racist demands of Hebron settlers to enable them to conduct their lives in an environment “free of Arabs,” and the attempt to Judaize the area by separation based on ethnicity.

== See also ==
- Human rights in the Palestinian National Authority
- Slavery in Palestine
- Racism in the Arab world
- Islam and antisemitism
- Racism in Israel
- Israel and apartheid
- Animal stereotypes of Jews in Palestinian discourse
