= Slavery in the Umayyad Caliphate =

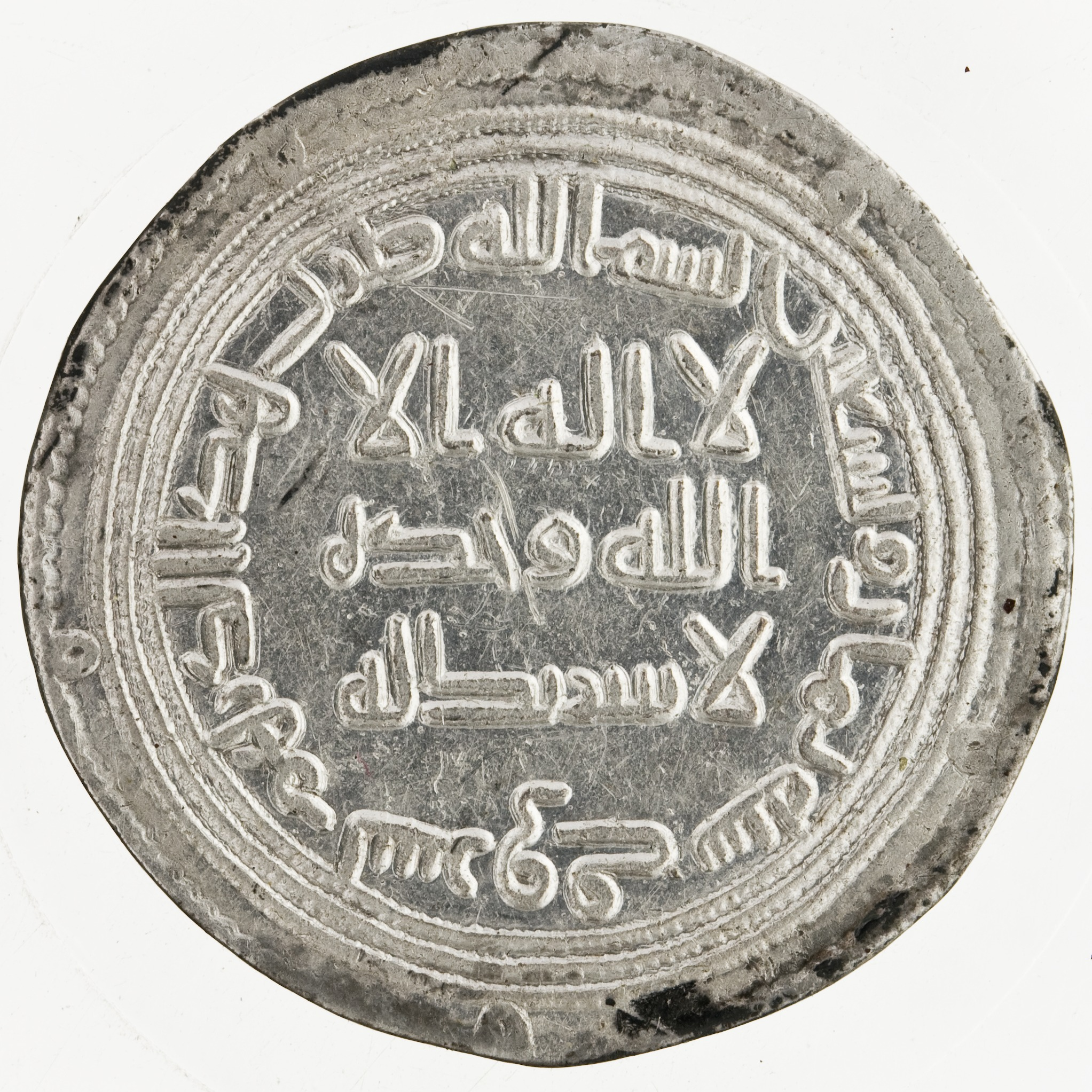
Silver dirham of Sulayman ibn Abd al-Malik obverse

The early Muslim conquests by reign

Caliphate 740-en

Slavery in the Umayyad Caliphate refers to the chattel slavery taking place in the Umayyad Caliphate (661–750), which comprised the majority of the Middle East with a center in the capital of Damascus in Syria.

The slave trade in the Umayyad Caliphate was massive and expanded in parallel with the Umayyad imperial conquests, when non-Muslim war captives as well as civilians were enslaved, and humans were demanded by tribute and taxation from subjugated people. The slave trade was a continuation of the preceding slave trade and slavery in the Rashidun Caliphate except in size, which was paralleled by the massive imperial conquests.

When the governing elite of the Caliphate established a permanent urbanized residence, the institution of slavery expanded in parallel with the growing access as well as the needs of a new urbanised and more sophisticated state apparatus. The system of harem sexual slavery, as well as military slavery of male slaves, expanded during this period, though they would not be fully developed until the succeeding slavery in the Abbasid Caliphate.

== Slave trade ==
The slave trade in the Umayyad Caliphate was built upon the legacy of the slave trade during the preceding Rashidun Caliphate. This was built upon a combination of the enslavement of war captives during the Early Muslim conquests of the Caliphate; tributary and taxation slaves, as well as commercial slave trade by slave merchants.

=== War captives ===
During the Umayyad Caliphate the Imperial Muslim conquests of the preceding Rashidun Caliphate continued. The Empire of the Caliphate expanded to North Africa, Hispania and South France in the West, and the Central Asia and India in the East. The military expansion of the Empire took place in parallel with a slave trade with war captives, which expanded in parallel with the conquests, when captives of subjugated non-Muslim peoples were enslaved. This was defined as legitimate by Islamic law, in which kafir (non-Muslims) of Dar al-harb (non-Muslim lands) were viewed as legitimate targets of enslavement.

==== Armenia ====
During the Arab conquest of Armenia, thousands of Armenians were carried into slavery by the Arab invaders to serve in other regions of the Umayyad Caliphate, including their capital Damascus in the Muslim-controlled Syria.

==== Central Asia ====
During the Muslim conquest of Transoxiana against Queen of Bukhara in Central Asia in the 670s, 80 Turkic war captives were taken by the Umayyad army, who broke their promise to return them and instead deported them to slavery in Arabia, where they rebelled and killed their enslaver, after which they committed suicide.

==== Iberia and France ====
Conquistaislamicapeninsula2

During the Muslim conquest of the Visigoth Kingdom in present-day Spain, Portugal, and South France, the same custom of enslavement occurred as it had during earlier conquests. The Visigoths were Christian and thus viewed as legitimate targets for enslavement in accordance with the principle of kafir of Dar al-Harb.

There were accounts of civilians being captured and abducted for enslavement. Many women and children appear to have been abducted for enslavement during the conquest of the city of Zaragoza in 712.

The customary enslavement appear to have been a normal practice during the conquest, to such a degree that the army of the Umayyad Caliphate included an assurance that all who surrendered would be excluded from enslavement, and local treaties was made to that effect. One such local treaty between Abd al-Aziz and Theodemir, lord of seven towns in the southeast Iberian Peninsula, signed the 5 April 713, included the promise that all who voluntarily submitted to Muslim rule would be exempted from being killed or separated from their family members and enslaved.

The same enslavement took place when Visigoth parts of South France was invaded. During the fall of Narbonne in 720, adult men were slaughtered and the women and children enslaved. After the rebellion of Governor Munuza of Cerdanya in the 730s, his Christian widow Lampegia were sent by the victorious Umayyad commander as a gift to the Caliph in Damascus.

==== India ====
Warfare and tax revenue policies was the cause of enslavement of Indians for the Central Asian slave market, which started during the Umayyad conquest of Sindh of the 8th century, when the armies of the Umayyad commander Muhammad bin Qasim enslaved tens of thousands of Indian civilians and well as soldiers. The slave trade of non-Muslim Indians trafficked to the Islamic world via the Hindu Kush and the slave markets of Central Asia, such as the Bukhara slave trade, started during the Umayyad period, and was to go on for a thousand years. During the Umayyad conquest of Sindh in the 710s, the widow of the defeated Hindu king were, according to the traditional description, taken as a slave by the Umayyad commander, and her daughter Surya Devi were taken as war booty and given as a concubine to the Caliph in Damascus.

==== North Africa ====
Ibn Abd al-Hakam recounts that the Arab General Hassan ibn al-Nu'man would often abduct "young, female Berber slaves of unparalleled beauty, some of which were worth a thousand dinars." Al-Hakam confirms that up to one hundred thousand slaves were captured by Musa ibn Nusayr and his son and nephew during the conquest of North Africa. In Tangier, Musa enslaved all the Berber inhabitants. Musa sacked a fortress near Kairouan and took with him all the children as slaves. The number of Berbers enslaved "amounted to a number never before heard of in any of the countries subject to the rule of Islam" up to that time. As a result, "most of the African cities were depopulated, [and] the fields remained without cultivation." Even so, Musa "never ceased pushing his conquests until he arrived before Tangiers, the citadel of their [Berbers’] country and the mother of their cities, which he also besieged and took, obliging its inhabitants to embrace Islam."

The historian Pascual de Gayangos observed: "Owing to the system of warfare adopted by the Arabs, it is not improbable that the number of captives here specified fell into Musa’s hands. It appears both from Christian and Arabian authorities that populous towns were not infrequently razed to the ground and their inhabitants, amounting to several thousands, led into captivity."

Successive Muslim rulers of North Africa continued to enslave the Berbers en masse. The historian Hugh N. Kennedy observed that "the Islamic jihad looks uncomfortably like a giant slave trade." Arab chronicles record vast numbers of Berber slaves taken, especially in the accounts of Musa ibn Nusayr, who became the governor of Africa in 698, and who "was cruel and ruthless against any tribe that opposed the tenets of the Muslim faith, but generous and lenient to those who converted." Muslim historian Ibn Qutaybah recounts Musa ibn Nusayr waging "battles of extermination" against the Berbers and how he "killed myriads of them, and made a surprising number of prisoners."

According to the historian As-sadfi, the number of slaves taken by Musa ibn Nusayr was greater than in any of the previous Islamic conquests.

Musa went out against the Berbers, and pursued them far into their native deserts, leaving wherever he went traces of his passage, killing numbers of them, taking thousands of prisoners, and carrying on the work of havoc and destruction. When the nations inhabiting the dreary plains of Africa saw what had befallen the Berbers of the coast and of the interior, they hastened to ask for peace and place themselves under the obedience of Musa, whom they solicited to enlist them in the ranks of his army

=== Tributary slaves ===
Slaves were also provided via human tribute and taxation. The conquerors could demand human captives to be given to them in the form of tributes or taxation from defeated people, who were asked to deliver members of their own people to the conquerors for enslavement.

==== Baqt ====
Slaves were also provided via human tribute and taxation. A permanent supply source of African slaves were provided to the Caliphate via the baqt treaty, which had been made between the Rashidun Caliphate and the Sudanese Christian Kingdom of Dongola in 650, and by which the Christian Kingdom was obliged to provide up 400 slaves annually to the Caliphate via Egypt.

==== North Africa ====
In 698, Musa ibn Nusayr was appointed governor of Ifriqiya, as the first governor not under the authority of the governor of the province of Egypt. He was made responsible for completing the conquest of the Maghreb, the Balearic Islands and Sardinia. His troops occupied Tangiers, effectively occupying all of the northern half of modern-day Morocco, and then conquered Sous. In 711, the Umayyad conquest of Spain was launched by Tariq ibn Ziyad from territory in North Africa, establishing full control over the Iberian Peninsula and the province of al-Andalus by 726. During his term as governor of Ifriqiya, Musa ibn Nusayr raided Berber settlements and took captives, who were treated as war booty and taken into slavery in the Umayyad Caliphate. The Umayyad caliph's share of captured Berber slaves amounted to 20,000.

Ismail ibn Abd Allah ibn Abi al-Muhajir was appointed governor of Ifriqiya in 718. He encouraged the Berbers to convert to Islam and curbed the abuses of the Arab military caste. Ismail adhered to Sharia Islamic law and eliminated extraordinary taxes and slave-tributes on Berber populations. He is credited for completing the conversion of the Berber population to Islam. His successor Yazid ibn Abi Muslim, who became governor in 720, re-imposed the jizyah on Berbers and expanded other taxes and tributes. He also tattooed the hands of the Berber guard of Kairouan with their personal names on their right hand and the phrase "Guard of Yazid" on their left hand. He was assassinated in 721.

As a result of dhimmi taxation and slave-tributes, the resentful Berber population started to consider radical Kharijite activists from the East, especially the Sufrites and Ibadites, which began to arrive in the Maghreb since the 720s. The Kharijites preached a strict form of Islam, promising a new political order, where all Muslims would be equal regardless of ethnicity or tribal status.

=== Commercial slave trade ===
There were also a commercial slave trade to the Caliphate. These were slaves captured or purchased by merchant slave traders and trafficked to the Caliphate, where they were sold.

==== Red Sea slave trade ====
The slave trade from Africa to Arabia via the Red Sea had ancient Pre-Islamic roots, and the commercial slave trade was not interrupted by Islam. While in pre-Islamic Arabia, Arab war captives were common targets of slavery, importation of slaves from Ethiopia across the Red Sea also took place.

The Red Sea slave trade appears to have been established at least from the 1st-century onward, when enslaved Africans were trafficked across the Red Sea to Arabia and Yemen. The Red Sea slave between Africa and the Arabian Peninsula continued for centuries until its final abolition in the 1960s, when slavery in Saudi Arabia was abolished in 1962.

== Slave market ==
The expansion of the Islamic Empire during the Umayyad Caliphate included larger areas of urbanised land than the previous conquests. The governing elite of the Caliphate came to establish a permanent residence in an urbanised environment, abandoning the traditional nomad Bedouin lifestyle. The urbanisation of the ruling elite resulted in a more sophisticated court life and state apparatus, which created an expansion of the institution of slavery. However, the slave trade and slavery built on the preceding Rashidun Caliphate and mainly changed by expansion rather than by character.

=== Female slaves ===
Female slaves could be divided in to several categories: jariya or jawari (also called ama and khadima), who were working as domestic servants and could be used sexually by both their enslaver as well as other men; mahziyya, which was a concubine used exclusively for sexual slavery by only her enslaver and could be sold for thousands of dirham; um walad, a concubine who had given birth to a child acknowledged by her enslaver as his, who could no longer be sold and would become free upon the death of her enslaver; and a qina or qiyan, which was a female slave educated as an entertainer in singing, music, poetry, dance and recitation, and became a very expensive category of female slaves.

In the late 7th century the Umayyad dynasty settled in Damascus, where they established a major Palace complex and developed a sophisticated court life and state apparatus in parallel with their permanent urban settlement in a capital. The Caliphate also became a monarchy with an inherited succession. The harem institution of gender segregation and enslaved concubines was not a new institution, but the permanent urban settlement made it possible with a more efficient gender segregation and a larger number of slaves.

Women and girls from defeated non-Muslim peoples were divided as war booty in larger numbers, and subjected to a larger degree of segregation. Certain Umayyad military commanders could receive up to 500 concubines during the Imperial campaigns. Ibn Sa'd estimated that up to a third of the sons of the Umayyad noblemen were the sons of enslaved women.

Slave women where visually identified by their way of dress. While Islamic law dictated that a free Muslim woman should veil herself entirely, except for her face and hands, in order to hide her awrah (intimate parts) and avoid sexual harassment, the awrah of slave women where defined differently, and she was only to cover between her navel and her knee.

==== Qiyan ====
It was during the Umayyad era that the category of female slave entertainers known as qiyan was developed. The presence of female slave entertainers had been an important part of the official representation of a rulers entourage already in Pre-Islamic Arabia. This custom expanded and came to have an increasingly growing role during the Umayyad dynasty, growing in parallel with the increasing seclusion of free Muslim women and royal women during the Umayyad period. In parallel with the growing seclusion of free Muslim women, the importance and popularity of qiyan slave women expanded, since slave women where not subjected to sex segregation but were able to mix with men, and many slave artists became famous during this period, such as Azza al-Mayla.

=== Male slaves ===
While female slaves were more prioritized in the Caliphate than male slaves, the institution of military slavery expanded during the Umayyad Caliphate. The use of eunuchs also expanded in parallel with the expansion of the harem segregation of women.

==== Eunuchs ====
The custom of using eunuchs as servants for women inside the Islamic harem had a preceding example in the life of Muhammad himself, who used the eunuch Mabur as a servant in the house of his concubine Maria al-Qibtiyya; both of them slaves from Egypt. Eunuchs was for a long time used in relatively small numbers, exclusively inside harems, but the use of eunuchs expanded significantly when eunuchs started being used also for other offices within service and administration outside of the harem, a use which expanded gradually during the Umayyad dynasty.

==== Slave laborers ====
Male Zanj slaves from the Swaihili Coast was transported via the Indian Ocean slave trade, as well as African slaves via the Red Sea slave trade, for use as hard laborers in the plantation economy in Souther Iraq. Both the working and living conditions of the Zanj were considered to be extremely miserable. The menial labor they were engaged in was difficult and the slaves appear to have been poorly treated by their masters.

Two attempts to rebel against these circumstances are known to have occurred. A slave rebellion took place in Iraq in 689–690, and a bigger and more serious slave rebellion led by a Black slave named Rabah Shirzanji in 694–695. Both of these revolts had quickly failed and thereafter little is known about their history prior to the great Zanj rebellion of 869.

==== Slave soldiers ====
During the Early Muslim conquests of the 7th- and 8th-centuries, a system of military slavery grew in which non-Muslim men from the conquered peoples such as Berbs and Persians were captured, enslaved, converted to Islam, manumitted and then enlisted in the Caliphate army, a custom which blurred the lines between free recruits and slave soldiers. During the big Imperial conquests of the Umayyad Caliphate, slave soldiers grew to significant numbers in the Caliphal army and played an increasingly important role. The institution of military slavery developed during the Umayyad Caliphate was to become the dominant during the following Abbasid Caliphate.

=== Umayyad harem ===
When the Umayyad dynasty moved from Arabia to their new capital of Damascus, where a great palace complex was being constructed, an advanced royal court system developed. This included an expansion of the harem institution. An additional factor contributing to the expansion of the harem was the fact that the Caliphate essentially became a monarchy, creating a position of heir to the throne.

The Caliphal harem was not yet as fully segregated during the Umayyad era as it would become during the Abbasid era. During the Umayyad Caliphate, it was still possible for the mother and wives of the Caliphs to be given permission to give audiences to male visitors, such as Um al-Banin, the wife of Caliph Al-Walid I (r. 705–715), who is known to have given a famous audience to Governor Al-Hajjaj.

The highest rank of the Umayyad harem was umm albanin ("the mother of sons"). The Umayyad Caliphs married free Muslim women. The sons of free legal wives of the Caliphs where prioritized as heirs to the throne. Aside from the free legal wives, the Caliphal harem came to include a growing number of slave concubines.

The importance of the concubines grew during the Umayyad era. One of the most famous concubines was Hababah, who came to be seen as a bad example because of her influence. Female slaves of Berb ethnicity were particularly popular to be bought for child birth during the Umayyad era, and Caliph Hisham ibn Abd al-Malik (r. 723–743) specifically requested his Governors in North Africa to send him female Berb slaves to became umm-walad, that is to give birth to his children. The child of a slave woman became free if her enslaver chose to acknowledge paternity of the child; however in the Umayyad era such children where not seen as equal to the children of free legal wives since the children where not pure Arabs, and not seen as suitable to inherit the Umayyad throne. The Umayyad Caliphate was a period when the Arab ethnicity was given great importance against the ethnicity of former slaves and converts to Islam.

=== Racial dimension of slavery ===
There was a dimension of racism in the slavery of the Umayyad Caliphate. All non-Muslims not living under Islamic rule were considered a legitimate target of enslavement of Muslims by Islamic law. Because of this, the religious border lands around the Muslim world became centers of sources of slaves, and non-Muslim slaves were trafficked to the Caliphate from Europe in the North, Asia in the East and Africa in the South. Consequently, slaves in the Umayyad Caliphate could have many different races. However, this did not prevent a racist component of slavery. Slaves were valued differently on the market depending on their race, and were considered to have different abilities because of their racial identity, and a racial hierarchy existed among slaves of different races in the Caliphate.

During the Umayyad Caliphate, when the Islamic Caliphate expanded to a truly international empire composed of many different ethnicities, and Islam a universal civilization, with people of different races making the Hajj pilgrimage to Mecca, the Muslim world developed different stereotypical views on different races.

According to Bernard Lewis, contemporary Arab writers often portrayed slavery as a benevolent institution, since slaves came from the non-Islamic world of "idolaters" and "infidels". Through enslavement, they were expected to convert to Islam and thereby gain access to its perceived civilizational benefits.

In the first two centuries of Islam, Muslim were viewed as synonymous to Arab ethnicity, and the non-Arab mawla (converts) freedmen, who were captured, enslaved, converted and manumitted, were considered inferior Muslims and fiscally, politically, socially and military discriminated against also as freedmen.

The hajin half-Arab sons of Muslim Arab men and their slave concubines were viewed differently depending on the ethnicity of their mothers. Abduh Badawi noted that "there was a consensus that the most unfortunate of the hajins and the lowest in social status were those to whom blackness had passed from their mothers", since a son of African mother more visibly recognizable as non-Arab than the son of a white slave mother, and consequently "son of a black woman" was used as an insult, while "son of a white woman" was used as a praise and as boasting.

Racism against Black Africans in the Arab world grew after Islam. While there had been a trade in slaves from Africa to both the Hellenistic world, the Roman Empire and pre-Islamic Arabia, this was in a relatively small scale; but the massive expansion of slave trade from Africa after the Islamic conquests made Africans the most common ethnicity for a slave, and most Africans Arabs interacted with were slaves, which increased racism against Africans.

The low status of Black people were stated in a number of contemporary anecdotes, such as for example in the comment of an Arab who expressed his dislike of a civil war among fellow Arabs referring to an "Ethiopian" (Black African), stating that he "would prefer to be a mutilated Ethiopian slave tending broody goats on a hilltop until death overtakes him, rather than that a single arrow should be shot between the two sides". Abd al-Hamid (d. 750), secretary of the last Umayyad Caliph, wrote to a Governor who had gifted the Caliph with a Black slave: "had you been able to find a smaller number than one, and a worse color than Black you would have sent that as a gift".

While white slaves were often free from any restrictions after manumission, Black slaves were rarely able to rise above the lowest levels in society after manumission, and during the Umayyad Caliphate, Black singers and poets complained about the racist discrimination against Black slaves and freedmen in their work.

During the first century of Islam, Black slaves and freedmen could achieve fame and recognition, but from the Umayyad Caliphate onward, Black freedmen (unlike white), are with rare exceptions no longer noted to have achieved any higher positions of wealth, power, privilege or success, and contemporary Arab Muslim writers contributed this factor to a lack of capacity.

By the 8th century, Blackness was associated with ugliness and inferior status, and this was mentioned by black Arab poets in their writings. Black skin was associated with evil, devilry and damnation, while white skin carried the opposite associations, a racist stereotype described also in the Quran (III: 102).

Arab racist stereotypes against Black Africans portrayed Black people as people with a simple piety, but also with an unbridled sexuality with immense potency, a stereotype described in "The Thousand and One Nights". The stereotypical Black man was described both as a seducer or rapist of white women, but also himself a victim of frustrated white wives and daughters, while the Black woman was ascribed both repulsive ugliness as well as incandescent sexuality by Arab poets.

Turkic men were widely regarded to be brave and suitable for military slavery. Caliph Mutasim had 70.000 Turkic slave soldiers, and one of his governors noted that there were "none like the Turk for service". While Turkic men were considered brave soldiers, Turkic women were seen as ideal for giving birth to brave sons.

== See also ==
- Afro-Arabs
- History of slavery in the Muslim world
- History of concubinage in the Muslim world
- Medieval Arab attitudes to Black people
- Xenophobia and racism in the Middle East
- Racism in the Arab world
- Racism in Muslim communities
- Slavery in al-Andalus

== Sources ==
- Fernández-Morera, Dario (2016). The Myth of the Andalusian Paradise. Wilmington, Delaware: Intercollegiate Studies Institute. ISBN 978-1-5040-3469-2.
- Lewis, Bernard (1990). Race and Slavery in the Middle East: An Historical Enquiry. Oxford University Press. ISBN 978-0-19-505326-5.
- Lewis, Bernard (2002). The Arabs in History. Oxford: Oxford University Press. pp. 112 ff. ISBN 0-19-280310-7.
- McKinney, Robert C. (2004). The Case of Rhyme versus Reason: Ibn al-Rumi and His Poetics in Context. Leiden and Boston: Brill. ISBN 90-04-13010-1.
- Aḥmad ibn Muḥammad Maqqarī; Ibn al-Khaṭīb (1964). Pascual de Gayangos y Arce (ed.). The History of the Mohammedan Dynasties in Spain. Johnson Reprint Corporation.
- Moorthy Kloss, Magdalena (2023). "Slavery in Medieval Arabia". In Damian A. Pargas; Juliane Schiel (eds.). The Palgrave Handbook of Global Slavery throughout History. Palgrave Macmillan. pp. 139–158. ISBN 978-3-031-13259-9.
- Nöldeke, Theodor (1892). Sketches from Eastern History. Translated by Charles John Sutherland Black. London and Edinburgh: Adam and Charles Black.
- Popovic, Alexandre (1999). The Revolt of African Slaves in Iraq, in the 3rd/9th Century. Translated by Léon King. Princeton: Markus Wiener Publishers. ISBN 1-55876-162-4.
