= Human trafficking in Palestine =

Human trafficking in Palestine has been observed and reported by some sources.

== Studies ==
In December 2009, a 26-page report was published by SAWA, from United Nations Development Fund for Women (UNIFEM), which included that there is a lack of data collection on human trafficking in Palestine. The report calls on Palestinian governmental organizations to establish new legislation that should guarantee that females are treated as victims of crime and not offenders.

== Factors ==
Vast poverty and lack of economic scope have been cited as major factors in human trafficking in the Palestinian territories. Other activities includes sex exploitation and child labor.

== See also ==
- Human rights in Palestine (Aswat, Al Mezan, Al Haq)
- Blockade of the Gaza Strip (Israel, Egypt)
- Palestinian freedom of movement (West Bank barrier)
- Women in Palestine (Prostitution)
- Demographic history of Palestine
- Israel Border Police
- Fawzia Amin Sido
