= Hababa, Syria =

Hababa حبابة
- Village
- Location in Syria Hababa (Middle East) Hababa (Asia)
- Coordinates: 34°54′59″N 36°1′39″E
- Country: Syria
- Governorate: Tartus
- District: Duraykish District
- Subdistrict: Hamin Subdistrict

Population (2004)
  - Total: 769
- Time zone: UTC+3 (EET)
  - Summer (DST): UTC+2 (EEST)
- City Qrya Pcode: C5605

Hababa (Arabic: حَبَابَة) is a Syrian village in the Duraykish District in Tartous Governorate. According to the Syria Central Bureau of Statistics (CBS), Hababa had a population of 769 in the 2004 census. In 1960, the village had a population of 245.
