= SAWA (non-profit organization) =

Palestinian civil society non-profit

Sawa Organization
- Formation: 1998
- Type: Non-governmental organization
- Purpose: Women's rights, Children's rights
- Headquarters: Ramallah and Jerusalem
- Region served: Palestine
- Methods: Helpline, Education, Mobile Clinic, Volunteer Program
- Official language: Arabic, English
- Key people: Ohaila Shomar, General Director
- Website: sawa.ps/en

SAWA is a Palestinian, non-profit civil society organization established in 1998 by a group of female volunteers active in women's issues.

This organization works to eliminate all types of violence against women and children, and to promote gender equality in Palestinian society. The vision of SAWA is clearly stated: "Sawa Foundation seeks to be an initiative for a Palestinian society that combats all forms of violence and abuse against women and children, and supports human health, dignity and safety."

SAWA works toward the goals of this vision in several basic ways. Intensively trained volunteers and staff work at the national call center hot line, which is free for callers. Counseling and support is given and if needed, medical and legal guidance as well. People in need of SAWA's services can also contact them through email. In addition to the main call center, SAWA has a mobile clinic which allows them to conduct outreach programs in different parts of the community and outlying areas. SAWA also provides training and technical assistance for law enforcement, school personnel and others in the areas of domestic violence and abuse.

A special hotline for children was established by SAWA and became available for use in 2005. It is called the Palestinian Child Protection Helpline and is part of an international network of child help lines called Child Helpline International.

SAWA also publishes and distributes printed material for the purpose of education and awareness of physical, psychological and sexual violence. These efforts toward outreach resulted in the major role SAWA had/has in assisting victims of the siege of Gaza in 2008–2009.

During the siege of Gaza, an emergency hotline was opened up for traumatized children and parents in Gaza. 200-250 calls per day were coming into SAWA's hotline.

SAWA is also very active in combatting human trafficking and the prostitution of Palestinian girls and women.

SAWA wrote an extensive report regarding this problem, called, "Trafficking and Forced Prostitution of Palestinian Women and Girls: Forms of Modern Day Slavery."

== Sawa's helpline ==
Sawa has several programs combatting Gender Based Violence (GBV). The core program is the helpline which operates in all of the Palestinian Territories. Callers can reach the helpline in various different ways.

== History ==
In August 1998 a group of eight trained volunteers from the Jerusalem Rape Crisis Centre (JRCC) started operating a special helpline for Arab women. The helpline aimed to "provide a comprehensive response to the suffering of loval women subject to the trauma of sexual violence".

In 2004 the need for a Child Protection Helpline was recognized and implemented. The Child Protection Helpline became a member of the Child Helpline International in 2005, and international network of child helplines from 143 countries.

From 2009 to 2011 Sawa went through large technological progress. They added an IP-phone system, which allowed the organization to receive and document more calls. It also allowed the development of an electronic database, the Caller Information Database. The Caller Information Database featured a statistical report function that could be used finding and targeting new problems in society. Sawa won the Arab Gulf Fund for UN Development in 2010 for its technological progress.

== Programs ==
The main focus of Sawa Organization is to combat violence against women and children, as stated on their homepage. Besides, the organization runs various programs to combat other issues in the Palestinian society.

=== Helpline ===
The Helpline is the core of Sawa's work. It operates from 24 hours a day every day of the week. The counsellors are volunteers and go through training. The helpline is toll-free and supported by PalTel. The Helpline offers counselling by phone, chat, e-mail and face-to-face.

=== Educational programs ===
Sawa arranges various workshops which lasts from 1–3 months.
