= The Liberation of Christian and Yazidi Children of Iraq =

Canadian non-profit organization

- Abbreviation: CYCI
- Formation: June 2015
- Founder: Steve Maman
- Purpose: Anti-sex slavery, Combatting human trafficking
- Leader: Steve Maman
- Website: LiberationIraq.com

The Liberation of Christian and Yazidi Children of Iraq or CYCI foundation is a Canadian non-profit organization that aims to free Christian and Yazidi women captured and forced into sex slavery by ISIS.

== History ==
In 2014, Steve Maman connected with negotiators in Baghdad, Iraq, to build a network to rescue Yazidi and Christian women and girls sold into sexual servitude by ISIS. Maman founded the Liberation of Christian and Yazidi Children of Iraq in June 2015. Maman often visited Morocco and Iraq to purchase vintage cars to bring them back for his classic car dealership based in Montreal. During this time, he made contacts that would go on to help build his network of brokers within the ISIS-controlled areas.

In June 2015, Maman founded the CYCI foundation with a team of negotiators in Iraq who would rescue the girls by paying brokers. The foundation started raising funds for their operations through volunteer donations and a GoFundMe account. Maman currently serves as the president of the foundation.

In August 2015, Gill Rosenberg, the first female foreigner to join YPJ forces fighting ISIS, joined the organization as a volunteer.

== Negotiations ==
The CYCI foundation is primarily involved in negotiating with brokers in ISIS controlled territories for the release of captured Yazidi women and girls. The organization releases funds to their members based in Iraq, who pay brokers for releasing the women. The organization first takes the rescued women and girls to internally displaced persons camps in Kurdistan and later makes efforts to re-unite them with their families. CYCI raises funds through donations made on its official website and through crowdfunding portals, including GoFundMe. According to Maman, each rescue costs between $1000 and $3000.

== Criticism ==
Members of the Yazidi community, including the Baba Sheikh Khurto Hajji Ismael, the Yazidi spiritual leader, and those involved in outreach and humanitarian support, have disputed Maman's work and called for greater transparency and oversight in the work with minority populations fleeing Iraq.

== Steve Maman ==
Steve Maman
- Born: March 1, 1973 (age 53); Casablanca, Morocco
- Occupations: Businessman, entrepreneur, founder of the liberation of christian and yazidi children of iraq (cyci)
- Website: http://www.stevemaman.com/

Steve Maman (born March 1, 1973) is a Jewish-Canadian businessman, entrepreneur, social worker, and the founder of the CYCI foundation. Maman was born in Morocco on March 1, 1973, and raised in Montreal, Canada, where he became a vintage car dealer. He is a married father of six.

Maman has often mentioned Oskar Schindler as an inspiration for the organization in his interviews and is often referred to as the "Jewish Schindler" by news portals.
