= Hababah, Yemen =

Hababah حبابة
- Village
- Location in Yemen
- Coordinates: 15.54418°N 43.87563°E
- Country: Yemen
- Governorate: 'Amran
- District: Thula
- Elevation: 8,543 ft (2,604 m)
- Time zone: UTC+3 (Yemen Standard Time)

Hababah (Arabic: حبابة, romanized: Ḥabābah) is a small town and 'uzlah in Thula District of 'Amran Governorate, Yemen. It is located between Thula and Shibam Kawkaban. Its population was 9,496 people, according to the census conducted in 2004.

== Name and history ==
According to the 10th-century writer al-Hamdani, Hababah is named after Ḥabābah ibn Lubākhah, of the tribe of Himyar.
