= Medieval Arab attitudes to Black people =

Attitudes of medieval Arabs to Black (sub-Saharan African) people varied over time and individual attitude. Though the Qur'an expresses no racial prejudice, Bernard Lewis argues that ethnocentric prejudice later developed among Arabs, for a variety of reasons: the declining power of the Aksumite Empire; Arabs' extensive conquests and slave trades; the influence of Aristotelian ideas regarding slavery, which some Muslim philosophers directed towards Zanj; and the influence of Judeo-Christian ideas regarding divisions among humankind. On the other hand, the Afro-Arab author Al-Jahiz, himself having a Zanj grandfather, wrote a book entitled Superiority of the Blacks to the Whites, and explained why the Zanj were black in terms of environmental determinism in the "On the Zanj" chapter of The Essays.

According to Wesleyan University professor Abdelmajid Hannoum, French Orientalists projected racist and colonialist views of the 19th century into their translations of medieval Arabic writings, including those of Ibn Khaldun. This resulted in the translated texts racializing Arabs and Berbers, when no such distinction was made in the originals. James E. Lindsay argues that the concept of an Arab identity itself did not exist until modern times, though others like Robert Hoyland have argued that a common sense of Arab identity already existed by the 9th century.

== Terminology ==
Many medieval Arabic texts categorise people phenotypically into three types of skin-colour: white (al-bīḍān, 'the white ones' associated particularly with Arabs and Berbers), red (associated particularly with Romans, Greeks or Europeans in general), and black (al-sūdān 'the black ones', associated particularly with darker-complexioned Africans).

In pre-Islamic Arabia, Black people were referred to as ḥabashī (related to the term Abyssinian); this word's precise meaning is unclear, but it probably denoted people living under Aksumite rule and particularly people from the Horn of Africa. The East African coastal region corresponding to the littoral of what is currently Kenya and Tanzania was called Zanj and people from there (or imagined to be from there) were called by the same term.

People encountered by Arab traders along the Senegal and Niger rivers were sometimes referred to by the nicknames Lamlam, Damdam or Namnam.

In a number of Arabic dialects, the word ʿabīd ('slaves') has come to denote West, Central and East Africans.

== Pre- and early Islamic period ==
Pre-Islamic Arab relations outside of North Africa focused on the Aksumite Empire, which exerted considerable power and sometimes direct rule in the Arabian Peninsula from as early as the second century BCE to around the Year of the Elephant (sometime in the 550s to 570s), when, at least according to Islamic tradition, increasingly united Arabs defeated Aksumite armies which ruled southern Arabia. During the pre-Islamic period, significant numbers of black people were present in the Arabian Peninsula, and the image of the Abyssinian and African as a warrior is thought to have been significant in the Arab imaginary, both because of the power and presence of Aksumite forces and Arabs' own employment of African mercenaries. The work of seven poets who can be identified as Black composed in Arabic in the pre-Islamic period is thought to have survived; these poets include ʿAntarah ibn Shaddād al-Absī (d. 608), Khafāf ibn Nudba al-Sulakhī, and Sulayk bin al-Sulaka, all born to ethnic Arab fathers and enslaved Black mothers (respectively Hassad, Mufuta, and Mutunda) and known as 'the crows of the Arabs'. This poetry attests to the abuse these poets received for their Black skin, kinky hair, culture and/or parentage, yet also to the social success of these Black people.

The Qurʾān itself views diversity of human skin colour as part of divine providence and welcomes all humans to Islām. For example, sūra 30 verses 20–22 read "One of His signs is that He created you from dust and—lo and behold!—you became human and scattered far and wide [...] Another of His signs is the creation of the heavens and earth, and the diversity of your languages and colours". One of Muḥammad's closest companions was the emancipated slave Bilāl ibn Rabāḥ, who is reputed to have been Black,while ḥadīth attributed to Aksum a supportive role for early Muslims, which later encouraged a body of pro-Ethiopian Muslim literature. At the same time, Arabic poetry from the early Islamic period continues to attest to abusing people for their dark skin colour, kinky hair and culture.

One important echo of these pre- and early ideological relationships between the Arab and African worlds is found in the writings of al-Jāḥiẓ (d. 868/869), whose Fakhr al-Sūdān wa-al-Bīḍān ('pride of Blacks over Whites') represents debate about the superiority of these cultures.

== Islamic Middle Ages ==
=== Black slaves in the Arab world ===
As Aksumite power declined and military challenges to Arabs' power came increasingly from the Roman Empire and Persia, Arab political relationships with sub-Saharan Africa shifted. Relations with Aksum focused not on war but on trading, particularly as part of the Indian Ocean slave trade. Arab influence on the African coast near the Horn of Africa led to a number of African polities becoming Muslim, such as the Sultanate of Dawaro, Fatagar, Hadiya Sultanate and Bale; this region was referred to around 1400 by the geographer Al-Maqrīzī as al-ṭirāz al-islamī ("the Muslim Fringe"). Once Arab armies had conquered Egypt in 639-41, they also neighboured the Nubian, Christian kingdom of Dongola, which would remain independent into the thirteenth century, and also had ready access to Greek geographical scholarship, which would remain profoundly influential in Arab conceptions of Africa throughout the Middle Ages.

In the periods following the end of the Rashidun Caliphate, the Muslim identity was viewed as synonymous to Arab ethnicity, especially by much of the Umayyad elite, and the non-Arab mawla (converts) freedmen, who were captured, enslaved, converted and manumitted, were considered inferior Muslims and fiscally, politically, socially and military discriminated against also as freedmen. The hajin, half-Arab sons of Muslim Arab men and their slave concubines, were viewed differently depending on the ethnicity of their mothers. Abduh Badawi noted that "there was a consensus that the most unfortunate of the hajins and the lowest in social status were those to whom blackness had passed from their mothers", since a son of African mother more visibly recognizable as non-Arab than the son of a white slave mother, and consequently "son of a black [slave] woman" was used as an insult, while "son of a white [slave] woman" was used as a praise and as boasting.

By the ninth century, with North Africa now part of the Caliphate, contact with West Africa was also underway via coastal routes. These encounters likewise provided hubs for human trafficking. According to Helmi Sharawi, "these economic activities were the foundation of Arab production modes for ten centuries and gave rise to the image of 'Master Arab merchant' who dominated the Abyssinian or Negro slave". (Though within this overall prejudiced climate, the status of Black Muslims (who were among the Muslims known as mawālī) was superior to that of non-Muslim Africans associated with more westerly parts of the continent.)

Thus, although Black people did not make up a majority of slaves in the Arab world during the medieval period, dark-skinned Africans in the Arabian Peninsula and elsewhere in Caliphate tended to be slaves. For example, al-Ṭabarī estimated that in Southern Basra alone there were around 15,000 around the 870s.

The low status of Black people were stated in a number of contemporary anecdotes in the Umayyad Caliphate, such as for example in the comment of an Arab who expressed his dislike of a civil war among fellow Arabs referring to an "Ethiopian" (sub-Saharan African), stating that he "would prefer to be a mutilated Ethiopian slave tending broody goats on a hilltop until death overtakes him, rather than that a single arrow should be shot between the two sides". Abd al-Hamid (d. 750), secretary of the last Umayyad Caliph, wrote to a Governor who had gifted the Caliph with a Black slave: "had you been able to find a smaller number than one, and a worse color than Black you would have sent that as a gift".

While white slaves were often free from any restrictions after manumission, Black slaves were rarely able to rise above the lowest levels in society after manumission, and during the Umayyad Caliphate, Black singers and poets complained about the ethnocentrism against Black slaves and freedmen in their work.

Notable Islamic caliphs with Sub-Saharan ancestry include Abu al-Misk Kafur Al-Mustansir Billah, Yaqub al-Mansur, Abu al-Hasan Ali ibn Othman, Sultan of the Marinid dynasty and Moulay Ismail Ibn Sharif.

=== Stereotypes about Black people ===
The situation where most Black people living among Arabic-speakers were enslaved encouraged Arabs to view themselves as superior to Black people. Michael A. Gomez has noted that the racial diversity of slaves in the Arab world indicates "just how unnecessary it was for Muslims to justify slavery" through ideologies of race—slaves simply had to be non-believers—and that "a panoply of considerations" informed Arab views of Africans,

including religious practice, markers of "civilization", phenotype, and slavery's expansion. The first two filters are paramount, involving the presence or absence of Islam (or another Ibrahimic religion), followed by urbanity, literacy, wealth accumulation, and clothing. Some observers were aware that West and North African societies were heterogeneous, that categories of "black" and “white” were simplistic, and were therefore more interested in other distinctions.

Nevertheless, "the growth of the trans-Saharan slave trade homogenized and narrowed these perspectives, with those deemed 'Sudan' increasingly associated with the servile estate", and stereotypes about Black people increasingly came to be used as an ideological mechanism for Arabs to justify their enslavement.

As medieval Arabs gained access to Ancient Greek scholarship, they also became influenced by its stereotypes of Africans. At the same time, like medieval Jews and Christians, Muslims harnessed the biblical myth of the Curse of Ham to claim that humans naturally had white skin, but that Ham and his descendants had been made black by a divine curse. The position of Aksum as a threat to pre- and early-Islamic Arabian power also continued to be invoked in anti-Black rhetoric.

For example, Ibn Buṭlān composed a stereotyping description of the qualities of slaves of different races which is relatively positive about Nubians, but otherwise particularly negative about the characteristics of Black people. Another example comes from al-Mutanabbī (d. 965):

The slave is no brother to the godly freeman. Even though he be born in the clothes of the free. Do not buy a slave without buying a stick with him, for slaves are filthy and scant of good. I never thought I should live to see the day when a dog would do me evil and be praised in the bargain, nor did I imagin that true men would have ceased to exist, and that the like of the father of bounty, would still be here, and that negro with his pierced camel’s lip would be obeyed by those cowardly hirelings. Who ever taught the eunuch negro nobility? His “white” people, or his royal ancestors? or his ear bleeding in the hand of the slave-broker? Or his worth, seeing that for two farthings he would be rejected? wretched Kafur is the most deserving of the base to be excused in regard to every baseness and sometimes excusing is a reproach and that is because white stallions are incapable of gentility, so how about black eunuchs?

Abuse of phenotypical features associated with Black African people is found even in the poems which al-Mutanabbī composed in both praise and criticism of the Black vizier of Egypt Abū al-Misk Kāfur (d. 968), which variously seek either to excuse or to lambast Kāfur for his colour and heritage.

By the 8th-century, Blackness was associated with ugliness and inferior status, and this was mentioned by black Arab poets in their writings. Black skin was associated with evil, devilry and damnation, while white skin carried the opposite associations. Writing in 1337, Ibn Khaldun stated in the Muqaddimah that "the Negro nations are, as a rule, submissive to slavery, because (Negroes) have little that is (essentially) human and possess attributes that are quite similar to those of dumb animals, as we have stated."

The negative characteristics imputed to Black people included the idea that black men were sexually voracious; thus the most recurrent stereotype of black people in the Thousand and One Nights is the black male slave fornicating with a white woman, while the Egyptian historian al-Abshibi (d. 1446) wrote that "[i]t is said that when the [black] slave is sated, he fornicates, when he is hungry, he steals."

Mass revolts of slaves against the institution of slavery in the Abbasid Caliphate were particularly associated with Black slaves by contemporary writers; the most prominent is the so-called Zanj Rebellion of 869-883. The precise composition (and degrees of freedom) of the rebels is uncertain, however; in the assessment of Helmi Sharawi, the association of Black people with rebellion in medieval Arabic sources partly reflects prejudice towards Black people, and he argues that the rebellions were not to do with race as such "but were a part of the whole context of resisting inequality and oppression in the four corners of the Arab-Islamic world". Allegedly, such was his distrust of Black people, Abu Muslim al-Khurasani massacred four thousand of his own Black soldiers after completing the Abbasid Revolution.

About fifteen of the many medieval Arabic travel-writers discuss West and East Africa, most famously Ibn Baṭṭūṭa, potentially representing opportunities for more diverse encounters with and nuanced attitudes to Black people than encounters with slaves in the rest of the Arab world would have produced; but their accounts remain highly stereotyped. According to Helmi Sharawi, 'when the traveller deals with the subjective aspect of Black character, he remembers but the sexual dissipation, women’s stripped apparel and their deep involvement in superstition'. Likewise, in ethnographers' categorisations of nations in this period, Black people are consistently represented as the basest (and Arabs as the finest); for example, al-Tawḥīdī (d. 1023) described Black people as 'errant beasts'.

More positive discussions of Black people, such as those of al-Jāḥiẓ, al-Bayhaqī (in his Virtues and Vices; d. 1066) and al-Suyūṭī (in his Promenade in Preference among Whites, Blacks and Coloured; d. 1505), or admiring portrayals of the visit of Mansa Musa to Cairo and Mecca, do exist. But they tend to position their virtues as being in spite of their blackness, whether discussing Black people as individuals or as a nation. Al-Idrisi's thirteenth-century description of Africa is especially positive, while the Muqaddima of the fourteenth-century Ibn Khaldūn is particularly noted for dismissing the idea of the Curse of Ham and explaining skin-colour as produced by environmental conditions.
